= List of Lepidoptera of North Macedonia =

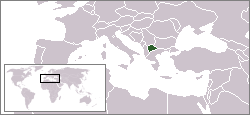
Location of North Macedonia

The Lepidoptera of North Macedonia consist of both the butterflies and moths recorded from North Macedonia.

== Butterflies ==
=== Hesperiidae ===
- Carcharodus alceae (Esper, 1780)
- Carcharodus floccifera (Zeller, 1847)
- Carcharodus lavatherae (Esper, 1783)
- Carcharodus orientalis Reverdin, 1913
- Erynnis marloyi (Boisduval, 1834)
- Erynnis tages (Linnaeus, 1758)
- Gegenes nostrodamus (Fabricius, 1793)
- Hesperia comma (Linnaeus, 1758)
- Muschampia cribrellum (Eversmann, 1841)
- Muschampia proto (Ochsenheimer, 1808)
- Muschampia tessellum (Hübner, 1803)
- Ochlodes sylvanus (Esper, 1777)
- Pyrgus alveus (Hübner, 1803)
- Pyrgus andromedae (Wallengren, 1853)
- Pyrgus armoricanus (Oberthur, 1910)
- Pyrgus carthami (Hübner, 1813)
- Pyrgus cinarae (Rambur, 1839)
- Pyrgus malvae (Linnaeus, 1758)
- Pyrgus serratulae (Rambur, 1839)
- Pyrgus sidae (Esper, 1784)
- Spialia orbifer (Hübner, 1823)
- Spialia phlomidis (Herrich-Schäffer, 1845)
- Thymelicus acteon (Rottemburg, 1775)
- Thymelicus lineola (Ochsenheimer, 1808)
- Thymelicus sylvestris (Poda, 1761)

=== Lycaenidae ===
- Agriades dardanus (Freyer, 1845)
- Agriades optilete (Knoch, 1781)
- Aricia agestis (Denis & Schiffermüller, 1775)
- Aricia anteros (Freyer, 1838)
- Aricia artaxerxes (Fabricius, 1793)
- Callophrys rubi (Linnaeus, 1758)
- Celastrina argiolus (Linnaeus, 1758)
- Cupido minimus (Fuessly, 1775)
- Cupido osiris (Meigen, 1829)
- Cupido alcetas (Hoffmannsegg, 1804)
- Cupido argiades (Pallas, 1771)
- Cupido decolorata (Staudinger, 1886)
- Cyaniris semiargus (Rottemburg, 1775)
- Eumedonia eumedon (Esper, 1780)
- Favonius quercus (Linnaeus, 1758)
- Glaucopsyche alexis (Poda, 1761)
- Iolana iolas (Ochsenheimer, 1816)
- Kretania sephirus (Frivaldszky, 1835)
- Lampides boeticus (Linnaeus, 1767)
- Leptotes pirithous (Linnaeus, 1767)
- Lycaena alciphron (Rottemburg, 1775)
- Lycaena candens (Herrich-Schäffer, 1844)
- Lycaena dispar (Haworth, 1802)
- Lycaena ottomanus (Lefebvre, 1830)
- Lycaena phlaeas (Linnaeus, 1761)
- Lycaena thersamon (Esper, 1784)
- Lycaena thetis Klug, 1834
- Lycaena tityrus (Poda, 1761)
- Lycaena virgaureae (Linnaeus, 1758)
- Lysandra bellargus (Rottemburg, 1775)
- Lysandra coridon (Poda, 1761)
- Phengaris alcon (Denis & Schiffermüller, 1775)
- Phengaris arion (Linnaeus, 1758)
- Plebejus argus (Linnaeus, 1758)
- Plebejus argyrognomon (Bergstrasser, 1779)
- Plebejus idas (Linnaeus, 1761)
- Polyommatus admetus (Esper, 1783)
- Polyommatus damon (Denis & Schiffermüller, 1775)
- Polyommatus ripartii (Freyer, 1830)
- Polyommatus daphnis (Denis & Schiffermüller, 1775)
- Polyommatus amandus (Schneider, 1792)
- Polyommatus dorylas (Denis & Schiffermüller, 1775)
- Polyommatus eros (Ochsenheimer, 1808)
- Polyommatus escheri (Hübner, 1823)
- Polyommatus icarus (Rottemburg, 1775)
- Polyommatus thersites (Cantener, 1835)
- Pseudophilotes bavius (Eversmann, 1832)
- Pseudophilotes vicrama (Moore, 1865)
- Satyrium acaciae (Fabricius, 1787)
- Satyrium ilicis (Esper, 1779)
- Satyrium pruni (Linnaeus, 1758)
- Satyrium spini (Denis & Schiffermüller, 1775)
- Satyrium w-album (Knoch, 1782)
- Scolitantides orion (Pallas, 1771)
- Tarucus balkanica (Freyer, 1844)
- Thecla betulae (Linnaeus, 1758)

=== Nymphalidae ===
- Aglais io (Linnaeus, 1758)
- Aglais urticae (Linnaeus, 1758)
- Apatura ilia (Denis & Schiffermüller, 1775)
- Apatura iris (Linnaeus, 1758)
- Apatura metis Freyer, 1829
- Aphantopus hyperantus (Linnaeus, 1758)
- Arethusana arethusa (Denis & Schiffermüller, 1775)
- Argynnis paphia (Linnaeus, 1758)
- Argynnis pandora (Denis & Schiffermüller, 1775)
- Boloria graeca (Staudinger, 1870)
- Boloria pales (Denis & Schiffermüller, 1775)
- Boloria dia (Linnaeus, 1767)
- Boloria euphrosyne (Linnaeus, 1758)
- Brenthis daphne (Bergstrasser, 1780)
- Brenthis hecate (Denis & Schiffermüller, 1775)
- Brenthis ino (Rottemburg, 1775)
- Brintesia circe (Fabricius, 1775)
- Chazara briseis (Linnaeus, 1764)
- Coenonympha arcania (Linnaeus, 1761)
- Coenonympha glycerion (Borkhausen, 1788)
- Coenonympha leander (Esper, 1784)
- Coenonympha pamphilus (Linnaeus, 1758)
- Coenonympha rhodopensis Elwes, 1900
- Erebia aethiops (Esper, 1777)
- Erebia alberganus (de Prunner, 1798)
- Erebia cassioides (Reiner & Hochenwarth, 1792)
- Erebia epiphron (Knoch, 1783)
- Erebia euryale (Esper, 1805)
- Erebia gorge (Hübner, 1804)
- Erebia ligea (Linnaeus, 1758)
- Erebia medusa (Denis & Schiffermüller, 1775)
- Erebia melas (Herbst, 1796)
- Erebia oeme (Hübner, 1804)
- Erebia ottomana Herrich-Schäffer, 1847
- Erebia pandrose (Borkhausen, 1788)
- Erebia pronoe (Esper, 1780)
- Erebia rhodopensis Nicholl, 1900
- Euphydryas aurinia (Rottemburg, 1775)
- Euphydryas maturna (Linnaeus, 1758)
- Fabriciana adippe (Denis & Schiffermüller, 1775)
- Fabriciana niobe (Linnaeus, 1758)
- Hipparchia fagi (Scopoli, 1763)
- Hipparchia syriaca (Staudinger, 1871)
- Hipparchia fatua Freyer, 1844
- Hipparchia statilinus (Hufnagel, 1766)
- Hipparchia semele (Linnaeus, 1758)
- Hipparchia senthes (Fruhstorfer, 1908)
- Hipparchia volgensis (Mazochin-Porshnjakov, 1952)
- Hyponephele lupinus (O. Costa, 1836)
- Hyponephele lycaon (Rottemburg, 1775)
- Issoria lathonia (Linnaeus, 1758)
- Kirinia climene (Esper, 1783)
- Kirinia roxelana (Cramer, 1777)
- Lasiommata maera (Linnaeus, 1758)
- Lasiommata megera (Linnaeus, 1767)
- Lasiommata petropolitana (Fabricius, 1787)
- Libythea celtis (Laicharting, 1782)
- Limenitis camilla (Linnaeus, 1764)
- Limenitis populi (Linnaeus, 1758)
- Limenitis reducta Staudinger, 1901
- Maniola jurtina (Linnaeus, 1758)
- Melanargia galathea (Linnaeus, 1758)
- Melanargia larissa (Geyer, 1828)
- Melanargia russiae (Esper, 1783)
- Melitaea arduinna (Esper, 1783)
- Melitaea athalia (Rottemburg, 1775)
- Melitaea cinxia (Linnaeus, 1758)
- Melitaea diamina (Lang, 1789)
- Melitaea didyma (Esper, 1778)
- Melitaea phoebe (Denis & Schiffermüller, 1775)
- Melitaea trivia (Denis & Schiffermüller, 1775)
- Minois dryas (Scopoli, 1763)
- Neptis rivularis (Scopoli, 1763)
- Neptis sappho (Pallas, 1771)
- Nymphalis antiopa (Linnaeus, 1758)
- Nymphalis polychloros (Linnaeus, 1758)
- Nymphalis xanthomelas (Esper, 1781)
- Pararge aegeria (Linnaeus, 1758)
- Polygonia c-album (Linnaeus, 1758)
- Polygonia egea (Cramer, 1775)
- Pseudochazara anthelea (Hübner, 1824)
- Pseudochazara cingovskii Gross, 1973
- Pseudochazara geyeri (Herrich-Schäffer, 1846)
- Pseudochazara graeca (Staudinger, 1870)
- Pyronia cecilia (Vallantin, 1894)
- Pyronia tithonus (Linnaeus, 1767)
- Satyrus ferula (Fabricius, 1793)
- Speyeria aglaja (Linnaeus, 1758)
- Vanessa atalanta (Linnaeus, 1758)
- Vanessa cardui (Linnaeus, 1758)

=== Papilionidae ===
- Iphiclides podalirius (Linnaeus, 1758)
- Papilio alexanor Esper, 1800
- Papilio machaon Linnaeus, 1758
- Parnassius apollo (Linnaeus, 1758)
- Parnassius mnemosyne (Linnaeus, 1758)
- Zerynthia cerisy (Godart, 1824)
- Zerynthia polyxena (Denis & Schiffermüller, 1775)

=== Pieridae ===
- Anthocharis cardamines (Linnaeus, 1758)
- Anthocharis damone Boisduval, 1836
- Anthocharis gruneri Herrich-Schäffer, 1851
- Aporia crataegi (Linnaeus, 1758)
- Colias alfacariensis Ribbe, 1905
- Colias caucasica Staudinger, 1871
- Colias croceus (Fourcroy, 1785)
- Colias erate (Esper, 1805)
- Colias hyale (Linnaeus, 1758)
- Euchloe penia (Freyer, 1851)
- Euchloe ausonia (Hübner, 1804)
- Gonepteryx farinosa (Zeller, 1847)
- Gonepteryx rhamni (Linnaeus, 1758)
- Leptidea duponcheli (Staudinger, 1871)
- Leptidea sinapis (Linnaeus, 1758)
- Pieris balcana Lorkovic, 1970
- Pieris brassicae (Linnaeus, 1758)
- Pieris ergane (Geyer, 1828)
- Pieris krueperi Staudinger, 1860
- Pieris mannii (Mayer, 1851)
- Pieris napi (Linnaeus, 1758)
- Pieris rapae (Linnaeus, 1758)
- Pontia chloridice (Hübner, 1813)
- Pontia edusa (Fabricius, 1777)

=== Riodinidae ===
- Hamearis lucina (Linnaeus, 1758)

== Moths ==
=== Adelidae ===
- Adela australis (Heydenreich, 1851)
- Adela croesella (Scopoli, 1763)
- Adela homalella Staudinger, 1859
- Adela reaumurella (Linnaeus, 1758)
- Adela violella (Denis & Schiffermüller, 1775)
- Cauchas fibulella (Denis & Schiffermüller, 1775)
- Cauchas leucocerella (Scopoli, 1763)
- Cauchas rufifrontella (Treitschke, 1833)
- Cauchas rufimitrella (Scopoli, 1763)
- Nematopogon robertella (Clerck, 1759)
- Nematopogon schwarziellus Zeller, 1839
- Nemophora dumerilella (Duponchel, 1839)
- Nemophora fasciella (Fabricius, 1775)
- Nemophora metallica (Poda, 1761)
- Nemophora prodigellus (Zeller, 1853)
- Nemophora raddaella (Hübner, 1793)

=== Alucitidae ===
- Alucita bidentata Scholz & Jackh, 1994
- Alucita cancellata (Meyrick, 1908)
- Alucita cymatodactyla Zeller, 1852
- Alucita desmodactyla Zeller, 1847
- Alucita grammodactyla Zeller, 1841
- Alucita huebneri Wallengren, 1859
- Alucita major (Rebel, 1906)
- Alucita palodactyla Zeller, 1847

=== Argyresthiidae ===
- Argyresthia albistria (Haworth, 1828)
- Argyresthia aurulentella Stainton, 1849
- Argyresthia goedartella (Linnaeus, 1758)
- Argyresthia kasyi Friese, 1963
- Argyresthia pruniella (Clerck, 1759)
- Argyresthia impura Staudinger, 1880

=== Autostichidae ===
- Amselina cedestiella (Zeller, 1868)
- Amselina kasyi (Gozmany, 1961)
- Apatema mediopallidum Walsingham, 1900
- Apatema sutteri Gozmany, 1997
- Aprominta atricanella (Rebel, 1906)
- Aprominta designatella (Herrich-Schäffer, 1855)
- Dysspastus undecimpunctella (Mann, 1864)
- Holcopogon bubulcellus (Staudinger, 1859)
- Nukusa cinerella (Rebel, 1941)
- Oegoconia deauratella (Herrich-Schäffer, 1854)
- Oegoconia novimundi (Busck, 1915)
- Pantacordis pantsa (Gozmany, 1963)

=== Bedelliidae ===
- Bedellia somnulentella (Zeller, 1847)

=== Blastobasidae ===
- Blastobasis phycidella (Zeller, 1839)
- Hypatopa inunctella Zeller, 1839

=== Brachodidae ===
- Brachodes nana (Treitschke, 1834)
- Brachodes pumila (Ochsenheimer, 1808)
- Brachodes tristis (Staudinger, 1879)

=== Brahmaeidae ===
- Lemonia balcanica (Herrich-Schäffer, 1847)
- Lemonia dumi (Linnaeus, 1761)
- Lemonia taraxaci (Denis & Schiffermüller, 1775)

=== Bucculatricidae ===
- Bucculatrix albedinella (Zeller, 1839)
- Bucculatrix albella Stainton, 1867
- Bucculatrix bechsteinella (Bechstein & Scharfenberg, 1805)
- Bucculatrix benacicolella Hartig, 1937
- Bucculatrix cantabricella Chretien, 1898
- Bucculatrix cidarella (Zeller, 1839)
- Bucculatrix demaryella (Duponchel, 1840)
- Bucculatrix frangutella (Goeze, 1783)
- Bucculatrix herbalbella Chretien, 1915
- Bucculatrix infans Staudinger, 1880
- Bucculatrix nigricomella (Zeller, 1839)
- Bucculatrix pseudosylvella Rebel, 1941
- Bucculatrix thoracella (Thunberg, 1794)
- Bucculatrix ulmella Zeller, 1848
- Bucculatrix ulmifoliae M. Hering, 1931
- Bucculatrix zizyphella Chretien, 1907

=== Carposinidae ===
- Carposina berberidella Herrich-Schäffer, 1854
- Carposina scirrhosella Herrich-Schäffer, 1854

=== Chimabachidae ===
- Diurnea fagella (Denis & Schiffermüller, 1775)

=== Choreutidae ===
- Choreutis nemorana (Hübner, 1799)
- Choreutis pariana (Clerck, 1759)
- Prochoreutis myllerana (Fabricius, 1794)
- Prochoreutis stellaris (Zeller, 1847)
- Tebenna micalis (Mann, 1857)

=== Coleophoridae ===
- Augasma aeratella (Zeller, 1839)
- Coleophora acrisella Milliere, 1872
- Coleophora adelogrammella Zeller, 1849
- Coleophora agrianella Rebel, 1934
- Coleophora albella (Thunberg, 1788)
- Coleophora albicostella (Duponchel, 1842)
- Coleophora alcyonipennella (Kollar, 1832)
- Coleophora aleramica Baldizzone & Stubner, 2007
- Coleophora amethystinella Ragonot, 1855
- Coleophora angustiorella Fuchs, 1903
- Coleophora audeoudi Rebel, 1935
- Coleophora ballotella (Fischer v. Röslerstamm, 1839)
- Coleophora bilineatella Zeller, 1849
- Coleophora binotapennella (Duponchel, 1843)
- Coleophora brevipalpella Wocke, 1874
- Coleophora caespititiella Zeller, 1839
- Coleophora cartilaginella Christoph, 1872
- Coleophora coarctataephaga Toll, 1961
- Coleophora conspicuella Zeller, 1849
- Coleophora coronillae Zeller, 1849
- Coleophora corsicella Walsingham, 1898
- Coleophora currucipennella Zeller, 1839
- Coleophora deauratella Lienig & Zeller, 1846
- Coleophora dentiferella Toll, 1952
- Coleophora depunctella Toll, 1961
- Coleophora ditella Zeller, 1849
- Coleophora eupepla Gozmany, 1954
- Coleophora eupreta Walsingham, 1907
- Coleophora flaviella Mann, 1857
- Coleophora flavipennella (Duponchel, 1843)
- Coleophora fuscociliella Zeller, 1849
- Coleophora galbulipennella Zeller, 1838
- Coleophora genistae Stainton, 1857
- Coleophora kasyi Toll, 1961
- Coleophora kautzi Rebel, 1933
- Coleophora kuehnella (Goeze, 1783)
- Coleophora lenae Glaser, 1969
- Coleophora lessinica Baldizzone, 1980
- Coleophora limosipennella (Duponchel, 1843)
- Coleophora lineolea (Haworth, 1828)
- Coleophora lutipennella (Zeller, 1838)
- Coleophora macedonica Toll, 1959
- Coleophora mayrella (Hübner, 1813)
- Coleophora medelichensis Krone, 1908
- Coleophora meridionella Rebel, 1912
- Coleophora milvipennis Zeller, 1839
- Coleophora narbonensis Baldizzone, 1990
- Coleophora nigridorsella Amsel, 1935
- Coleophora niveicostella Zeller, 1839
- Coleophora nubivagella Zeller, 1849
- Coleophora nutantella Muhlig & Frey, 1857
- Coleophora obtectella Zeller, 1849
- Coleophora ochrea (Haworth, 1828)
- Coleophora odorariella Muhlig, 1857
- Coleophora onobrychiella Zeller, 1849
- Coleophora ononidella Milliere, 1879
- Coleophora onopordiella Zeller, 1849
- Coleophora ornatipennella (Hübner, 1796)
- Coleophora otidipennella (Hübner, 1817)
- Coleophora paramayrella Nel, 1993
- Coleophora pennella (Denis & Schiffermüller, 1775)
- Coleophora preisseckeri Toll, 1942
- Coleophora quadristraminella Toll, 1961
- Coleophora riffelensis Rebel, 1913
- Coleophora saxicolella (Duponchel, 1843)
- Coleophora scabrida Toll, 1959
- Coleophora serratulella Herrich-Schäffer, 1855
- Coleophora silenella Herrich-Schäffer, 1855
- Coleophora sternipennella (Zetterstedt, 1839)
- Coleophora stramentella Zeller, 1849
- Coleophora treskaensis Toll & Amsel, 1967
- Coleophora trifolii (Curtis, 1832)
- Coleophora valesianella Zeller, 1849
- Coleophora variicornis Toll, 1952
- Coleophora vestianella (Linnaeus, 1758)
- Coleophora vibicigerella Zeller, 1839
- Coleophora virgatella Zeller, 1849
- Coleophora vulnerariae Zeller, 1839
- Coleophora vulpecula Zeller, 1849
- Coleophora wockeella Zeller, 1849
- Coleophora zelleriella Heinemann, 1854

=== Cosmopterigidae ===
- Eteobalea albiapicella (Duponchel, 1843)
- Eteobalea intermediella (Riedl, 1966)
- Eteobalea isabellella (O. G. Costa, 1836)
- Eteobalea serratella (Treitschke, 1833)
- Eteobalea sumptuosella (Lederer, 1855)
- Gisilia stereodoxa (Meyrick, 1925)
- Hodgesiella rebeli (Krone, 1905)
- Isidiella nickerlii (Nickerl, 1864)
- Limnaecia phragmitella Stainton, 1851
- Pancalia leuwenhoekella (Linnaeus, 1761)
- Pancalia schwarzella (Fabricius, 1798)
- Pyroderces argyrogrammos (Zeller, 1847)
- Sorhagenia lophyrella (Douglas, 1846)
- Stagmatophora heydeniella (Fischer von Röslerstamm, 1838)
- Vulcaniella cognatella Riedl, 1990
- Vulcaniella grandiferella Sinev, 1986
- Vulcaniella klimeschi (Riedl, 1966)

=== Cossidae ===
- Cossus cossus (Linnaeus, 1758)
- Dyspessa salicicola (Eversmann, 1848)
- Dyspessa ulula (Borkhausen, 1790)
- Parahypopta caestrum (Hübner, 1808)
- Phragmataecia castaneae (Hübner, 1790)
- Zeuzera pyrina (Linnaeus, 1761)

=== Crambidae ===
- Achyra nudalis (Hübner, 1796)
- Agriphila brioniellus (Zerny, 1914)
- Agriphila dalmatinellus (Hampson, 1900)
- Agriphila deliella (Hübner, 1813)
- Agriphila geniculea (Haworth, 1811)
- Agriphila inquinatella (Denis & Schiffermüller, 1775)
- Agriphila straminella (Denis & Schiffermüller, 1775)
- Agriphila tolli (Błeszyński, 1952)
- Agriphila tristella (Denis & Schiffermüller, 1775)
- Agrotera nemoralis (Scopoli, 1763)
- Anania coronata (Hufnagel, 1767)
- Anania crocealis (Hübner, 1796)
- Anania funebris (Strom, 1768)
- Anania fuscalis (Denis & Schiffermüller, 1775)
- Anania hortulata (Linnaeus, 1758)
- Anania testacealis (Zeller, 1847)
- Anania verbascalis (Denis & Schiffermüller, 1775)
- Anarpia incertalis (Duponchel, 1832)
- Ancylolomia palpella (Denis & Schiffermüller, 1775)
- Ancylolomia pectinatellus (Zeller, 1847)
- Ancylolomia tentaculella (Hübner, 1796)
- Antigastra catalaunalis (Duponchel, 1833)
- Aporodes floralis (Hübner, 1809)
- Atralata albofascialis (Treitschke, 1829)
- Calamotropha aureliellus (Fischer v. Röslerstamm, 1841)
- Calamotropha paludella (Hübner, 1824)
- Cataclysta lemnata (Linnaeus, 1758)
- Catoptria acutangulellus (Herrich-Schäffer, 1847)
- Catoptria confusellus (Staudinger, 1882)
- Catoptria domaviellus (Rebel, 1904)
- Catoptria falsella (Denis & Schiffermüller, 1775)
- Catoptria fulgidella (Hübner, 1813)
- Catoptria gozmanyi Błeszyński, 1956
- Catoptria kasyi Błeszyński, 1960
- Catoptria languidellus (Zeller, 1863)
- Catoptria lythargyrella (Hübner, 1796)
- Catoptria margaritella (Denis & Schiffermüller, 1775)
- Catoptria mytilella (Hübner, 1805)
- Catoptria pinella (Linnaeus, 1758)
- Chilo phragmitella (Hübner, 1805)
- Cholius luteolaris (Scopoli, 1772)
- Chrysocrambus linetella (Fabricius, 1781)
- Chrysoteuchia culmella (Linnaeus, 1758)
- Crambus lathoniellus (Zincken, 1817)
- Crambus pascuella (Linnaeus, 1758)
- Crambus uliginosellus Zeller, 1850
- Cynaeda dentalis (Denis & Schiffermüller, 1775)
- Cynaeda gigantea (Wocke, 1871)
- Cynaeda superba (Freyer, 1845)
- Diasemia reticularis (Linnaeus, 1761)
- Diasemiopsis ramburialis (Duponchel, 1834)
- Dolicharthria bruguieralis (Duponchel, 1833)
- Dolicharthria punctalis (Denis & Schiffermüller, 1775)
- Dolicharthria stigmosalis (Herrich-Schäffer, 1848)
- Donacaula forficella (Thunberg, 1794)
- Donacaula mucronella (Denis & Schiffermüller, 1775)
- Duponchelia fovealis Zeller, 1847
- Ecpyrrhorrhoe diffusalis (Guenee, 1854)
- Ecpyrrhorrhoe rubiginalis (Hübner, 1796)
- Elophila nymphaeata (Linnaeus, 1758)
- Epascestria pustulalis (Hübner, 1823)
- Ephelis cruentalis (Geyer, 1832)
- Euchromius bella (Hübner, 1796)
- Euchromius ocellea (Haworth, 1811)
- Euchromius superbellus (Zeller, 1849)
- Euclasta splendidalis (Herrich-Schäffer, 1848)
- Eudonia delunella (Stainton, 1849)
- Eudonia lacustrata (Panzer, 1804)
- Eudonia laetella (Zeller, 1846)
- Eudonia murana (Curtis, 1827)
- Eudonia pallida (Curtis, 1827)
- Eudonia petrophila (Standfuss, 1848)
- Eudonia phaeoleuca (Zeller, 1846)
- Eurrhypis pollinalis (Denis & Schiffermüller, 1775)
- Evergestis aenealis (Denis & Schiffermüller, 1775)
- Evergestis caesialis (Herrich-Schäffer, 1849)
- Evergestis frumentalis (Linnaeus, 1761)
- Evergestis limbata (Linnaeus, 1767)
- Evergestis segetalis (Herrich-Schäffer, 1851)
- Evergestis serratalis (Staudinger, 1871)
- Evergestis sophialis (Fabricius, 1787)
- Evergestis subfuscalis (Staudinger, 1871)
- Friedlanderia cicatricella (Hübner, 1824)
- Heliothela wulfeniana (Scopoli, 1763)
- Hyperlais argillacealis (Zeller, 1847)
- Hyperlais dulcinalis (Treitschke, 1835)
- Loxostege aeruginalis (Hübner, 1796)
- Loxostege deliblatica Szent-Ivany & Uhrik-Meszaros, 1942
- Loxostege manualis (Geyer, 1832)
- Loxostege mucosalis (Herrich-Schäffer, 1848)
- Loxostege sticticalis (Linnaeus, 1761)
- Mecyna flavalis (Denis & Schiffermüller, 1775)
- Mecyna lutealis (Duponchel, 1833)
- Mecyna trinalis (Denis & Schiffermüller, 1775)
- Mesocrambus candiellus (Herrich-Schäffer, 1848)
- Metacrambus carectellus (Zeller, 1847)
- Metasia carnealis (Treitschke, 1829)
- Metasia ophialis (Treitschke, 1829)
- Metasia suppandalis (Hübner, 1823)
- Metaxmeste phrygialis (Hübner, 1796)
- Metaxmeste schrankiana (Hochenwarth, 1785)
- Neocrambus wolfschlaegeri (Schawerda, 1937)
- Nomophila noctuella (Denis & Schiffermüller, 1775)
- Nymphula nitidulata (Hufnagel, 1767)
- Orenaia alpestralis (Fabricius, 1787)
- Ostrinia nubilalis (Hübner, 1796)
- Ostrinia quadripunctalis (Denis & Schiffermüller, 1775)
- Palpita vitrealis (Rossi, 1794)
- Paracorsia repandalis (Denis & Schiffermüller, 1775)
- Parapoynx stratiotata (Linnaeus, 1758)
- Paratalanta hyalinalis (Hübner, 1796)
- Pediasia contaminella (Hübner, 1796)
- Pediasia jucundellus (Herrich-Schäffer, 1847)
- Pediasia luteella (Denis & Schiffermüller, 1775)
- Pediasia matricella (Treitschke, 1832)
- Platytes cerussella (Denis & Schiffermüller, 1775)
- Pleuroptya balteata (Fabricius, 1798)
- Pleuroptya ruralis (Scopoli, 1763)
- Psammotis pulveralis (Hübner, 1796)
- Pyrausta aerealis (Hübner, 1793)
- Pyrausta aurata (Scopoli, 1763)
- Pyrausta castalis Treitschke, 1829
- Pyrausta cingulata (Linnaeus, 1758)
- Pyrausta coracinalis Leraut, 1982
- Pyrausta despicata (Scopoli, 1763)
- Pyrausta falcatalis Guenee, 1854
- Pyrausta obfuscata (Scopoli, 1763)
- Pyrausta ostrinalis (Hübner, 1796)
- Pyrausta purpuralis (Linnaeus, 1758)
- Pyrausta sanguinalis (Linnaeus, 1767)
- Pyrausta trimaculalis (Staudinger, 1867)
- Pyrausta virginalis Duponchel, 1832
- Schoenobius gigantella (Denis & Schiffermüller, 1775)
- Scirpophaga praelata (Scopoli, 1763)
- Scoparia ambigualis (Treitschke, 1829)
- Scoparia basistrigalis Knaggs, 1866
- Scoparia ingratella (Zeller, 1846)
- Scoparia manifestella (Herrich-Schäffer, 1848)
- Scoparia perplexella (Zeller, 1839)
- Scoparia pyralella (Denis & Schiffermüller, 1775)
- Scoparia subfusca Haworth, 1811
- Sitochroa palealis (Denis & Schiffermüller, 1775)
- Sitochroa verticalis (Linnaeus, 1758)
- Tegostoma comparalis (Hübner, 1796)
- Thisanotia chrysonuchella (Scopoli, 1763)
- Titanio normalis (Hübner, 1796)
- Titanio venustalis (Lederer, 1855)
- Udea ferrugalis (Hübner, 1796)
- Udea fimbriatralis (Duponchel, 1834)
- Udea fulvalis (Hübner, 1809)
- Udea institalis (Hübner, 1819)
- Udea olivalis (Denis & Schiffermüller, 1775)
- Udea prunalis (Denis & Schiffermüller, 1775)
- Udea rhododendronalis (Duponchel, 1834)
- Udea uliginosalis (Stephens, 1834)
- Uresiphita gilvata (Fabricius, 1794)
- Xanthocrambus saxonellus (Zincken, 1821)

=== Douglasiidae ===
- Klimeschia transversella (Zeller, 1839)
- Tinagma hedemanni (Caradja, 1920)
- Tinagma ocnerostomella (Stainton, 1850)
- Tinagma perdicella Zeller, 1839

=== Drepanidae ===
- Asphalia ruficollis (Denis & Schiffermüller, 1775)
- Cilix asiatica O. Bang-Haas, 1907
- Cilix glaucata (Scopoli, 1763)
- Cymatophorina diluta (Denis & Schiffermüller, 1775)
- Drepana falcataria (Linnaeus, 1758)
- Habrosyne pyritoides (Hufnagel, 1766)
- Polyploca ridens (Fabricius, 1787)
- Tethea ocularis (Linnaeus, 1767)
- Tethea or (Denis & Schiffermüller, 1775)
- Thyatira batis (Linnaeus, 1758)
- Watsonalla binaria (Hufnagel, 1767)
- Watsonalla cultraria (Fabricius, 1775)
- Watsonalla uncinula (Borkhausen, 1790)

=== Elachistidae ===
- Agonopterix adspersella (Kollar, 1832)
- Agonopterix alstromeriana (Clerck, 1759)
- Agonopterix cervariella (Constant, 1884)
- Agonopterix cnicella (Treitschke, 1832)
- Agonopterix curvipunctosa (Haworth, 1811)
- Agonopterix doronicella (Wocke, 1849)
- Agonopterix furvella (Treitschke, 1832)
- Agonopterix heracliana (Linnaeus, 1758)
- Agonopterix kaekeritziana (Linnaeus, 1767)
- Agonopterix laterella (Denis & Schiffermüller, 1775)
- Agonopterix nanatella (Stainton, 1849)
- Agonopterix nodiflorella (Milliere, 1866)
- Agonopterix ocellana (Fabricius, 1775)
- Agonopterix oinochroa (Turati, 1879)
- Agonopterix pallorella (Zeller, 1839)
- Agonopterix propinquella (Treitschke, 1835)
- Agonopterix purpurea (Haworth, 1811)
- Agonopterix quadripunctata (Wocke, 1857)
- Agonopterix rutana (Fabricius, 1794)
- Agonopterix squamosa (Mann, 1864)
- Agonopterix subpropinquella (Stainton, 1849)
- Agonopterix thurneri (Rebel, 1941)
- Agonopterix yeatiana (Fabricius, 1781)
- Anchinia daphnella (Denis & Schiffermüller, 1775)
- Anchinia laureolella Herrich-Schäffer, 1854
- Blastodacna atra (Haworth, 1828)
- Cacochroa permixtella (Herrich-Schäffer, 1854)
- Chrysoclista splendida Karsholt, 1997
- Depressaria absynthiella Herrich-Schäffer, 1865
- Depressaria albipunctella (Denis & Schiffermüller, 1775)
- Depressaria badiella (Hübner, 1796)
- Depressaria beckmanni Heinemann, 1870
- Depressaria chaerophylli Zeller, 1839
- Depressaria depressana (Fabricius, 1775)
- Depressaria discipunctella Herrich-Schäffer, 1854
- Depressaria douglasella Stainton, 1849
- Depressaria libanotidella Schlager, 1849
- Depressaria marcella Rebel, 1901
- Depressaria radiella (Goeze, 1783)
- Depressaria tenebricosa Zeller, 1854
- Depressaria ululana Rossler, 1866
- Depressaria erinaceella Staudinger, 1870
- Depressaria hirtipalpis Zeller, 1854
- Depressaria dictamnella (Treitschke, 1835)
- Depressaria moranella Chretien, 1907
- Dystebenna stephensi (Stainton, 1849)
- Elachista drenovoi Parenti, 1981
- Elachista dumosa Parenti, 1981
- Elachista maculata Parenti, 1978
- Elachista occulta Parenti, 1978
- Elachista ohridella Parenti, 2001
- Elachista vegliae Parenti, 1978
- Ethmia aurifluella (Hübner, 1810)
- Ethmia bipunctella (Fabricius, 1775)
- Ethmia candidella (Alphéraky, 1908)
- Ethmia chrysopygella (Kolenati, 1846)
- Ethmia flavianella (Treitschke, 1832)
- Ethmia haemorrhoidella (Eversmann, 1844)
- Ethmia terminella T. B. Fletcher, 1938
- Ethmia tripunctella (Staudinger, 1879)
- Exaeretia culcitella (Herrich-Schäffer, 1854)
- Exaeretia ledereri (Zeller, 1854)
- Exaeretia lutosella (Herrich-Schäffer, 1854)
- Fuchsia luteella (Heinemann, 1870)
- Haplochrois albanica (Rebel & Zerny, 1932)
- Haplochrois ochraceella (Rebel, 1903)
- Heinemannia festivella (Denis & Schiffermüller, 1775)
- Heinemannia laspeyrella (Hübner, 1796)
- Hypercallia citrinalis (Scopoli, 1763)
- Luquetia lobella (Denis & Schiffermüller, 1775)
- Luquetia orientella (Rebel, 1893)
- Orophia denisella (Denis & Schiffermüller, 1775)
- Orophia ferrugella (Denis & Schiffermüller, 1775)
- Orophia sordidella (Hübner, 1796)
- Spuleria flavicaput (Haworth, 1828)
- Telechrysis tripuncta (Haworth, 1828)

=== Endromidae ===
- Endromis versicolora (Linnaeus, 1758)

=== Epermeniidae ===
- Epermenia aequidentellus (E. Hofmann, 1867)
- Epermenia illigerella (Hübner, 1813)
- Epermenia insecurella (Stainton, 1854)
- Epermenia ochreomaculellus (Milliere, 1854)
- Epermenia pontificella (Hübner, 1796)
- Ochromolopis ictella (Hübner, 1813)

=== Erebidae ===
- Amata kruegeri (Ragusa, 1904)
- Amata phegea (Linnaeus, 1758)
- Apopestes spectrum (Esper, 1787)
- Arctia caja (Linnaeus, 1758)
- Arctia festiva (Hufnagel, 1766)
- Arctia villica (Linnaeus, 1758)
- Arctornis l-nigrum (Muller, 1764)
- Autophila dilucida (Hübner, 1808)
- Autophila limbata (Staudinger, 1871)
- Autophila anaphanes Boursin, 1940
- Callimorpha dominula (Linnaeus, 1758)
- Calliteara pudibunda (Linnaeus, 1758)
- Calymma communimacula (Denis & Schiffermüller, 1775)
- Calyptra thalictri (Borkhausen, 1790)
- Catephia alchymista (Denis & Schiffermüller, 1775)
- Catocala coniuncta (Esper, 1787)
- Catocala conversa (Esper, 1783)
- Catocala dilecta (Hübner, 1808)
- Catocala disjuncta (Geyer, 1828)
- Catocala diversa (Geyer, 1828)
- Catocala electa (Vieweg, 1790)
- Catocala elocata (Esper, 1787)
- Catocala fraxini (Linnaeus, 1758)
- Catocala fulminea (Scopoli, 1763)
- Catocala hymenaea (Denis & Schiffermüller, 1775)
- Catocala lupina Herrich-Schäffer, 1851
- Catocala nupta (Linnaeus, 1767)
- Catocala nymphaea (Esper, 1787)
- Catocala nymphagoga (Esper, 1787)
- Catocala promissa (Denis & Schiffermüller, 1775)
- Catocala puerpera (Giorna, 1791)
- Catocala sponsa (Linnaeus, 1767)
- Chelis maculosa (Gerning, 1780)
- Clytie syriaca (Bugnion, 1837)
- Colobochyla salicalis (Denis & Schiffermüller, 1775)
- Coscinia cribraria (Linnaeus, 1758)
- Coscinia striata (Linnaeus, 1758)
- Cybosia mesomella (Linnaeus, 1758)
- Cymbalophora rivularis (Menetries, 1832)
- Diacrisia sannio (Linnaeus, 1758)
- Diaphora mendica (Clerck, 1759)
- Drasteria cailino (Lefebvre, 1827)
- Dysauxes ancilla (Linnaeus, 1767)
- Dysauxes famula (Freyer, 1836)
- Dysauxes punctata (Fabricius, 1781)
- Dysgonia algira (Linnaeus, 1767)
- Dysgonia torrida (Guenee, 1852)
- Eilema caniola (Hübner, 1808)
- Eilema complana (Linnaeus, 1758)
- Eilema costalis (Zeller, 1847)
- Eilema lurideola (Zincken, 1817)
- Eilema palliatella (Scopoli, 1763)
- Eilema pygmaeola (Doubleday, 1847)
- Eilema sororcula (Hufnagel, 1766)
- Eublemma amoena (Hübner, 1803)
- Eublemma himmighoffeni (Milliere, 1867)
- Eublemma minutata (Fabricius, 1794)
- Eublemma ochreola (Staudinger, 1900)
- Eublemma ostrina (Hübner, 1808)
- Eublemma parva (Hübner, 1808)
- Eublemma polygramma (Duponchel, 1842)
- Eublemma purpurina (Denis & Schiffermüller, 1775)
- Eublemma scitula Rambur, 1833
- Eublemma viridula (Guenee, 1841)
- Euclidia mi (Clerck, 1759)
- Euclidia glyphica (Linnaeus, 1758)
- Euclidia triquetra (Denis & Schiffermüller, 1775)
- Euplagia quadripunctaria (Poda, 1761)
- Euproctis chrysorrhoea (Linnaeus, 1758)
- Euproctis similis (Fuessly, 1775)
- Exophyla rectangularis (Geyer, 1828)
- Grammodes bifasciata (Petagna, 1787)
- Grammodes stolida (Fabricius, 1775)
- Gynaephora selenitica (Esper, 1789)
- Herminia grisealis (Denis & Schiffermüller, 1775)
- Herminia tarsicrinalis (Knoch, 1782)
- Herminia tarsipennalis (Treitschke, 1835)
- Herminia tenuialis (Rebel, 1899)
- Hypena crassalis (Fabricius, 1787)
- Hypena obesalis Treitschke, 1829
- Hypena obsitalis (Hübner, 1813)
- Hypena palpalis (Hübner, 1796)
- Hypena proboscidalis (Linnaeus, 1758)
- Hypena rostralis (Linnaeus, 1758)
- Hypenodes anatolica Schwingenschuss, 1938
- Hypenodes humidalis Doubleday, 1850
- Hyphoraia aulica (Linnaeus, 1758)
- Idia calvaria (Denis & Schiffermüller, 1775)
- Laspeyria flexula (Denis & Schiffermüller, 1775)
- Leucoma salicis (Linnaeus, 1758)
- Lithosia quadra (Linnaeus, 1758)
- Lygephila craccae (Denis & Schiffermüller, 1775)
- Lygephila lusoria (Linnaeus, 1758)
- Lygephila pastinum (Treitschke, 1826)
- Lygephila procax (Hübner, 1813)
- Lygephila viciae (Hübner, 1822)
- Lymantria dispar (Linnaeus, 1758)
- Lymantria monacha (Linnaeus, 1758)
- Metachrostis dardouini (Boisduval, 1840)
- Metachrostis velox (Hübner, 1813)
- Miltochrista miniata (Forster, 1771)
- Minucia lunaris (Denis & Schiffermüller, 1775)
- Nodaria nodosalis (Herrich-Schäffer, 1851)
- Ocneria rubea (Denis & Schiffermüller, 1775)
- Ocnogyna parasita (Hübner, 1790)
- Odice arcuinna (Hübner, 1790)
- Odice suava (Hübner, 1813)
- Ophiusa tirhaca (Cramer, 1773)
- Orectis proboscidata (Herrich-Schäffer, 1851)
- Orgyia dubia (Tauscher, 1806)
- Paracolax tristalis (Fabricius, 1794)
- Parascotia fuliginaria (Linnaeus, 1761)
- Parasemia plantaginis (Linnaeus, 1758)
- Parocneria detrita (Esper, 1785)
- Parocneria terebinthi (Freyer, 1838)
- Pechipogo plumigeralis Hübner, 1825
- Pechipogo strigilata (Linnaeus, 1758)
- Pelosia muscerda (Hufnagel, 1766)
- Penthophera morio (Linnaeus, 1767)
- Phragmatobia fuliginosa (Linnaeus, 1758)
- Phragmatobia placida (Frivaldszky, 1835)
- Phytometra viridaria (Clerck, 1759)
- Polypogon gryphalis (Herrich-Schäffer, 1851)
- Polypogon tentacularia (Linnaeus, 1758)
- Rhypagla lacernaria (Hübner, 1813)
- Rhyparia purpurata (Linnaeus, 1758)
- Rivula sericealis (Scopoli, 1763)
- Schrankia costaestrigalis (Stephens, 1834)
- Schrankia taenialis (Hübner, 1809)
- Scoliopteryx libatrix (Linnaeus, 1758)
- Setina irrorella (Linnaeus, 1758)
- Simplicia rectalis (Eversmann, 1842)
- Spilosoma lubricipeda (Linnaeus, 1758)
- Spilosoma lutea (Hufnagel, 1766)
- Spilosoma urticae (Esper, 1789)
- Tathorhynchus exsiccata (Lederer, 1855)
- Trisateles emortualis (Denis & Schiffermüller, 1775)
- Tyria jacobaeae (Linnaeus, 1758)
- Utetheisa pulchella (Linnaeus, 1758)
- Watsonarctia deserta (Bartel, 1902)
- Zanclognatha zelleralis (Wocke, 1850)
- Zebeeba falsalis (Herrich-Schäffer, 1839)
- Zekelita antiqualis (Hübner, 1809)
- Zethes insularis Rambur, 1833

=== Eriocraniidae ===
- Dyseriocrania subpurpurella (Haworth, 1828)

=== Euteliidae ===
- Eutelia adoratrix (Staudinger, 1892)
- Eutelia adulatrix (Hübner, 1813)

=== Gelechiidae ===
- Acompsia cinerella (Clerck, 1759)
- Acompsia ponomarenkoae Huemer & Karsholt, 2002
- Agnippe lunaki (Rebel, 1941)
- Altenia elsneriella Huemer & Karsholt, 1999
- Altenia scriptella (Hübner, 1796)
- Altenia wagneriella (Rebel, 1926)
- Anacampsis timidella (Wocke, 1887)
- Anarsia lineatella Zeller, 1839
- Anarsia spartiella (Schrank, 1802)
- Apodia bifractella (Duponchel, 1843)
- Aproaerema anthyllidella (Hübner, 1813)
- Aristotelia decurtella (Hübner, 1813)
- Aristotelia subericinella (Duponchel, 1843)
- Aroga aristotelis (Milliere, 1876)
- Aroga balcanicola Huemer & Karsholt, 1999
- Aroga flavicomella (Zeller, 1839)
- Aroga velocella (Duponchel, 1838)
- Athrips rancidella (Herrich-Schäffer, 1854)
- Brachmia blandella (Fabricius, 1798)
- Brachmia dimidiella (Denis & Schiffermüller, 1775)
- Bryotropha arabica Amsel, 1952
- Bryotropha azovica Bidzilia, 1997
- Bryotropha domestica (Haworth, 1828)
- Bryotropha hendrikseni Karsholt & Rutten, 2005
- Bryotropha hulli Karsholt & Rutten, 2005
- Bryotropha plebejella (Zeller, 1847)
- Bryotropha sabulosella (Rebel, 1905)
- Bryotropha senectella (Zeller, 1839)
- Bryotropha terrella (Denis & Schiffermüller, 1775)
- Carpatolechia decorella (Haworth, 1812)
- Carpatolechia fugacella (Zeller, 1839)
- Caryocolum alsinella (Zeller, 1868)
- Caryocolum cauligenella (Schmid, 1863)
- Caryocolum fischerella (Treitschke, 1833)
- Caryocolum inflativorella (Klimesch, 1938)
- Caryocolum leucomelanella (Zeller, 1839)
- Caryocolum marmorea (Haworth, 1828)
- Caryocolum mucronatella (Chretien, 1900)
- Caryocolum peregrinella (Herrich-Schäffer, 1854)
- Caryocolum petrophila (Preissecker, 1914)
- Caryocolum proxima (Haworth, 1828)
- Caryocolum saginella (Zeller, 1868)
- Caryocolum schleichi (Christoph, 1872)
- Caryocolum tischeriella (Zeller, 1839)
- Catatinagma trivittellum Rebel, 1903
- Chionodes distinctella (Zeller, 1839)
- Chrysoesthia drurella (Fabricius, 1775)
- Chrysoesthia sexguttella (Thunberg, 1794)
- Crossobela trinotella (Herrich-Schäffer, 1856)
- Dichomeris alacella (Zeller, 1839)
- Dichomeris barbella (Denis & Schiffermüller, 1775)
- Dichomeris juniperella (Linnaeus, 1761)
- Dichomeris limbipunctellus (Staudinger, 1859)
- Dichomeris limosellus (Schlager, 1849)
- Dichomeris marginella (Fabricius, 1781)
- Ephysteris diminutella (Zeller, 1847)
- Ephysteris promptella (Staudinger, 1859)
- Eulamprotes wilkella (Linnaeus, 1758)
- Filatima spurcella (Duponchel, 1843)
- Filatima tephritidella (Duponchel, 1844)
- Gelechia dujardini Huemer, 1991
- Gelechia senticetella (Staudinger, 1859)
- Gnorimoschema herbichii (Nowicki, 1864)
- Helcystogramma triannulella (Herrich-Schäffer, 1854)
- Isophrictis anthemidella (Wocke, 1871)
- Isophrictis kefersteiniellus (Zeller, 1850)
- Isophrictis striatella (Denis & Schiffermüller, 1775)
- Istrianis femoralis (Staudinger, 1876)
- Klimeschiopsis kiningerella (Duponchel, 1843)
- Megacraspedus binotella (Duponchel, 1843)
- Megacraspedus dolosellus (Zeller, 1839)
- Mesophleps silacella (Hübner, 1796)
- Metzneria aestivella (Zeller, 1839)
- Metzneria aprilella (Herrich-Schäffer, 1854)
- Metzneria artificella (Herrich-Schäffer, 1861)
- Metzneria intestinella (Mann, 1864)
- Metzneria lappella (Linnaeus, 1758)
- Metzneria neuropterella (Zeller, 1839)
- Metzneria paucipunctella (Zeller, 1839)
- Mirificarma cytisella (Treitschke, 1833)
- Mirificarma eburnella (Denis & Schiffermüller, 1775)
- Mirificarma maculatella (Hübner, 1796)
- Monochroa conspersella (Herrich-Schäffer, 1854)
- Monochroa cytisella (Curtis, 1837)
- Monochroa lucidella (Stephens, 1834)
- Monochroa nomadella (Zeller, 1868)
- Monochroa sepicolella (Herrich-Schäffer, 1854)
- Neotelphusa sequax (Haworth, 1828)
- Nothris congressariella (Bruand, 1858)
- Nothris lemniscellus (Zeller, 1839)
- Nothris radiata (Staudinger, 1879)
- Nothris verbascella (Denis & Schiffermüller, 1775)
- Ornativalva plutelliformis (Staudinger, 1859)
- Parachronistis albiceps (Zeller, 1839)
- Parastenolechia nigrinotella (Zeller, 1847)
- Pexicopia malvella (Hübner, 1805)
- Phthorimaea operculella (Zeller, 1873)
- Platyedra subcinerea (Haworth, 1828)
- Prolita sexpunctella (Fabricius, 1794)
- Prolita solutella (Zeller, 1839)
- Pseudotelphusa istrella (Mann, 1866)
- Pseudotelphusa paripunctella (Thunberg, 1794)
- Psoricoptera gibbosella (Zeller, 1839)
- Ptocheuusa abnormella (Herrich-Schäffer, 1854)
- Ptocheuusa paupella (Zeller, 1847)
- Pyncostola bohemiella (Nickerl, 1864)
- Recurvaria nanella (Denis & Schiffermüller, 1775)
- Scrobipalpa acuminatella (Sircom, 1850)
- Scrobipalpa artemisiella (Treitschke, 1833)
- Scrobipalpa atriplicella (Fischer von Röslerstamm, 1841)
- Scrobipalpa ergasima (Meyrick, 1916)
- Scrobipalpa erichi Povolny, 1964
- Scrobipalpa kasyi Povolny, 1968
- Scrobipalpa mixta Huemer & Karsholt, 2010
- Scrobipalpa ocellatella (Boyd, 1858)
- Scrobipalpa perinii (Klimesch, 1951)
- Scrobipalpula seniorum Povolny, 2000
- Scrobipalpula tussilaginis (Stainton, 1867)
- Sitotroga cerealella (Olivier, 1789)
- Sophronia ascalis Gozmany, 1951
- Sophronia humerella (Denis & Schiffermüller, 1775)
- Sophronia sicariellus (Zeller, 1839)
- Stenolechiodes pseudogemmellus Elsner, 1996
- Stomopteryx detersella (Zeller, 1847)
- Stomopteryx remissella (Zeller, 1847)
- Syncopacma cinctella (Clerck, 1759)
- Syncopacma coronillella (Treitschke, 1833)
- Syncopacma patruella (Mann, 1857)
- Syncopacma polychromella (Rebel, 1902)
- Syncopacma taeniolella (Zeller, 1839)
- Teleiopsis bagriotella (Duponchel, 1840)
- Teleiopsis diffinis (Haworth, 1828)
- Teleiopsis latisacculus Pitkin, 1988
- Teleiopsis rosalbella (Fologne, 1862)
- Teleiopsis terebinthinella (Herrich-Schäffer, 1856)
- Thiotricha subocellea (Stephens, 1834)
- Xenolechia aethiops (Humphreys & Westwood, 1845)

=== Geometridae ===
- Abraxas grossulariata (Linnaeus, 1758)
- Aethalura punctulata (Denis & Schiffermüller, 1775)
- Alcis bastelbergeri (Hirschke, 1908)
- Alcis jubata (Thunberg, 1788)
- Alcis repandata (Linnaeus, 1758)
- Aleucis distinctata (Herrich-Schäffer, 1839)
- Alsophila aceraria (Denis & Schiffermüller, 1775)
- Alsophila aescularia (Denis & Schiffermüller, 1775)
- Anticlea derivata (Denis & Schiffermüller, 1775)
- Apeira syringaria (Linnaeus, 1758)
- Aplasta ononaria (Fuessly, 1783)
- Aplocera efformata (Guenee, 1858)
- Aplocera plagiata (Linnaeus, 1758)
- Aplocera praeformata (Hübner, 1826)
- Aplocera simpliciata (Treitschke, 1835)
- Apocheima hispidaria (Denis & Schiffermüller, 1775)
- Apochima flabellaria (Heeger, 1838)
- Arichanna melanaria (Linnaeus, 1758)
- Artiora evonymaria (Denis & Schiffermüller, 1775)
- Ascotis selenaria (Denis & Schiffermüller, 1775)
- Aspitates gilvaria (Denis & Schiffermüller, 1775)
- Aspitates ochrearia (Rossi, 1794)
- Asthena albulata (Hufnagel, 1767)
- Asthena anseraria (Herrich-Schäffer, 1855)
- Biston betularia (Linnaeus, 1758)
- Biston strataria (Hufnagel, 1767)
- Cabera exanthemata (Scopoli, 1763)
- Campaea honoraria (Denis & Schiffermüller, 1775)
- Campaea margaritaria (Linnaeus, 1761)
- Camptogramma bilineata (Linnaeus, 1758)
- Camptogramma scripturata (Hübner, 1799)
- Cataclysme riguata (Hübner, 1813)
- Catarhoe cuculata (Hufnagel, 1767)
- Catarhoe permixtaria (Herrich-Schäffer, 1856)
- Catarhoe putridaria (Herrich-Schäffer, 1852)
- Catarhoe rubidata (Denis & Schiffermüller, 1775)
- Celonoptera mirificaria Lederer, 1862
- Chariaspilates formosaria (Eversmann, 1837)
- Charissa certhiatus (Rebel & Zerny, 1931)
- Charissa obscurata (Denis & Schiffermüller, 1775)
- Charissa pentheri (Rebel, 1904)
- Charissa pullata (Denis & Schiffermüller, 1775)
- Charissa variegata (Duponchel, 1830)
- Charissa ambiguata (Duponchel, 1830)
- Charissa onustaria (Herrich-Schäffer, 1852)
- Charissa intermedia (Wehrli, 1917)
- Charissa supinaria (Mann, 1854)
- Charissa glaucinaria (Hübner, 1799)
- Chesias rufata (Fabricius, 1775)
- Chiasmia aestimaria (Hübner, 1809)
- Chiasmia clathrata (Linnaeus, 1758)
- Chlorissa cloraria (Hübner, 1813)
- Chlorissa viridata (Linnaeus, 1758)
- Chloroclysta siterata (Hufnagel, 1767)
- Chloroclystis v-ata (Haworth, 1809)
- Cidaria fulvata (Forster, 1771)
- Cleora cinctaria (Denis & Schiffermüller, 1775)
- Cleorodes lichenaria (Hufnagel, 1767)
- Cleta filacearia (Herrich-Schäffer, 1847)
- Coenotephria ablutaria (Boisduval, 1840)
- Coenotephria tophaceata (Denis & Schiffermüller, 1775)
- Colostygia aptata (Hübner, 1813)
- Colostygia aqueata (Hübner, 1813)
- Colostygia pectinataria (Knoch, 1781)
- Colostygia turbata (Hübner, 1799)
- Colostygia wolfschlaegerae (Pinker, 1953)
- Colotois pennaria (Linnaeus, 1761)
- Comibaena bajularia (Denis & Schiffermüller, 1775)
- Cosmorhoe ocellata (Linnaeus, 1758)
- Costaconvexa polygrammata (Borkhausen, 1794)
- Crocallis elinguaria (Linnaeus, 1758)
- Crocallis tusciaria (Borkhausen, 1793)
- Cyclophora linearia (Hübner, 1799)
- Cyclophora porata (Linnaeus, 1767)
- Cyclophora punctaria (Linnaeus, 1758)
- Cyclophora suppunctaria (Zeller, 1847)
- Cyclophora albiocellaria (Hübner, 1789)
- Cyclophora annularia (Fabricius, 1775)
- Cyclophora puppillaria (Hübner, 1799)
- Cyclophora quercimontaria (Bastelberger, 1897)
- Cyclophora ruficiliaria (Herrich-Schäffer, 1855)
- Dasycorsa modesta (Staudinger, 1879)
- Deileptenia ribeata (Clerck, 1759)
- Docirava dervenaria (von Mentzer, 1981)
- Dyscia innocentaria (Christoph, 1885)
- Dysstroma truncata (Hufnagel, 1767)
- Earophila badiata (Denis & Schiffermüller, 1775)
- Ectropis crepuscularia (Denis & Schiffermüller, 1775)
- Eilicrinia cordiaria (Hübner, 1790)
- Eilicrinia trinotata (Metzner, 1845)
- Ematurga atomaria (Linnaeus, 1758)
- Enanthyperythra legataria (Herrich-Schäffer, 1852)
- Ennomos alniaria (Linnaeus, 1758)
- Ennomos autumnaria (Werneburg, 1859)
- Ennomos erosaria (Denis & Schiffermüller, 1775)
- Ennomos fuscantaria (Haworth, 1809)
- Ennomos quercaria (Hübner, 1813)
- Ennomos quercinaria (Hufnagel, 1767)
- Entephria caesiata (Denis & Schiffermüller, 1775)
- Entephria cyanata (Hübner, 1809)
- Entephria flavicinctata (Hübner, 1813)
- Entephria nobiliaria (Herrich-Schäffer, 1852)
- Epione repandaria (Hufnagel, 1767)
- Epirrhoe alternata (Muller, 1764)
- Epirrhoe galiata (Denis & Schiffermüller, 1775)
- Epirrhoe molluginata (Hübner, 1813)
- Epirrhoe rivata (Hübner, 1813)
- Epirrhoe tristata (Linnaeus, 1758)
- Epirrita dilutata (Denis & Schiffermüller, 1775)
- Epirrita terminassianae Vardikian, 1974
- Eucrostes indigenata (de Villers, 1789)
- Eulithis populata (Linnaeus, 1758)
- Eulithis prunata (Linnaeus, 1758)
- Eumannia oppositaria (Mann, 1864)
- Eumera regina Staudinger, 1892
- Euphyia frustata (Treitschke, 1828)
- Euphyia mesembrina (Rebel, 1927)
- Eupithecia abbreviata Stephens, 1831
- Eupithecia addictata Dietze, 1908
- Eupithecia alliaria Staudinger, 1870
- Eupithecia breviculata (Donzel, 1837)
- Eupithecia carpophagata Staudinger, 1871
- Eupithecia centaureata (Denis & Schiffermüller, 1775)
- Eupithecia cocciferata Milliere, 1864
- Eupithecia cretaceata (Packard, 1874)
- Eupithecia cuculliaria (Rebel, 1901)
- Eupithecia denotata (Hübner, 1813)
- Eupithecia distinctaria Herrich-Schäffer, 1848
- Eupithecia dodoneata Guenee, 1858
- Eupithecia druentiata Dietze, 1902
- Eupithecia ericeata (Rambur, 1833)
- Eupithecia extraversaria Herrich-Schäffer, 1852
- Eupithecia extremata (Fabricius, 1787)
- Eupithecia fuscicostata Christoph, 1887
- Eupithecia gemellata Herrich-Schäffer, 1861
- Eupithecia graphata (Treitschke, 1828)
- Eupithecia gueneata Milliere, 1862
- Eupithecia haworthiata Doubleday, 1856
- Eupithecia icterata (de Villers, 1789)
- Eupithecia impurata (Hübner, 1813)
- Eupithecia innotata (Hufnagel, 1767)
- Eupithecia insigniata (Hübner, 1790)
- Eupithecia intricata (Zetterstedt, 1839)
- Eupithecia irriguata (Hübner, 1813)
- Eupithecia lanceata (Hübner, 1825)
- Eupithecia laquaearia Herrich-Schäffer, 1848
- Eupithecia lariciata (Freyer, 1841)
- Eupithecia limbata Staudinger, 1879
- Eupithecia linariata (Denis & Schiffermüller, 1775)
- Eupithecia mystica Dietze, 1910
- Eupithecia ochridata Schutze & Pinker, 1968
- Eupithecia orphnata W. Petersen, 1909
- Eupithecia pusillata (Denis & Schiffermüller, 1775)
- Eupithecia pyreneata Mabille, 1871
- Eupithecia quercetica Prout, 1938
- Eupithecia satyrata (Hübner, 1813)
- Eupithecia schiefereri Bohatsch, 1893
- Eupithecia semigraphata Bruand, 1850
- Eupithecia silenicolata Mabille, 1867
- Eupithecia spissilineata (Metzner, 1846)
- Eupithecia subfuscata (Haworth, 1809)
- Eupithecia tenuiata (Hübner, 1813)
- Eupithecia thurnerata Schutze, 1958
- Eupithecia tripunctaria Herrich-Schäffer, 1852
- Eupithecia trisignaria Herrich-Schäffer, 1848
- Eupithecia undata (Freyer, 1840)
- Eupithecia venosata (Fabricius, 1787)
- Eupithecia veratraria Herrich-Schäffer, 1848
- Eupithecia vulgata (Haworth, 1809)
- Fagivorina arenaria (Hufnagel, 1767)
- Gandaritis pyraliata (Denis & Schiffermüller, 1775)
- Geometra papilionaria (Linnaeus, 1758)
- Glacies canaliculata (Hochenwarth, 1785)
- Gnopharmia stevenaria (Boisduval, 1840)
- Gnophos sartata Treitschke, 1827
- Gnophos furvata (Denis & Schiffermüller, 1775)
- Gnophos obfuscata (Denis & Schiffermüller, 1775)
- Gnophos dumetata Treitschke, 1827
- Gymnoscelis rufifasciata (Haworth, 1809)
- Heliomata glarearia (Denis & Schiffermüller, 1775)
- Hemistola chrysoprasaria (Esper, 1795)
- Hemithea aestivaria (Hübner, 1789)
- Holoterpna pruinosata (Staudinger, 1897)
- Horisme aemulata (Hübner, 1813)
- Horisme calligraphata (Herrich-Schäffer, 1838)
- Horisme corticata (Treitschke, 1835)
- Horisme tersata (Denis & Schiffermüller, 1775)
- Horisme vitalbata (Denis & Schiffermüller, 1775)
- Hydrelia flammeolaria (Hufnagel, 1767)
- Hydrelia sylvata (Denis & Schiffermüller, 1775)
- Hydriomena furcata (Thunberg, 1784)
- Hylaea fasciaria (Linnaeus, 1758)
- Hypomecis punctinalis (Scopoli, 1763)
- Hypomecis roboraria (Denis & Schiffermüller, 1775)
- Hypoxystis pluviaria (Fabricius, 1787)
- Idaea albitorquata (Pungeler, 1909)
- Idaea aureolaria (Denis & Schiffermüller, 1775)
- Idaea aversata (Linnaeus, 1758)
- Idaea biselata (Hufnagel, 1767)
- Idaea camparia (Herrich-Schäffer, 1852)
- Idaea circuitaria (Hübner, 1819)
- Idaea consanguinaria (Lederer, 1853)
- Idaea consolidata (Lederer, 1853)
- Idaea contiguaria (Hübner, 1799)
- Idaea degeneraria (Hübner, 1799)
- Idaea determinata (Staudinger, 1876)
- Idaea deversaria (Herrich-Schäffer, 1847)
- Idaea dilutaria (Hübner, 1799)
- Idaea dimidiata (Hufnagel, 1767)
- Idaea distinctaria (Boisduval, 1840)
- Idaea elongaria (Rambur, 1833)
- Idaea filicata (Hübner, 1799)
- Idaea fuscovenosa (Goeze, 1781)
- Idaea humiliata (Hufnagel, 1767)
- Idaea inquinata (Scopoli, 1763)
- Idaea laevigata (Scopoli, 1763)
- Idaea metohiensis (Rebel, 1900)
- Idaea moniliata (Denis & Schiffermüller, 1775)
- Idaea obsoletaria (Rambur, 1833)
- Idaea ochrata (Scopoli, 1763)
- Idaea ossiculata (Lederer, 1870)
- Idaea ostrinaria (Hübner, 1813)
- Idaea pallidata (Denis & Schiffermüller, 1775)
- Idaea politaria (Hübner, 1799)
- Idaea rubraria (Staudinger, 1901)
- Idaea rufaria (Hübner, 1799)
- Idaea rusticata (Denis & Schiffermüller, 1775)
- Idaea seriata (Schrank, 1802)
- Idaea serpentata (Hufnagel, 1767)
- Idaea straminata (Borkhausen, 1794)
- Idaea subsericeata (Haworth, 1809)
- Idaea trigeminata (Haworth, 1809)
- Isturgia arenacearia (Denis & Schiffermüller, 1775)
- Isturgia roraria (Fabricius, 1776)
- Larentia clavaria (Haworth, 1809)
- Ligdia adustata (Denis & Schiffermüller, 1775)
- Lithostege farinata (Hufnagel, 1767)
- Lithostege griseata (Denis & Schiffermüller, 1775)
- Lobophora halterata (Hufnagel, 1767)
- Lomaspilis marginata (Linnaeus, 1758)
- Lomographa bimaculata (Fabricius, 1775)
- Lomographa temerata (Denis & Schiffermüller, 1775)
- Lycia graecarius (Staudinger, 1861)
- Lycia hirtaria (Clerck, 1759)
- Lythria cruentaria (Hufnagel, 1767)
- Lythria purpuraria (Linnaeus, 1758)
- Macaria fusca (Thunberg, 1792)
- Melanthia procellata (Denis & Schiffermüller, 1775)
- Menophra abruptaria (Thunberg, 1792)
- Mesoleuca albicillata (Linnaeus, 1758)
- Mesotype verberata (Scopoli, 1763)
- Microloxia herbaria (Hübner, 1813)
- Minoa murinata (Scopoli, 1763)
- Nebula achromaria (de La Harpe, 1853)
- Nebula nebulata (Treitschke, 1828)
- Nebula senectaria (Herrich-Schäffer, 1852)
- Nychiodes amygdalaria (Herrich-Schäffer, 1848)
- Nychiodes dalmatina Wagner, 1909
- Nycterosea obstipata (Fabricius, 1794)
- Odezia atrata (Linnaeus, 1758)
- Operophtera brumata (Linnaeus, 1758)
- Opisthograptis luteolata (Linnaeus, 1758)
- Orthostixis cribraria (Hübner, 1799)
- Oulobophora internata (Pungeler, 1888)
- Ourapteryx sambucaria (Linnaeus, 1758)
- Paradarisa consonaria (Hübner, 1799)
- Parectropis similaria (Hufnagel, 1767)
- Pasiphila rectangulata (Linnaeus, 1758)
- Pelurga comitata (Linnaeus, 1758)
- Pennithera firmata (Hübner, 1822)
- Pennithera ulicata (Rambur, 1934)
- Perconia strigillaria (Hübner, 1787)
- Peribatodes correptaria (Zeller, 1847)
- Peribatodes rhomboidaria (Denis & Schiffermüller, 1775)
- Peribatodes secundaria (Denis & Schiffermüller, 1775)
- Peribatodes umbraria (Hübner, 1809)
- Perizoma affinitata (Stephens, 1831)
- Perizoma albulata (Denis & Schiffermüller, 1775)
- Perizoma alchemillata (Linnaeus, 1758)
- Perizoma blandiata (Denis & Schiffermüller, 1775)
- Perizoma flavofasciata (Thunberg, 1792)
- Perizoma flavosparsata (Wagner, 1926)
- Perizoma hydrata (Treitschke, 1829)
- Perizoma incultaria (Herrich-Schäffer, 1848)
- Perizoma minorata (Treitschke, 1828)
- Perizoma obsoletata (Herrich-Schäffer, 1838)
- Phaiogramma etruscaria (Zeller, 1849)
- Phibalapteryx virgata (Hufnagel, 1767)
- Phigalia pilosaria (Denis & Schiffermüller, 1775)
- Philereme vetulata (Denis & Schiffermüller, 1775)
- Proteuchloris neriaria (Herrich-Schäffer, 1852)
- Protorhoe corollaria (Herrich-Schäffer, 1848)
- Protorhoe unicata (Guenee, 1858)
- Pseudobaptria bogumilaria (Rebel, 1904)
- Pseudopanthera macularia (Linnaeus, 1758)
- Pseudoterpna pruinata (Hufnagel, 1767)
- Pungeleria capreolaria (Denis & Schiffermüller, 1775)
- Rhodometra sacraria (Linnaeus, 1767)
- Rhodostrophia badiaria (Freyer, 1841)
- Rhodostrophia calabra (Petagna, 1786)
- Rhodostrophia discopunctata Amsel, 1935
- Rhodostrophia vibicaria (Clerck, 1759)
- Schistostege decussata (Denis & Schiffermüller, 1775)
- Scopula beckeraria (Lederer, 1853)
- Scopula confinaria (Herrich-Schäffer, 1847)
- Scopula flaccidaria (Zeller, 1852)
- Scopula imitaria (Hübner, 1799)
- Scopula immutata (Linnaeus, 1758)
- Scopula incanata (Linnaeus, 1758)
- Scopula marginepunctata (Goeze, 1781)
- Scopula decorata (Denis & Schiffermüller, 1775)
- Scopula immorata (Linnaeus, 1758)
- Scopula nigropunctata (Hufnagel, 1767)
- Scopula ochraceata (Staudinger, 1901)
- Scopula orientalis (Alphéraky, 1876)
- Scopula ornata (Scopoli, 1763)
- Scopula rubiginata (Hufnagel, 1767)
- Scopula submutata (Treitschke, 1828)
- Scopula tessellaria (Boisduval, 1840)
- Scopula turbulentaria (Staudinger, 1870)
- Scotopteryx bipunctaria (Denis & Schiffermüller, 1775)
- Scotopteryx chenopodiata (Linnaeus, 1758)
- Scotopteryx coarctaria (Denis & Schiffermüller, 1775)
- Scotopteryx ignorata Huemer & Hausmann, 1998
- Scotopteryx luridata (Hufnagel, 1767)
- Scotopteryx moeniata (Scopoli, 1763)
- Scotopteryx mucronata (Scopoli, 1763)
- Scotopteryx vicinaria (Duponchel, 1830)
- Selenia dentaria (Fabricius, 1775)
- Selenia lunularia (Hübner, 1788)
- Selenia tetralunaria (Hufnagel, 1767)
- Selidosema plumaria (Denis & Schiffermüller, 1775)
- Siona lineata (Scopoli, 1763)
- Stegania dilectaria (Hübner, 1790)
- Synopsia sociaria (Hübner, 1799)
- Tephronia sepiaria (Hufnagel, 1767)
- Thalera fimbrialis (Scopoli, 1763)
- Thera cognata (Thunberg, 1792)
- Thera juniperata (Linnaeus, 1758)
- Thera variata (Denis & Schiffermüller, 1775)
- Thera vetustata (Denis & Schiffermüller, 1775)
- Thetidia smaragdaria (Fabricius, 1787)
- Timandra comae Schmidt, 1931
- Triphosa dubitata (Linnaeus, 1758)
- Triphosa sabaudiata (Duponchel, 1830)
- Xanthorhoe designata (Hufnagel, 1767)
- Xanthorhoe ferrugata (Clerck, 1759)
- Xanthorhoe fluctuata (Linnaeus, 1758)
- Xanthorhoe montanata (Denis & Schiffermüller, 1775)
- Xanthorhoe oxybiata (Milliere, 1872)
- Xanthorhoe quadrifasiata (Clerck, 1759)
- Xanthorhoe spadicearia (Denis & Schiffermüller, 1775)

=== Glyphipterigidae ===
- Digitivalva heringi (Klimesch, 1956)
- Digitivalva granitella (Treitschke, 1833)
- Digitivalva macedonica (Klimesch, 1956)
- Digitivalva orientella (Klimesch, 1956)
- Digitivalva pulicariae (Klimesch, 1956)
- Digitivalva wolfschlaegeri (Klimesch, 1956)

=== Gracillariidae ===
- Acrocercops brongniardella (Fabricius, 1798)
- Aspilapteryx limosella (Duponchel, 1843)
- Aspilapteryx tringipennella (Zeller, 1839)
- Caloptilia alchimiella (Scopoli, 1763)
- Caloptilia fidella (Reutti, 1853)
- Caloptilia fribergensis (Fritzsche, 1871)
- Caloptilia honoratella (Rebel, 1914)
- Caloptilia stigmatella (Fabricius, 1781)
- Cameraria ohridella Deschka & Dimic, 1986
- Cupedia cupediella (Herrich-Schäffer, 1855)
- Euspilapteryx auroguttella Stephens, 1835
- Parornix acuta Triberti, 1980
- Parornix anglicella (Stainton, 1850)
- Parornix anguliferella (Zeller, 1847)
- Parornix carpinella (Frey, 1863)
- Parornix fagivora (Frey, 1861)
- Parornix torquillella (Zeller, 1850)
- Phyllocnistis saligna (Zeller, 1839)
- Phyllonorycter abrasella (Duponchel, 1843)
- Phyllonorycter corylifoliella (Hübner, 1796)
- Phyllonorycter delitella (Duponchel, 1843)
- Phyllonorycter esperella (Goeze, 1783)
- Phyllonorycter fiumella (Krone, 1910)
- Phyllonorycter froelichiella (Zeller, 1839)
- Phyllonorycter helianthemella (Herrich-Schäffer, 1861)
- Phyllonorycter hostis Triberti, 2007
- Phyllonorycter kuhlweiniella (Zeller, 1839)
- Phyllonorycter macedonica (Deschka, 1971)
- Phyllonorycter maestingella (Muller, 1764)
- Phyllonorycter messaniella (Zeller, 1846)
- Phyllonorycter millierella (Staudinger, 1871)
- Phyllonorycter parisiella (Wocke, 1848)
- Phyllonorycter pastorella (Zeller, 1846)
- Phyllonorycter platani (Staudinger, 1870)
- Phyllonorycter populifoliella (Treitschke, 1833)
- Phyllonorycter quercifoliella (Zeller, 1839)
- Phyllonorycter scitulella (Duponchel, 1843)
- Phyllonorycter trifasciella (Haworth, 1828)
- Phyllonorycter trojana Deschka, 1982
- Phyllonorycter turanica (Gerasimov, 1931)

=== Heliozelidae ===
- Antispila treitschkiella (Fischer von Röslerstamm, 1843)

=== Hepialidae ===
- Hepialus humuli (Linnaeus, 1758)
- Pharmacis fusconebulosa (DeGeer, 1778)
- Pharmacis lupulina (Linnaeus, 1758)
- Triodia adriaticus (Osthelder, 1931)
- Triodia amasinus (Herrich-Schäffer, 1851)
- Triodia sylvina (Linnaeus, 1761)

=== Heterogynidae ===
- Heterogynis penella (Hübner, 1819)

=== Incurvariidae ===
- Incurvaria masculella (Denis & Schiffermüller, 1775)
- Incurvaria pectinea Haworth, 1828

=== Lasiocampidae ===
- Cosmotriche lobulina (Denis & Schiffermüller, 1775)
- Dendrolimus pini (Linnaeus, 1758)
- Eriogaster catax (Linnaeus, 1758)
- Eriogaster lanestris (Linnaeus, 1758)
- Eriogaster rimicola (Denis & Schiffermüller, 1775)
- Gastropacha quercifolia (Linnaeus, 1758)
- Gastropacha populifolia (Denis & Schiffermüller, 1775)
- Lasiocampa quercus (Linnaeus, 1758)
- Lasiocampa grandis (Rogenhofer, 1891)
- Lasiocampa trifolii (Denis & Schiffermüller, 1775)
- Macrothylacia rubi (Linnaeus, 1758)
- Malacosoma castrensis (Linnaeus, 1758)
- Malacosoma neustria (Linnaeus, 1758)
- Malacosoma franconica (Denis & Schiffermüller, 1775)
- Odonestis pruni (Linnaeus, 1758)
- Pachypasa otus (Drury, 1773)
- Phyllodesma tremulifolia (Hübner, 1810)
- Trichiura castiliana Spuler, 1908
- Trichiura crataegi (Linnaeus, 1758)
- Trichiura verenae Witt, 1981

=== Lecithoceridae ===
- Homaloxestis briantiella (Turati, 1879)

=== Limacodidae ===
- Apoda limacodes (Hufnagel, 1766)
- Heterogenea asella (Denis & Schiffermüller, 1775)

=== Lyonetiidae ===
- Leucoptera aceris (Fuchs, 1903)
- Leucoptera heringiella Toll, 1938
- Leucoptera laburnella (Stainton, 1851)
- Leucoptera malifoliella (O. Costa, 1836)
- Lyonetia clerkella (Linnaeus, 1758)
- Lyonetia prunifoliella (Hübner, 1796)

=== Lypusidae ===
- Pseudatemelia josephinae (Toll, 1956)

=== Micropterigidae ===
- Micropterix corcyrella Walsingham, 1919
- Micropterix kardamylensis Rebel, 1903
- Micropterix myrtetella Zeller, 1850
- Micropterix tunbergella (Fabricius, 1787)

=== Millieridae ===
- Millieria dolosalis (Heydenreich, 1851)

=== Momphidae ===
- Mompha miscella (Denis & Schiffermüller, 1775)
- Mompha propinquella (Stainton, 1851)

=== Nepticulidae ===
- Acalyptris platani (Muller-Rutz, 1934)
- Ectoedemia caradjai (Groschke, 1944)
- Ectoedemia gilvipennella (Klimesch, 1946)
- Ectoedemia rufifrontella (Caradja, 1920)
- Ectoedemia decentella (Herrich-Schäffer, 1855)
- Ectoedemia eriki A. & Z. Lastuvka, 2000
- Ectoedemia amani Svensson, 1966
- Ectoedemia longicaudella Klimesch, 1953
- Stigmella anomalella (Goeze, 1783)
- Stigmella atricapitella (Haworth, 1828)
- Stigmella crataegella (Klimesch, 1936)
- Stigmella eberhardi (Johansson, 1971)
- Stigmella johanssonella A. & Z. Lastuvka, 1997
- Stigmella lonicerarum (Frey, 1856)
- Stigmella microtheriella (Stainton, 1854)
- Stigmella minusculella (Herrich-Schäffer, 1855)
- Stigmella paliurella Gerasimov, 1937
- Stigmella paradoxa (Frey, 1858)
- Stigmella plagicolella (Stainton, 1854)
- Stigmella prunetorum (Stainton, 1855)
- Stigmella regiella (Herrich-Schäffer, 1855)
- Stigmella roborella (Johansson, 1971)
- Stigmella speciosa (Frey, 1858)
- Stigmella tityrella (Stainton, 1854)
- Stigmella trimaculella (Haworth, 1828)
- Trifurcula bleonella (Chretien, 1904)
- Trifurcula globulariae Klimesch, 1975
- Trifurcula cryptella (Stainton, 1856)
- Trifurcula eurema (Tutt, 1899)
- Trifurcula calycotomella A. & Z. Lastuvka, 1997
- Trifurcula macedonica Z. & A. Lastuvka, 1998
- Trifurcula orientella Klimesch, 1953
- Trifurcula pallidella (Duponchel, 1843)

=== Noctuidae ===
- Abrostola agnorista Dufay, 1956
- Abrostola asclepiadis (Denis & Schiffermüller, 1775)
- Abrostola tripartita (Hufnagel, 1766)
- Abrostola triplasia (Linnaeus, 1758)
- Acontia lucida (Hufnagel, 1766)
- Acontia trabealis (Scopoli, 1763)
- Acontia melanura (Tauscher, 1809)
- Acontiola moldavicola (Herrich-Schäffer, 1851)
- Acosmetia caliginosa (Hübner, 1813)
- Acronicta aceris (Linnaeus, 1758)
- Acronicta leporina (Linnaeus, 1758)
- Acronicta strigosa (Denis & Schiffermüller, 1775)
- Acronicta alni (Linnaeus, 1767)
- Acronicta cuspis (Hübner, 1813)
- Acronicta psi (Linnaeus, 1758)
- Acronicta tridens (Denis & Schiffermüller, 1775)
- Acronicta auricoma (Denis & Schiffermüller, 1775)
- Acronicta euphorbiae (Denis & Schiffermüller, 1775)
- Acronicta orientalis (Mann, 1862)
- Acronicta rumicis (Linnaeus, 1758)
- Actebia praecox (Linnaeus, 1758)
- Actinotia polyodon (Clerck, 1759)
- Actinotia radiosa (Esper, 1804)
- Aedia funesta (Esper, 1786)
- Aedia leucomelas (Linnaeus, 1758)
- Aegle kaekeritziana (Hübner, 1799)
- Aegle semicana (Esper, 1798)
- Agrochola lychnidis (Denis & Schiffermüller, 1775)
- Agrochola lactiflora Draudt, 1934
- Agrochola helvola (Linnaeus, 1758)
- Agrochola humilis (Denis & Schiffermüller, 1775)
- Agrochola kindermannii (Fischer v. Röslerstamm, 1837)
- Agrochola litura (Linnaeus, 1758)
- Agrochola nitida (Denis & Schiffermüller, 1775)
- Agrochola thurneri Boursin, 1953
- Agrochola lota (Clerck, 1759)
- Agrochola macilenta (Hübner, 1809)
- Agrochola laevis (Hübner, 1803)
- Agrotis bigramma (Esper, 1790)
- Agrotis cinerea (Denis & Schiffermüller, 1775)
- Agrotis clavis (Hufnagel, 1766)
- Agrotis exclamationis (Linnaeus, 1758)
- Agrotis ipsilon (Hufnagel, 1766)
- Agrotis obesa Boisduval, 1829
- Agrotis puta (Hübner, 1803)
- Agrotis segetum (Denis & Schiffermüller, 1775)
- Agrotis spinifera (Hübner, 1808)
- Agrotis trux (Hübner, 1824)
- Allophyes oxyacanthae (Linnaeus, 1758)
- Amephana dalmatica (Rebel, 1919)
- Ammoconia caecimacula (Denis & Schiffermüller, 1775)
- Ammoconia senex (Geyer, 1828)
- Amphipoea fucosa (Freyer, 1830)
- Amphipoea oculea (Linnaeus, 1761)
- Amphipyra berbera Rungs, 1949
- Amphipyra effusa Boisduval, 1828
- Amphipyra livida (Denis & Schiffermüller, 1775)
- Amphipyra micans Lederer, 1857
- Amphipyra perflua (Fabricius, 1787)
- Amphipyra pyramidea (Linnaeus, 1758)
- Amphipyra stix Herrich-Schäffer, 1850
- Amphipyra tetra (Fabricius, 1787)
- Amphipyra tragopoginis (Clerck, 1759)
- Amphipyra cinnamomea (Goeze, 1781)
- Anaplectoides prasina (Denis & Schiffermüller, 1775)
- Anarta dianthi (Tauscher, 1809)
- Anarta melanopa (Thunberg, 1791)
- Anarta mendax (Staudinger, 1879)
- Anarta odontites (Boisduval, 1829)
- Anarta trifolii (Hufnagel, 1766)
- Anorthoa munda (Denis & Schiffermüller, 1775)
- Anthracia eriopoda (Herrich-Schäffer, 1851)
- Antitype chi (Linnaeus, 1758)
- Antitype jonis (Lederer, 1865)
- Antitype suda (Geyer, 1832)
- Apamea anceps (Denis & Schiffermüller, 1775)
- Apamea aquila Donzel, 1837
- Apamea crenata (Hufnagel, 1766)
- Apamea epomidion (Haworth, 1809)
- Apamea furva (Denis & Schiffermüller, 1775)
- Apamea illyria Freyer, 1846
- Apamea lateritia (Hufnagel, 1766)
- Apamea lithoxylaea (Denis & Schiffermüller, 1775)
- Apamea maillardi (Geyer, 1834)
- Apamea michielii Varga, 1976
- Apamea monoglypha (Hufnagel, 1766)
- Apamea oblonga (Haworth, 1809)
- Apamea platinea (Treitschke, 1825)
- Apamea remissa (Hübner, 1809)
- Apamea rubrirena (Treitschke, 1825)
- Apamea scolopacina (Esper, 1788)
- Apamea sordens (Hufnagel, 1766)
- Apamea sublustris (Esper, 1788)
- Apamea syriaca (Osthelder, 1933)
- Apamea unanimis (Hübner, 1813)
- Apamea zeta (Treitschke, 1825)
- Apaustis rupicola (Denis & Schiffermüller, 1775)
- Aporophyla australis (Boisduval, 1829)
- Aporophyla canescens (Duponchel, 1826)
- Aporophyla lutulenta (Denis & Schiffermüller, 1775)
- Aporophyla nigra (Haworth, 1809)
- Apterogenum ypsillon (Denis & Schiffermüller, 1775)
- Archanara neurica (Hübner, 1808)
- Asteroscopus sphinx (Hufnagel, 1766)
- Asteroscopus syriaca (Warren, 1910)
- Atethmia ambusta (Denis & Schiffermüller, 1775)
- Atethmia centrago (Haworth, 1809)
- Athetis furvula (Hübner, 1808)
- Athetis gluteosa (Treitschke, 1835)
- Athetis pallustris (Hübner, 1808)
- Athetis lepigone (Moschler, 1860)
- Atypha pulmonaris (Esper, 1790)
- Auchmis detersa (Esper, 1787)
- Autographa gamma (Linnaeus, 1758)
- Autographa jota (Linnaeus, 1758)
- Autographa pulchrina (Haworth, 1809)
- Axylia putris (Linnaeus, 1761)
- Behounekia freyeri (Frivaldszky, 1835)
- Brachionycha nubeculosa (Esper, 1785)
- Brachylomia viminalis (Fabricius, 1776)
- Bryophila ereptricula Treitschke, 1825
- Bryophila orthogramma (Boursin, 1954)
- Bryophila raptricula (Denis & Schiffermüller, 1775)
- Bryophila ravula (Hübner, 1813)
- Bryophila rectilinea (Warren, 1909)
- Bryophila seladona Christoph, 1885
- Bryophila tephrocharis (Boursin, 1953)
- Bryophila domestica (Hufnagel, 1766)
- Calamia tridens (Hufnagel, 1766)
- Calliergis ramosa (Esper, 1786)
- Callopistria juventina (Stoll, 1782)
- Callopistria latreillei (Duponchel, 1827)
- Calophasia lunula (Hufnagel, 1766)
- Calophasia opalina (Esper, 1793)
- Calophasia platyptera (Esper, 1788)
- Caradrina morpheus (Hufnagel, 1766)
- Caradrina gilva (Donzel, 1837)
- Caradrina abruzzensis (Draudt, 1933)
- Caradrina clavipalpis Scopoli, 1763
- Caradrina flavirena Guenee, 1852
- Caradrina selini Boisduval, 1840
- Caradrina suscianja (Mentzer, 1981)
- Caradrina wullschlegeli Pungeler, 1903
- Caradrina aspersa Rambur, 1834
- Caradrina kadenii Freyer, 1836
- Caradrina terrea Freyer, 1840
- Ceramica pisi (Linnaeus, 1758)
- Cerapteryx graminis (Linnaeus, 1758)
- Cerastis leucographa (Denis & Schiffermüller, 1775)
- Cerastis rubricosa (Denis & Schiffermüller, 1775)
- Charanyca trigrammica (Hufnagel, 1766)
- Charanyca apfelbecki (Rebel, 1901)
- Charanyca ferruginea (Esper, 1785)
- Chersotis cuprea (Denis & Schiffermüller, 1775)
- Chersotis fimbriola (Esper, 1803)
- Chersotis laeta (Rebel, 1904)
- Chersotis margaritacea (Villers, 1789)
- Chersotis multangula (Hübner, 1803)
- Chilodes maritima (Tauscher, 1806)
- Chloantha hyperici (Denis & Schiffermüller, 1775)
- Chrysodeixis chalcites (Esper, 1789)
- Cleoceris scoriacea (Esper, 1789)
- Cleonymia opposita (Lederer, 1870)
- Colocasia coryli (Linnaeus, 1758)
- Condica viscosa (Freyer, 1831)
- Conisania luteago (Denis & Schiffermüller, 1775)
- Conistra ligula (Esper, 1791)
- Conistra rubiginosa (Scopoli, 1763)
- Conistra vaccinii (Linnaeus, 1761)
- Conistra veronicae (Hübner, 1813)
- Conistra erythrocephala (Denis & Schiffermüller, 1775)
- Conistra rubiginea (Denis & Schiffermüller, 1775)
- Conistra ragusae (Failla-Tedaldi, 1890)
- Conistra torrida (Lederer, 1857)
- Coranarta cordigera (Thunberg, 1788)
- Cosmia trapezina (Linnaeus, 1758)
- Cosmia pyralina (Denis & Schiffermüller, 1775)
- Cosmia confinis Herrich-Schäffer, 1849
- Cosmia affinis (Linnaeus, 1767)
- Craniophora ligustri (Denis & Schiffermüller, 1775)
- Craniophora pontica (Staudinger, 1878)
- Cryphia fraudatricula (Hübner, 1803)
- Cryphia receptricula (Hübner, 1803)
- Cryphia algae (Fabricius, 1775)
- Cryphia ochsi (Boursin, 1940)
- Crypsedra gemmea (Treitschke, 1825)
- Cucullia celsiae Herrich-Schäffer, 1850
- Cucullia absinthii (Linnaeus, 1761)
- Cucullia argentea (Hufnagel, 1766)
- Cucullia artemisiae (Hufnagel, 1766)
- Cucullia asteris (Denis & Schiffermüller, 1775)
- Cucullia balsamitae Boisduval, 1840
- Cucullia campanulae Freyer, 1831
- Cucullia chamomillae (Denis & Schiffermüller, 1775)
- Cucullia formosa Rogenhofer, 1860
- Cucullia fraudatrix Eversmann, 1837
- Cucullia lactucae (Denis & Schiffermüller, 1775)
- Cucullia lucifuga (Denis & Schiffermüller, 1775)
- Cucullia santonici (Hübner, 1813)
- Cucullia scopariae Dorfmeister, 1853
- Cucullia tanaceti (Denis & Schiffermüller, 1775)
- Cucullia umbratica (Linnaeus, 1758)
- Cucullia xeranthemi Boisduval, 1840
- Cucullia blattariae (Esper, 1790)
- Cucullia lanceolata (Villers, 1789)
- Cucullia lychnitis Rambur, 1833
- Cucullia prenanthis Boisduval, 1840
- Cucullia scrophulariae (Denis & Schiffermüller, 1775)
- Cucullia verbasci (Linnaeus, 1758)
- Dasypolia ferdinandi Ruhl, 1892
- Dasypolia templi (Thunberg, 1792)
- Deltote bankiana (Fabricius, 1775)
- Deltote deceptoria (Scopoli, 1763)
- Deltote uncula (Clerck, 1759)
- Deltote pygarga (Hufnagel, 1766)
- Denticucullus pygmina (Haworth, 1809)
- Diachrysia chrysitis (Linnaeus, 1758)
- Diachrysia chryson (Esper, 1789)
- Diachrysia nadeja (Oberthur, 1880)
- Diachrysia zosimi (Hübner, 1822)
- Diarsia mendica (Fabricius, 1775)
- Diarsia rubi (Vieweg, 1790)
- Dichagyris flammatra (Denis & Schiffermüller, 1775)
- Dichagyris candelisequa (Denis & Schiffermüller, 1775)
- Dichagyris flavina (Herrich-Schäffer, 1852)
- Dichagyris forcipula (Denis & Schiffermüller, 1775)
- Dichagyris nigrescens (Hofner, 1888)
- Dichagyris orientis (Alphéraky, 1882)
- Dichagyris renigera (Hübner, 1808)
- Dichagyris signifera (Denis & Schiffermüller, 1775)
- Dichonia aeruginea (Hübner, 1808)
- Dichonia convergens (Denis & Schiffermüller, 1775)
- Dicycla oo (Linnaeus, 1758)
- Diloba caeruleocephala (Linnaeus, 1758)
- Dioszeghyana schmidti (Dioszeghy, 1935)
- Divaena haywardi (Tams, 1926)
- Dryobota labecula (Esper, 1788)
- Dryobotodes tenebrosa (Esper, 1789)
- Dryobotodes carbonis Wagner, 1931
- Dryobotodes eremita (Fabricius, 1775)
- Dryobotodes monochroma (Esper, 1790)
- Dypterygia scabriuscula (Linnaeus, 1758)
- Egira conspicillaris (Linnaeus, 1758)
- Elaphria venustula (Hübner, 1790)
- Enargia abluta (Hübner, 1808)
- Enterpia laudeti (Boisduval, 1840)
- Epilecta linogrisea (Denis & Schiffermüller, 1775)
- Epimecia ustula (Freyer, 1835)
- Epipsilia grisescens (Fabricius, 1794)
- Episema glaucina (Esper, 1789)
- Episema korsakovi (Christoph, 1885)
- Episema lederi Christoph, 1885
- Episema tersa (Denis & Schiffermüller, 1775)
- Eremobia ochroleuca (Denis & Schiffermüller, 1775)
- Eucarta amethystina (Hübner, 1803)
- Eucarta virgo (Treitschke, 1835)
- Euchalcia consona (Fabricius, 1787)
- Euchalcia modestoides Poole, 1989
- Eugnorisma depuncta (Linnaeus, 1761)
- Eugnorisma pontica (Staudinger, 1892)
- Euplexia lucipara (Linnaeus, 1758)
- Eupsilia transversa (Hufnagel, 1766)
- Euxoa aquilina (Denis & Schiffermüller, 1775)
- Euxoa conspicua (Hübner, 1824)
- Euxoa cos (Hübner, 1824)
- Euxoa decora (Denis & Schiffermüller, 1775)
- Euxoa distinguenda (Lederer, 1857)
- Euxoa eruta (Hübner, 1817)
- Euxoa glabella Wagner, 1930
- Euxoa hastifera (Donzel, 1847)
- Euxoa nigricans (Linnaeus, 1761)
- Euxoa nigrofusca (Esper, 1788)
- Euxoa obelisca (Denis & Schiffermüller, 1775)
- Euxoa temera (Hübner, 1808)
- Euxoa vitta (Esper, 1789)
- Evisa schawerdae Reisser, 1930
- Globia algae (Esper, 1789)
- Gortyna borelii Pierret, 1837
- Gortyna flavago (Denis & Schiffermüller, 1775)
- Gortyna puengeleri (Turati, 1909)
- Graphiphora augur (Fabricius, 1775)
- Griposia aprilina (Linnaeus, 1758)
- Hada plebeja (Linnaeus, 1761)
- Hadena irregularis (Hufnagel, 1766)
- Hadena perplexa (Denis & Schiffermüller, 1775)
- Hadena silenes (Hübner, 1822)
- Hadena syriaca (Osthelder, 1933)
- Hadena adriana (Schawerda, 1921)
- Hadena albimacula (Borkhausen, 1792)
- Hadena caesia (Denis & Schiffermüller, 1775)
- Hadena capsincola (Denis & Schiffermüller, 1775)
- Hadena clara (Staudinger, 1901)
- Hadena compta (Denis & Schiffermüller, 1775)
- Hadena confusa (Hufnagel, 1766)
- Hadena drenowskii (Rebel, 1930)
- Hadena filograna (Esper, 1788)
- Hadena gueneei (Staudinger, 1901)
- Hadena luteocincta (Rambur, 1834)
- Hadena magnolii (Boisduval, 1829)
- Hadena perpetua Hacker, 1996
- Hadena vulcanica (Turati, 1907)
- Hadena wehrlii (Draudt, 1934)
- Haemerosia renalis (Hübner, 1813)
- Hecatera bicolorata (Hufnagel, 1766)
- Hecatera cappa (Hübner, 1809)
- Hecatera dysodea (Denis & Schiffermüller, 1775)
- Helicoverpa armigera (Hübner, 1808)
- Heliothis adaucta Butler, 1878
- Heliothis incarnata Freyer, 1838
- Heliothis maritima Graslin, 1855
- Heliothis nubigera Herrich-Schäffer, 1851
- Heliothis ononis (Denis & Schiffermüller, 1775)
- Heliothis peltigera (Denis & Schiffermüller, 1775)
- Heliothis viriplaca (Hufnagel, 1766)
- Helivictoria victorina (Sodoffsky, 1849)
- Hoplodrina ambigua (Denis & Schiffermüller, 1775)
- Hoplodrina blanda (Denis & Schiffermüller, 1775)
- Hoplodrina octogenaria (Goeze, 1781)
- Hoplodrina respersa (Denis & Schiffermüller, 1775)
- Hoplodrina superstes (Ochsenheimer, 1816)
- Hydraecia micacea (Esper, 1789)
- Hydraecia petasitis Doubleday, 1847
- Hyppa rectilinea (Esper, 1788)
- Ipimorpha retusa (Linnaeus, 1761)
- Ipimorpha subtusa (Denis & Schiffermüller, 1775)
- Janthinea friwaldskii (Duponchel, 1835)
- Jodia croceago (Denis & Schiffermüller, 1775)
- Lacanobia contigua (Denis & Schiffermüller, 1775)
- Lacanobia suasa (Denis & Schiffermüller, 1775)
- Lacanobia thalassina (Hufnagel, 1766)
- Lacanobia aliena (Hübner, 1809)
- Lacanobia blenna (Hübner, 1824)
- Lacanobia oleracea (Linnaeus, 1758)
- Lacanobia splendens (Hübner, 1808)
- Lacanobia w-latinum (Hufnagel, 1766)
- Lamprotes c-aureum (Knoch, 1781)
- Lasionycta proxima (Hübner, 1809)
- Lateroligia ophiogramma (Esper, 1794)
- Lenisa geminipuncta (Haworth, 1809)
- Leucania loreyi (Duponchel, 1827)
- Leucania comma (Linnaeus, 1761)
- Leucania obsoleta (Hübner, 1803)
- Leucania punctosa (Treitschke, 1825)
- Leucania putrescens (Hübner, 1824)
- Leucania zeae (Duponchel, 1827)
- Lithophane furcifera (Hufnagel, 1766)
- Lithophane ledereri (Staudinger, 1892)
- Lithophane merckii (Rambur, 1832)
- Lithophane ornitopus (Hufnagel, 1766)
- Lithophane semibrunnea (Haworth, 1809)
- Lithophane socia (Hufnagel, 1766)
- Lithophane lapidea (Hübner, 1808)
- Litoligia literosa (Haworth, 1809)
- Luperina dumerilii (Duponchel, 1826)
- Luperina nickerlii (Freyer, 1845)
- Luperina rubella (Duponchel, 1835)
- Luperina testacea (Denis & Schiffermüller, 1775)
- Macdunnoughia confusa (Stephens, 1850)
- Mamestra brassicae (Linnaeus, 1758)
- Maraschia grisescens Osthelder, 1933
- Meganephria bimaculosa (Linnaeus, 1767)
- Mesapamea secalella Remm, 1983
- Mesapamea secalis (Linnaeus, 1758)
- Mesogona acetosellae (Denis & Schiffermüller, 1775)
- Mesoligia furuncula (Denis & Schiffermüller, 1775)
- Mesotrosta signalis (Treitschke, 1829)
- Mniotype adusta (Esper, 1790)
- Mniotype satura (Denis & Schiffermüller, 1775)
- Mniotype solieri (Boisduval, 1829)
- Moma alpium (Osbeck, 1778)
- Mormo maura (Linnaeus, 1758)
- Mythimna riparia (Rambur, 1829)
- Mythimna albipuncta (Denis & Schiffermüller, 1775)
- Mythimna congrua (Hübner, 1817)
- Mythimna ferrago (Fabricius, 1787)
- Mythimna l-album (Linnaeus, 1767)
- Mythimna conigera (Denis & Schiffermüller, 1775)
- Mythimna impura (Hübner, 1808)
- Mythimna pallens (Linnaeus, 1758)
- Mythimna pudorina (Denis & Schiffermüller, 1775)
- Mythimna straminea (Treitschke, 1825)
- Mythimna turca (Linnaeus, 1761)
- Mythimna vitellina (Hübner, 1808)
- Mythimna alopecuri (Boisduval, 1840)
- Mythimna andereggii (Boisduval, 1840)
- Mythimna sicula (Treitschke, 1835)
- Naenia typica (Linnaeus, 1758)
- Noctua comes Hübner, 1813
- Noctua fimbriata (Schreber, 1759)
- Noctua interposita (Hübner, 1790)
- Noctua janthina Denis & Schiffermüller, 1775
- Noctua orbona (Hufnagel, 1766)
- Noctua pronuba (Linnaeus, 1758)
- Noctua tirrenica Biebinger, Speidel & Hanigk, 1983
- Nyctobrya amasina Draudt, 1931
- Nyctobrya muralis (Forster, 1771)
- Ochropleura leucogaster (Freyer, 1831)
- Ochropleura plecta (Linnaeus, 1761)
- Oligia fasciuncula (Haworth, 1809)
- Oligia latruncula (Denis & Schiffermüller, 1775)
- Oligia strigilis (Linnaeus, 1758)
- Oligia versicolor (Borkhausen, 1792)
- Olivenebula subsericata (Herrich-Schäffer, 1861)
- Omia cymbalariae (Hübner, 1809)
- Omphalophana anatolica (Lederer, 1857)
- Omphalophana antirrhinii (Hübner, 1803)
- Opigena polygona (Denis & Schiffermüller, 1775)
- Oria musculosa (Hübner, 1808)
- Orthosia gracilis (Denis & Schiffermüller, 1775)
- Orthosia opima (Hübner, 1809)
- Orthosia cerasi (Fabricius, 1775)
- Orthosia cruda (Denis & Schiffermüller, 1775)
- Orthosia dalmatica (Wagner, 1909)
- Orthosia miniosa (Denis & Schiffermüller, 1775)
- Orthosia populeti (Fabricius, 1775)
- Orthosia incerta (Hufnagel, 1766)
- Orthosia gothica (Linnaeus, 1758)
- Oxicesta chamoenices (Herrich-Schäffer, 1845)
- Oxicesta geographica (Fabricius, 1787)
- Oxytripia orbiculosa (Esper, 1799)
- Pachetra sagittigera (Hufnagel, 1766)
- Panchrysia aurea (Hübner, 1803)
- Panchrysia v-argenteum (Esper, 1798)
- Panemeria tenebrata (Scopoli, 1763)
- Panolis flammea (Denis & Schiffermüller, 1775)
- Papestra biren (Goeze, 1781)
- Parastichtis suspecta (Hübner, 1817)
- Peridroma saucia (Hübner, 1808)
- Perigrapha i-cinctum (Denis & Schiffermüller, 1775)
- Perigrapha rorida Frivaldszky, 1835
- Periphanes delphinii (Linnaeus, 1758)
- Philareta treitschkei (Frivaldszky, 1835)
- Phlogophora meticulosa (Linnaeus, 1758)
- Phlogophora scita (Hübner, 1790)
- Photedes captiuncula (Treitschke, 1825)
- Photedes extrema (Hübner, 1809)
- Photedes minima (Haworth, 1809)
- Photedes morrisii (Dale, 1837)
- Phyllophila obliterata (Rambur, 1833)
- Plusidia cheiranthi (Tauscher, 1809)
- Polia bombycina (Hufnagel, 1766)
- Polia nebulosa (Hufnagel, 1766)
- Polia serratilinea Ochsenheimer, 1816
- Polychrysia moneta (Fabricius, 1787)
- Polymixis culoti (Schawerda, 1921)
- Polymixis leuconota (Frivaldszky, 1841)
- Polymixis flavicincta (Denis & Schiffermüller, 1775)
- Polymixis polymita (Linnaeus, 1761)
- Polymixis rufocincta (Geyer, 1828)
- Polymixis serpentina (Treitschke, 1825)
- Polyphaenis sericata (Esper, 1787)
- Praestilbia armeniaca Staudinger, 1892
- Protoschinia scutosa (Denis & Schiffermüller, 1775)
- Pseudeustrotia candidula (Denis & Schiffermüller, 1775)
- Pseudluperina pozzii (Curo, 1883)
- Pyrrhia purpura (Hübner, 1817)
- Pyrrhia umbra (Hufnagel, 1766)
- Rhizedra lutosa (Hübner, 1803)
- Rhyacia lucipeta (Denis & Schiffermüller, 1775)
- Rhyacia simulans (Hufnagel, 1766)
- Rileyiana fovea (Treitschke, 1825)
- Schinia cardui (Hübner, 1790)
- Schinia cognata (Freyer, 1833)
- Scotochrosta pulla (Denis & Schiffermüller, 1775)
- Sesamia cretica Lederer, 1857
- Sesamia nonagrioides Lefebvre, 1827
- Sideridis rivularis (Fabricius, 1775)
- Sideridis implexa (Hübner, 1809)
- Sideridis kitti (Schawerda, 1914)
- Sideridis reticulata (Goeze, 1781)
- Sideridis lampra (Schawerda, 1913)
- Sideridis turbida (Esper, 1790)
- Simyra albovenosa (Goeze, 1781)
- Simyra dentinosa Freyer, 1838
- Simyra nervosa (Denis & Schiffermüller, 1775)
- Spaelotis ravida (Denis & Schiffermüller, 1775)
- Spaelotis senna (Freyer, 1829)
- Spodoptera exigua (Hübner, 1808)
- Standfussiana lucernea (Linnaeus, 1758)
- Stenoecia dos (Freyer, 1838)
- Subacronicta megacephala (Denis & Schiffermüller, 1775)
- Syngrapha devergens (Hübner, 1813)
- Synthymia fixa (Fabricius, 1787)
- Teinoptera lunaki (Boursin, 1940)
- Teinoptera olivina (Herrich-Schäffer, 1852)
- Thalpophila matura (Hufnagel, 1766)
- Tholera cespitis (Denis & Schiffermüller, 1775)
- Tholera decimalis (Poda, 1761)
- Thysanoplusia orichalcea (Fabricius, 1775)
- Tiliacea aurago (Denis & Schiffermüller, 1775)
- Tiliacea citrago (Linnaeus, 1758)
- Tiliacea cypreago (Hampson, 1906)
- Tiliacea sulphurago (Denis & Schiffermüller, 1775)
- Trachea atriplicis (Linnaeus, 1758)
- Trichoplusia ni (Hübner, 1803)
- Trigonophora flammea (Esper, 1785)
- Tyta luctuosa (Denis & Schiffermüller, 1775)
- Ulochlaena hirta (Hübner, 1813)
- Valeria jaspidea (Villers, 1789)
- Valeria oleagina (Denis & Schiffermüller, 1775)
- Xanthia gilvago (Denis & Schiffermüller, 1775)
- Xanthia icteritia (Hufnagel, 1766)
- Xanthia ocellaris (Borkhausen, 1792)
- Xanthia ruticilla (Esper, 1791)
- Xanthia togata (Esper, 1788)
- Xestia ashworthii (Doubleday, 1855)
- Xestia c-nigrum (Linnaeus, 1758)
- Xestia ditrapezium (Denis & Schiffermüller, 1775)
- Xestia baja (Denis & Schiffermüller, 1775)
- Xestia castanea (Esper, 1798)
- Xestia ochreago (Hübner, 1809)
- Xestia stigmatica (Hübner, 1813)
- Xestia xanthographa (Denis & Schiffermüller, 1775)
- Xylena exsoleta (Linnaeus, 1758)
- Xylena lunifera Warren, 1910
- Xylena vetusta (Hübner, 1813)

=== Nolidae ===
- Bena bicolorana (Fuessly, 1775)
- Earias clorana (Linnaeus, 1761)
- Earias vernana (Fabricius, 1787)
- Meganola albula (Denis & Schiffermüller, 1775)
- Meganola strigula (Denis & Schiffermüller, 1775)
- Meganola togatulalis (Hübner, 1796)
- Nola confusalis (Herrich-Schäffer, 1847)
- Nola cucullatella (Linnaeus, 1758)
- Nola subchlamydula Staudinger, 1871
- Nycteola asiatica (Krulikovsky, 1904)
- Nycteola columbana (Turner, 1925)
- Nycteola revayana (Scopoli, 1772)
- Nycteola siculana (Fuchs, 1899)
- Pseudoips prasinana (Linnaeus, 1758)

=== Notodontidae ===
- Cerura vinula (Linnaeus, 1758)
- Clostera anachoreta (Denis & Schiffermüller, 1775)
- Clostera anastomosis (Linnaeus, 1758)
- Clostera curtula (Linnaeus, 1758)
- Clostera pigra (Hufnagel, 1766)
- Dicranura ulmi (Denis & Schiffermüller, 1775)
- Drymonia dodonaea (Denis & Schiffermüller, 1775)
- Drymonia obliterata (Esper, 1785)
- Drymonia querna (Denis & Schiffermüller, 1775)
- Drymonia ruficornis (Hufnagel, 1766)
- Furcula bifida (Brahm, 1787)
- Furcula furcula (Clerck, 1759)
- Harpyia milhauseri (Fabricius, 1775)
- Notodonta dromedarius (Linnaeus, 1767)
- Notodonta ziczac (Linnaeus, 1758)
- Paradrymonia vittata (Staudinger, 1892)
- Peridea anceps (Goeze, 1781)
- Peridea korbi (Rebel, 1918)
- Phalera bucephala (Linnaeus, 1758)
- Phalera bucephaloides (Ochsenheimer, 1810)
- Pterostoma palpina (Clerck, 1759)
- Ptilodon capucina (Linnaeus, 1758)
- Spatalia argentina (Denis & Schiffermüller, 1775)
- Stauropus fagi (Linnaeus, 1758)
- Thaumetopoea processionea (Linnaeus, 1758)
- Thaumetopoea solitaria (Freyer, 1838)

=== Oecophoridae ===
- Alabonia staintoniella (Zeller, 1850)
- Aplota nigricans (Zeller, 1852)
- Batia internella Jackh, 1972
- Batia lambdella (Donovan, 1793)
- Batia lunaris (Haworth, 1828)
- Crassa unitella (Hübner, 1796)
- Dasycera oliviella (Fabricius, 1794)
- Denisia augustella (Hübner, 1796)
- Epicallima formosella (Denis & Schiffermüller, 1775)
- Fabiola pokornyi (Nickerl, 1864)
- Harpella forficella (Scopoli, 1763)
- Holoscolia huebneri Kocak, 1980
- Metalampra cinnamomea (Zeller, 1839)
- Oecophora bractella (Linnaeus, 1758)
- Pleurota aristella (Linnaeus, 1767)
- Pleurota filigerella Mann, 1867
- Pleurota nitens Staudinger, 1870
- Pleurota planella (Staudinger, 1859)
- Pleurota proteella Staudinger, 1880
- Pleurota pungitiella Herrich-Schäffer, 1854
- Pleurota pyropella (Denis & Schiffermüller, 1775)
- Pleurota vittalba Staudinger, 1871
- Schiffermuelleria schaefferella (Linnaeus, 1758)

=== Opostegidae ===
- Opostega salaciella (Treitschke, 1833)
- Opostega spatulella Herrich-Schäffer, 1855
- Pseudopostega crepusculella (Zeller, 1839)

=== Peleopodidae ===
- Carcina quercana (Fabricius, 1775)

=== Plutellidae ===
- Eidophasia messingiella (Fischer von Röslerstamm, 1840)
- Eidophasia syenitella Herrich-Schäffer, 1854
- Plutella xylostella (Linnaeus, 1758)
- Rhigognostis hufnagelii (Zeller, 1839)
- Rhigognostis wolfschlaegeri (Rebel, 1940)

=== Praydidae ===
- Atemelia torquatella (Lienig & Zeller, 1846)
- Prays oleae (Bernard, 1788)

=== Psychidae ===
- Acanthopsyche zelleri (Mann, 1855)
- Bijugis bombycella (Denis & Schiffermüller, 1775)
- Canephora hirsuta (Poda, 1761)
- Dahlica triquetrella (Hübner, 1813)
- Eochorica balcanica (Rebel, 1919)
- Eumasia parietariella (Heydenreich, 1851)
- Heliopsychidea graecella (Milliere, 1866)
- Megalophanes viciella (Denis & Schiffermüller, 1775)
- Oiketicoides lutea (Staudinger, 1870)
- Penestoglossa dardoinella (Milliere, 1863)
- Phalacropterix praecellens (Staudinger, 1870)
- Pseudobankesia macedoniella (Rebel, 1919)
- Psyche casta (Pallas, 1767)
- Psyche crassiorella Bruand, 1851
- Psychidea balcanica (Wehrli, 1933)
- Rebelia macedonica Pinker, 1956
- Rebelia sapho (Milliere, 1864)
- Reisseronia pusilella (Rebel, 1941)
- Taleporia tubulosa (Retzius, 1783)
- Typhonia ciliaris (Ochsenheimer, 1810)

=== Pterophoridae ===
- Agdistis adactyla (Hübner, 1819)
- Agdistis tamaricis (Zeller, 1847)
- Amblyptilia acanthadactyla (Hübner, 1813)
- Buszkoiana capnodactylus (Zeller, 1841)
- Calyciphora albodactylus (Fabricius, 1794)
- Calyciphora nephelodactyla (Eversmann, 1844)
- Calyciphora xanthodactyla (Treitschke, 1833)
- Capperia celeusi (Frey, 1886)
- Capperia fusca (O. Hofmann, 1898)
- Capperia hellenica Adamczewski, 1951
- Capperia maratonica Adamczewski, 1951
- Capperia trichodactyla (Denis & Schiffermüller, 1775)
- Cnaemidophorus rhododactyla (Denis & Schiffermüller, 1775)
- Crombrugghia distans (Zeller, 1847)
- Crombrugghia laetus (Zeller, 1847)
- Crombrugghia tristis (Zeller, 1841)
- Emmelina monodactyla (Linnaeus, 1758)
- Gillmeria miantodactylus (Zeller, 1841)
- Gillmeria ochrodactyla (Denis & Schiffermüller, 1775)
- Hellinsia carphodactyla (Hübner, 1813)
- Hellinsia inulae (Zeller, 1852)
- Hellinsia tephradactyla (Hübner, 1813)
- Merrifieldia baliodactylus (Zeller, 1841)
- Merrifieldia leucodactyla (Denis & Schiffermüller, 1775)
- Merrifieldia malacodactylus (Zeller, 1847)
- Merrifieldia tridactyla (Linnaeus, 1758)
- Oidaematophorus constanti Ragonot, 1875
- Oxyptilus ericetorum (Stainton, 1851)
- Oxyptilus parvidactyla (Haworth, 1811)
- Oxyptilus pilosellae (Zeller, 1841)
- Paraplatyptilia metzneri (Zeller, 1841)
- Platyptilia calodactyla (Denis & Schiffermüller, 1775)
- Platyptilia farfarellus Zeller, 1867
- Platyptilia nemoralis Zeller, 1841
- Platyptilia tesseradactyla (Linnaeus, 1761)
- Pterophorus ischnodactyla (Treitschke, 1835)
- Pterophorus pentadactyla (Linnaeus, 1758)
- Stangeia siceliota (Zeller, 1847)
- Stenoptilia bipunctidactyla (Scopoli, 1763)
- Stenoptilia graphodactyla (Treitschke, 1833)
- Stenoptilia lutescens (Herrich-Schäffer, 1855)
- Stenoptilia mannii (Zeller, 1852)
- Stenoptilia pelidnodactyla (Stein, 1837)
- Stenoptilia pterodactyla (Linnaeus, 1761)
- Stenoptilia zophodactylus (Duponchel, 1840)
- Wheeleria ivae (Kasy, 1960)
- Wheeleria obsoletus (Zeller, 1841)

=== Pyralidae ===
- Achroia grisella (Fabricius, 1794)
- Acrobasis advenella (Zincken, 1818)
- Acrobasis consociella (Hübner, 1813)
- Acrobasis dulcella (Zeller, 1848)
- Acrobasis glaucella Staudinger, 1859
- Acrobasis legatea (Haworth, 1811)
- Acrobasis marmorea (Haworth, 1811)
- Acrobasis obtusella (Hübner, 1796)
- Acrobasis sodalella Zeller, 1848
- Acrobasis suavella (Zincken, 1818)
- Acrobasis tumidana (Denis & Schiffermüller, 1775)
- Aglossa caprealis (Hübner, 1809)
- Aglossa pinguinalis (Linnaeus, 1758)
- Aglossa signicostalis Staudinger, 1871
- Alophia combustella (Herrich-Schäffer, 1855)
- Ancylosis cinnamomella (Duponchel, 1836)
- Ancylosis gracilella Ragonot, 1887
- Ancylosis hellenica (Staudinger, 1871)
- Ancylosis muliebris (Meyrick, 1937)
- Ancylosis oblitella (Zeller, 1848)
- Ancylosis roscidella (Eversmann, 1844)
- Aphomia sociella (Linnaeus, 1758)
- Aphomia zelleri de Joannis, 1932
- Apomyelois ceratoniae (Zeller, 1839)
- Asalebria florella (Mann, 1862)
- Asarta aethiopella (Duponchel, 1837)
- Bostra obsoletalis (Mann, 1884)
- Bradyrrhoa confiniella Zeller, 1848
- Bradyrrhoa gilveolella (Treitschke, 1832)
- Bradyrrhoa trapezella (Duponchel, 1836)
- Cadra furcatella (Herrich-Schäffer, 1849)
- Catastia marginea (Denis & Schiffermüller, 1775)
- Delplanqueia dilutella (Denis & Schiffermüller, 1775)
- Dioryctria abietella (Denis & Schiffermüller, 1775)
- Eccopisa effractella Zeller, 1848
- Elegia fallax (Staudinger, 1881)
- Elegia similella (Zincken, 1818)
- Ematheudes punctella (Treitschke, 1833)
- Endotricha flammealis (Denis & Schiffermüller, 1775)
- Ephestia elutella (Hübner, 1796)
- Ephestia unicolorella Staudinger, 1881
- Epischnia cretaciella Mann, 1869
- Epischnia illotella Zeller, 1839
- Epischnia prodromella (Hübner, 1799)
- Episcythrastis tabidella (Mann, 1864)
- Episcythrastis tetricella (Denis & Schiffermüller, 1775)
- Etiella zinckenella (Treitschke, 1832)
- Eurhodope cirrigerella (Zincken, 1818)
- Eurhodope incompta (Zeller, 1847)
- Eurhodope rosella (Scopoli, 1763)
- Euzophera bigella (Zeller, 1848)
- Euzophera cinerosella (Zeller, 1839)
- Euzophera fuliginosella (Heinemann, 1865)
- Euzophera lunulella (O. Costa, 1836)
- Euzophera pulchella Ragonot, 1887
- Euzopherodes charlottae (Rebel, 1914)
- Euzopherodes vapidella (Mann, 1857)
- Galleria mellonella (Linnaeus, 1758)
- Homoeosoma inustella Ragonot, 1884
- Homoeosoma nebulella (Denis & Schiffermüller, 1775)
- Homoeosoma nimbella (Duponchel, 1837)
- Homoeosoma sinuella (Fabricius, 1794)
- Hypochalcia ahenella (Denis & Schiffermüller, 1775)
- Hypochalcia lignella (Hübner, 1796)
- Hypochalcia orbipunctella Ragonot, 1887
- Hypotia massilialis (Duponchel, 1832)
- Hypsopygia costalis (Fabricius, 1775)
- Hypsopygia fulvocilialis (Duponchel, 1834)
- Hypsopygia glaucinalis (Linnaeus, 1758)
- Hypsopygia rubidalis (Denis & Schiffermüller, 1775)
- Hypsotropa limbella Zeller, 1848
- Insalebria serraticornella (Zeller, 1839)
- Isauria dilucidella (Duponchel, 1836)
- Keradere lepidella (Ragonot, 1887)
- Keradere tengstroemiella (Erschoff, 1874)
- Khorassania compositella (Treitschke, 1835)
- Lamoria anella (Denis & Schiffermüller, 1775)
- Loryma egregialis (Herrich-Schäffer, 1838)
- Matilella fusca (Haworth, 1811)
- Megasis rippertella (Zeller, 1839)
- Merulempista cingillella (Zeller, 1846)
- Metallosticha argyrogrammos (Zeller, 1847)
- Moitrelia obductella (Zeller, 1839)
- Myelois circumvoluta (Fourcroy, 1785)
- Nephopterix angustella (Hübner, 1796)
- Nyctegretis lineana (Scopoli, 1786)
- Oncocera semirubella (Scopoli, 1763)
- Oxybia transversella (Duponchel, 1836)
- Pempelia albariella Zeller, 1839
- Pempelia alpigenella (Duponchel, 1836)
- Pempelia amoenella (Zeller, 1848)
- Pempelia brephiella (Staudinger, 1879)
- Pempelia palumbella (Denis & Schiffermüller, 1775)
- Pempeliella macedoniella (Ragonot, 1887)
- Pempeliella ornatella (Denis & Schiffermüller, 1775)
- Pempeliella sororculella (Ragonot, 1887)
- Pempeliella sororiella Zeller, 1839
- Phycita coronatella (Guenee, 1845)
- Phycita meliella (Mann, 1864)
- Phycita metzneri (Zeller, 1846)
- Phycita pedisignella Ragonot, 1887
- Phycita poteriella (Zeller, 1846)
- Phycita roborella (Denis & Schiffermüller, 1775)
- Phycitodes albatella (Ragonot, 1887)
- Phycitodes binaevella (Hübner, 1813)
- Phycitodes inquinatella (Ragonot, 1887)
- Phycitodes lacteella (Rothschild, 1915)
- Phycitodes saxicola (Vaughan, 1870)
- Plodia interpunctella (Hübner, 1813)
- Psorosa dahliella (Treitschke, 1832)
- Psorosa mediterranella Amsel, 1953
- Pterothrixidia rufella (Duponchel, 1836)
- Pyralis farinalis (Linnaeus, 1758)
- Pyralis regalis Denis & Schiffermüller, 1775
- Raphimetopus ablutella (Zeller, 1839)
- Rhodophaea formosa (Haworth, 1811)
- Sciota imperialella (Ragonot, 1887)
- Selagia argyrella (Denis & Schiffermüller, 1775)
- Selagia spadicella (Hübner, 1796)
- Selagia subochrella (Herrich-Schäffer, 1849)
- Stemmatophora brunnealis (Treitschke, 1829)
- Stemmatophora combustalis (Fischer v. Röslerstamm, 1842)
- Stemmatophora honestalis (Treitschke, 1829)
- Synaphe antennalis (Fabricius, 1794)
- Synaphe moldavica (Esper, 1794)
- Synaphe punctalis (Fabricius, 1775)
- Trachonitis cristella (Denis & Schiffermüller, 1775)

=== Saturniidae ===
- Aglia tau (Linnaeus, 1758)
- Antheraea yamamai (Guerin-Meneville, 1861)
- Saturnia pavoniella (Scopoli, 1763)
- Saturnia spini (Denis & Schiffermüller, 1775)
- Saturnia caecigena Kupido, 1825
- Saturnia pyri (Denis & Schiffermüller, 1775)

=== Scythrididae ===
- Enolmis desidella (Lederer, 1855)
- Scythris aerariella (Herrich-Schäffer, 1855)
- Scythris albidella (Stainton, 1867)
- Scythris carboniella Jackh, 1978
- Scythris confluens (Staudinger, 1870)
- Scythris crassiuscula (Herrich-Schäffer, 1855)
- Scythris cuspidella (Denis & Schiffermüller, 1775)
- Scythris disparella (Tengstrom, 1848)
- Scythris dissimilella (Herrich-Schäffer, 1855)
- Scythris ericetella (Heinemann, 1872)
- Scythris knochella (Fabricius, 1794)
- Scythris laminella (Denis & Schiffermüller, 1775)
- Scythris limbella (Fabricius, 1775)
- Scythris pascuella (Zeller, 1855)
- Scythris picaepennis (Haworth, 1828)
- Scythris productella (Zeller, 1839)
- Scythris punctivittella (O. Costa, 1836)
- Scythris schleichiella (Zeller, 1870)
- Scythris subseliniella (Heinemann, 1876)
- Scythris tergestinella (Zeller, 1855)
- Scythris tributella (Zeller, 1847)
- Scythris vittella (O. Costa, 1834)

=== Sesiidae ===
- Bembecia albanensis (Rebel, 1918)
- Bembecia ichneumoniformis (Denis & Schiffermüller, 1775)
- Bembecia megillaeformis (Hübner, 1813)
- Bembecia pavicevici Tosevski, 1989
- Bembecia scopigera (Scopoli, 1763)
- Bembecia uroceriformis (Treitschke, 1834)
- Chamaesphecia alysoniformis (Herrich-Schäffer, 1846)
- Chamaesphecia annellata (Zeller, 1847)
- Chamaesphecia astatiformis (Herrich-Schäffer, 1846)
- Chamaesphecia bibioniformis (Esper, 1800)
- Chamaesphecia chalciformis (Esper, 1804)
- Chamaesphecia doleriformis (Herrich-Schäffer, 1846)
- Chamaesphecia dumonti Le Cerf, 1922
- Chamaesphecia empiformis (Esper, 1783)
- Chamaesphecia euceraeformis (Ochsenheimer, 1816)
- Chamaesphecia leucopsiformis (Esper, 1800)
- Chamaesphecia masariformis (Ochsenheimer, 1808)
- Chamaesphecia nigrifrons (Le Cerf, 1911)
- Chamaesphecia proximata (Staudinger, 1891)
- Chamaesphecia schmidtiiformis (Freyer, 1836)
- Chamaesphecia tenthrediniformis (Denis & Schiffermüller, 1775)
- Chamaesphecia thracica Z. Lastuvka, 1983
- Paranthrene diaphana Dalla Torre & Strand, 1925
- Paranthrene insolitus Le Cerf, 1914
- Paranthrene tabaniformis (Rottemburg, 1775)
- Pennisetia hylaeiformis (Laspeyres, 1801)
- Pyropteron affinis (Staudinger, 1856)
- Pyropteron leucomelaena (Zeller, 1847)
- Pyropteron minianiformis (Freyer, 1843)
- Pyropteron muscaeformis (Esper, 1783)
- Pyropteron triannuliformis (Freyer, 1843)
- Sesia apiformis (Clerck, 1759)
- Sesia pimplaeformis Oberthur, 1872
- Synanthedon andrenaeformis (Laspeyres, 1801)
- Synanthedon cephiformis (Ochsenheimer, 1808)
- Synanthedon conopiformis (Esper, 1782)
- Synanthedon culiciformis (Linnaeus, 1758)
- Synanthedon formicaeformis (Esper, 1783)
- Synanthedon loranthi (Kralicek, 1966)
- Synanthedon mesiaeformis (Herrich-Schäffer, 1846)
- Synanthedon myopaeformis (Borkhausen, 1789)
- Synanthedon spheciformis (Denis & Schiffermüller, 1775)
- Synanthedon spuleri (Fuchs, 1908)
- Synanthedon stomoxiformis (Hübner, 1790)
- Synanthedon tipuliformis (Clerck, 1759)
- Synanthedon vespiformis (Linnaeus, 1761)
- Tinthia brosiformis (Hübner, 1813)
- Tinthia myrmosaeformis (Herrich-Schäffer, 1846)
- Tinthia tineiformis (Esper, 1789)

=== Sphingidae ===
- Acherontia atropos (Linnaeus, 1758)
- Agrius convolvuli (Linnaeus, 1758)
- Daphnis nerii (Linnaeus, 1758)
- Deilephila elpenor (Linnaeus, 1758)
- Deilephila porcellus (Linnaeus, 1758)
- Hemaris croatica (Esper, 1800)
- Hemaris fuciformis (Linnaeus, 1758)
- Hemaris tityus (Linnaeus, 1758)
- Hyles euphorbiae (Linnaeus, 1758)
- Hyles livornica (Esper, 1780)
- Laothoe populi (Linnaeus, 1758)
- Macroglossum stellatarum (Linnaeus, 1758)
- Marumba quercus (Denis & Schiffermüller, 1775)
- Mimas tiliae (Linnaeus, 1758)
- Proserpinus proserpina (Pallas, 1772)
- Smerinthus ocellata (Linnaeus, 1758)
- Sphingoneopsis gorgoniades (Hübner, 1819)
- Sphinx ligustri Linnaeus, 1758
- Theretra alecto (Linnaeus, 1758)

=== Tineidae ===
- Ateliotum hungaricellum Zeller, 1839
- Cephimallota angusticostella (Zeller, 1839)
- Cephimallota crassiflavella Bruand, 1851
- Eudarcia forsteri (Petersen, 1964)
- Eudarcia granulatella (Zeller, 1852)
- Eudarcia kasyi (Petersen, 1971)
- Euplocamus anthracinalis (Scopoli, 1763)
- Euplocamus ophisus (Cramer, 1779)
- Hapsifera luridella Zeller, 1847
- Infurcitinea albanica Petersen, 1963
- Infurcitinea albicomella (Stainton, 1851)
- Infurcitinea banatica Petersen, 1961
- Infurcitinea kasyi Petersen, 1962
- Infurcitinea lakoniae Gaedike, 1983
- Infurcitinea ochridella Petersen, 1962
- Infurcitinea rumelicella (Rebel, 1903)
- Lichenotinea pustulatella (Zeller, 1852)
- Monopis crocicapitella (Clemens, 1859)
- Monopis imella (Hübner, 1813)
- Monopis laevigella (Denis & Schiffermüller, 1775)
- Monopis obviella (Denis & Schiffermüller, 1775)
- Morophaga choragella (Denis & Schiffermüller, 1775)
- Myrmecozela parnassiella (Rebel, 1915)
- Nemapogon clematella (Fabricius, 1781)
- Nemapogon granella (Linnaeus, 1758)
- Nemapogon gravosaellus Petersen, 1957
- Nemapogon hungaricus Gozmany, 1960
- Nemapogon inconditella (Lucas, 1956)
- Nemapogon signatellus Petersen, 1957
- Neurothaumasia ankerella (Mann, 1867)
- Neurothaumasia macedonica Petersen, 1962
- Niditinea striolella (Matsumura, 1931)
- Reisserita relicinella (Herrich-Schäffer, 1853)
- Stenoptinea cyaneimarmorella (Milliere, 1854)
- Tinea basifasciella Ragonot, 1895
- Tinea flavescentella Haworth, 1828
- Tinea pellionella Linnaeus, 1758
- Tinea trinotella Thunberg, 1794
- Triaxomasia caprimulgella (Stainton, 1851)
- Trichophaga bipartitella (Ragonot, 1892)

=== Tischeriidae ===
- Coptotriche angusticollella (Duponchel, 1843)
- Coptotriche marginea (Haworth, 1828)
- Tischeria decidua Wocke, 1876
- Tischeria ekebladella (Bjerkander, 1795)

=== Tortricidae ===
- Acleris bergmanniana (Linnaeus, 1758)
- Acleris boscanoides Razowski, 1959
- Acleris forsskaleana (Linnaeus, 1758)
- Acleris hastiana (Linnaeus, 1758)
- Acleris holmiana (Linnaeus, 1758)
- Acleris literana (Linnaeus, 1758)
- Acleris permutana (Duponchel, 1836)
- Acleris quercinana (Zeller, 1849)
- Acleris rhombana (Denis & Schiffermüller, 1775)
- Acleris schalleriana (Linnaeus, 1761)
- Acleris sparsana (Denis & Schiffermüller, 1775)
- Acleris variegana (Denis & Schiffermüller, 1775)
- Aethes bilbaensis (Rossler, 1877)
- Aethes flagellana (Duponchel, 1836)
- Aethes francillana (Fabricius, 1794)
- Aethes hartmanniana (Clerck, 1759)
- Aethes kasyi Razowski, 1962
- Aethes margaritana (Haworth, 1811)
- Aethes margarotana (Duponchel, 1836)
- Aethes moribundana (Staudinger, 1859)
- Aethes nefandana (Kennel, 1899)
- Aethes rutilana (Hübner, 1817)
- Aethes sanguinana (Treitschke, 1830)
- Aethes smeathmanniana (Fabricius, 1781)
- Aethes tesserana (Denis & Schiffermüller, 1775)
- Aethes tornella (Walsingham, 1898)
- Agapeta hamana (Linnaeus, 1758)
- Agapeta zoegana (Linnaeus, 1767)
- Aleimma loeflingiana (Linnaeus, 1758)
- Ancylis achatana (Denis & Schiffermüller, 1775)
- Ancylis apicella (Denis & Schiffermüller, 1775)
- Ancylis comptana (Frolich, 1828)
- Ancylis mitterbacheriana (Denis & Schiffermüller, 1775)
- Ancylis selenana (Guenee, 1845)
- Ancylis tineana (Hübner, 1799)
- Aphelia viburniana (Denis & Schiffermüller, 1775)
- Aphelia euxina (Djakonov, 1929)
- Aphelia ferugana (Hübner, 1793)
- Apotomis capreana (Hübner, 1817)
- Archips podana (Scopoli, 1763)
- Archips rosana (Linnaeus, 1758)
- Archips xylosteana (Linnaeus, 1758)
- Argyroploce arbutella (Linnaeus, 1758)
- Avaria hyerana (Milliere, 1858)
- Bactra furfurana (Haworth, 1811)
- Bactra lancealana (Hübner, 1799)
- Celypha lacunana (Denis & Schiffermüller, 1775)
- Celypha rurestrana (Duponchel, 1843)
- Celypha striana (Denis & Schiffermüller, 1775)
- Choristoneura hebenstreitella (Muller, 1764)
- Clepsis balcanica (Rebel, 1917)
- Clepsis burgasiensis (Rebel, 1916)
- Clepsis consimilana (Hübner, 1817)
- Clepsis pallidana (Fabricius, 1776)
- Clepsis rurinana (Linnaeus, 1758)
- Clepsis senecionana (Hübner, 1819)
- Cnephasia alticolana (Herrich-Schäffer, 1851)
- Cnephasia asseclana (Denis & Schiffermüller, 1775)
- Cnephasia communana (Herrich-Schäffer, 1851)
- Cnephasia cupressivorana (Staudinger, 1871)
- Cnephasia graecana Rebel, 1902
- Cnephasia heringi Razowski, 1958
- Cnephasia klimeschi Razowski, 1956
- Cnephasia stephensiana (Doubleday, 1849)
- Cnephasia abrasana (Duponchel, 1843)
- Cnephasia incertana (Treitschke, 1835)
- Cochylidia implicitana (Wocke, 1856)
- Cochylidia subroseana (Haworth, 1811)
- Cochylimorpha jucundana (Treitschke, 1835)
- Cochylimorpha meridiana (Staudinger, 1859)
- Cochylimorpha straminea (Haworth, 1811)
- Cochylis dubitana (Hübner, 1799)
- Cochylis epilinana Duponchel, 1842
- Cochylis pallidana Zeller, 1847
- Cochylis posterana Zeller, 1847
- Cochylis roseana (Haworth, 1811)
- Cochylis salebrana (Mann, 1862)
- Crocidosema plebejana Zeller, 1847
- Cryptocochylis conjunctana (Mann, 1864)
- Cydia amplana (Hübner, 1800)
- Cydia duplicana (Zetterstedt, 1839)
- Cydia fagiglandana (Zeller, 1841)
- Cydia inquinatana (Hübner, 1800)
- Cydia pactolana (Zeller, 1840)
- Cydia pomonella (Linnaeus, 1758)
- Cydia pyrivora (Danilevsky, 1947)
- Cydia splendana (Hübner, 1799)
- Cydia succedana (Denis & Schiffermüller, 1775)
- Cydia ulicetana (Haworth, 1811)
- Diceratura ostrinana (Guenee, 1845)
- Diceratura rhodograpta Djakonov, 1929
- Diceratura roseofasciana (Mann, 1855)
- Dichelia histrionana (Frolich, 1828)
- Dichrorampha cinerosana (Herrich-Schäffer, 1851)
- Dichrorampha coniana Obraztsov, 1953
- Dichrorampha gruneriana (Herrich-Schäffer, 1851)
- Dichrorampha petiverella (Linnaeus, 1758)
- Dichrorampha plumbagana (Treitschke, 1830)
- Dichrorampha plumbana (Scopoli, 1763)
- Doloploca punctulana (Denis & Schiffermüller, 1775)
- Eana derivana (de La Harpe, 1858)
- Eana incanana (Stephens, 1852)
- Eana italica (Obraztsov, 1950)
- Eana penziana (Thunberg, 1791)
- Eana argentana (Clerck, 1759)
- Eana osseana (Scopoli, 1763)
- Eana canescana (Guenee, 1845)
- Enarmonia formosana (Scopoli, 1763)
- Endothenia marginana (Haworth, 1811)
- Endothenia nigricostana (Haworth, 1811)
- Epagoge grotiana (Fabricius, 1781)
- Epiblema costipunctana (Haworth, 1811)
- Epiblema gammana (Mann, 1866)
- Epiblema graphana (Treitschke, 1835)
- Epiblema hepaticana (Treitschke, 1835)
- Epiblema inulivora (Meyrick, 1932)
- Epiblema scutulana (Denis & Schiffermüller, 1775)
- Epiblema sticticana (Fabricius, 1794)
- Epiblema turbidana (Treitschke, 1835)
- Epinotia abbreviana (Fabricius, 1794)
- Epinotia dalmatana (Rebel, 1891)
- Epinotia festivana (Hübner, 1799)
- Epinotia kochiana (Herrich-Schäffer, 1851)
- Epinotia thapsiana (Zeller, 1847)
- Eucosma albidulana (Herrich-Schäffer, 1851)
- Eucosma campoliliana (Denis & Schiffermüller, 1775)
- Eucosma cana (Haworth, 1811)
- Eucosma conformana (Mann, 1872)
- Eucosma conterminana (Guenee, 1845)
- Eucosma lugubrana (Treitschke, 1830)
- Eudemis profundana (Denis & Schiffermüller, 1775)
- Eugnosta lathoniana (Hübner, 1800)
- Eugnosta magnificana (Rebel, 1914)
- Eupoecilia ambiguella (Hübner, 1796)
- Eupoecilia angustana (Hübner, 1799)
- Eupoecilia cebrana (Hübner, 1813)
- Falseuncaria ruficiliana (Haworth, 1811)
- Grapholita funebrana Treitschke, 1835
- Grapholita molesta (Busck, 1916)
- Grapholita lunulana (Denis & Schiffermüller, 1775)
- Grapholita nebritana Treitschke, 1830
- Gypsonoma aceriana (Duponchel, 1843)
- Gypsonoma dealbana (Frolich, 1828)
- Gypsonoma minutana (Hübner, 1799)
- Hedya nubiferana (Haworth, 1811)
- Hedya ochroleucana (Frolich, 1828)
- Hedya pruniana (Hübner, 1799)
- Hysterophora maculosana (Haworth, 1811)
- Isotrias hybridana (Hübner, 1817)
- Lathronympha strigana (Fabricius, 1775)
- Lobesia bicinctana (Duponchel, 1844)
- Lobesia botrana (Denis & Schiffermüller, 1775)
- Lobesia indusiana (Zeller, 1847)
- Metendothenia atropunctana (Zetterstedt, 1839)
- Neosphaleroptera nubilana (Hübner, 1799)
- Notocelia cynosbatella (Linnaeus, 1758)
- Notocelia incarnatana (Hübner, 1800)
- Notocelia roborana (Denis & Schiffermüller, 1775)
- Notocelia trimaculana (Haworth, 1811)
- Notocelia uddmanniana (Linnaeus, 1758)
- Olethreutes arcuella (Clerck, 1759)
- Orthotaenia undulana (Denis & Schiffermüller, 1775)
- Pammene blockiana (Herrich-Schäffer, 1851)
- Pammene christophana (Moschler, 1862)
- Pammene fasciana (Linnaeus, 1761)
- Pammene mariana (Zerny, 1920)
- Pammene percognata Diakonoff, 1976
- Pammene rhediella (Clerck, 1759)
- Pammene splendidulana (Guenee, 1845)
- Pandemis cerasana (Hübner, 1786)
- Pandemis heparana (Denis & Schiffermüller, 1775)
- Paramesia gnomana (Clerck, 1759)
- Pelochrista mollitana (Zeller, 1847)
- Periclepsis cinctana (Denis & Schiffermüller, 1775)
- Phalonidia contractana (Zeller, 1847)
- Phalonidia manniana (Fischer v. Röslerstamm, 1839)
- Phaneta pauperana (Duponchel, 1843)
- Phiaris stibiana (Guenee, 1845)
- Phtheochroa duponchelana (Duponchel, 1843)
- Phtheochroa pulvillana Herrich-Schäffer, 1851
- Phtheochroa sodaliana (Haworth, 1811)
- Prochlidonia amiantana (Hübner, 1799)
- Propiromorpha rhodophana (Herrich-Schäffer, 1851)
- Pseudargyrotoza conwagana (Fabricius, 1775)
- Pseudeulia asinana (Hübner, 1799)
- Ptycholoma lecheana (Linnaeus, 1758)
- Ptycholomoides aeriferana (Herrich-Schäffer, 1851)
- Rhopobota myrtillana (Humphreys & Westwood, 1845)
- Rhyacionia duplana (Hübner, 1813)
- Sparganothis pilleriana (Denis & Schiffermüller, 1775)
- Spilonota ocellana (Denis & Schiffermüller, 1775)
- Strophedra weirana (Douglas, 1850)
- Thiodia citrana (Hübner, 1799)
- Thiodia major (Rebel, 1903)
- Thiodia trochilana (Frolich, 1828)
- Tortricodes alternella (Denis & Schiffermüller, 1775)
- Tortrix viridana Linnaeus, 1758
- Xerocnephasia rigana (Sodoffsky, 1829)
- Zeiraphera isertana (Fabricius, 1794)

=== Yponomeutidae ===
- Kessleria saxifragae (Stainton, 1868)
- Kessleria alpicella (Stainton, 1851)
- Kessleria macedonica Huemer & Tarmann, 1992
- Pseudoswammerdamia combinella (Hübner, 1786)
- Scythropia crataegella (Linnaeus, 1767)
- Swammerdamia pyrella (Villers, 1789)
- Yponomeuta padella (Linnaeus, 1758)
- Yponomeuta plumbella (Denis & Schiffermüller, 1775)
- Yponomeuta sedella Treitschke, 1832
- Zelleria hepariella Stainton, 1849

=== Ypsolophidae ===
- Ypsolopha albiramella (Mann, 1861)
- Ypsolopha instabilella (Mann, 1866)
- Ypsolopha lucella (Fabricius, 1775)
- Ypsolopha parenthesella (Linnaeus, 1761)
- Ypsolopha persicella (Fabricius, 1787)
- Ypsolopha scabrella (Linnaeus, 1761)
- Ypsolopha semitessella (Mann, 1861)
- Ypsolopha ustella (Clerck, 1759)

=== Zygaenidae ===
- Adscita albanica (Naufock, 1926)
- Adscita geryon (Hübner, 1813)
- Adscita obscura (Zeller, 1847)
- Adscita statices (Linnaeus, 1758)
- Adscita mannii (Lederer, 1853)
- Jordanita chloros (Hübner, 1813)
- Jordanita globulariae (Hübner, 1793)
- Jordanita graeca (Jordan, 1907)
- Jordanita subsolana (Staudinger, 1862)
- Jordanita budensis (Ad. & Au. Speyer, 1858)
- Jordanita notata (Zeller, 1847)
- Rhagades pruni (Denis & Schiffermüller, 1775)
- Theresimima ampellophaga (Bayle-Barelle, 1808)
- Zygaena carniolica (Scopoli, 1763)
- Zygaena brizae (Esper, 1800)
- Zygaena laeta (Hübner, 1790)
- Zygaena minos (Denis & Schiffermüller, 1775)
- Zygaena punctum Ochsenheimer, 1808
- Zygaena purpuralis (Brunnich, 1763)
- Zygaena angelicae Ochsenheimer, 1808
- Zygaena ephialtes (Linnaeus, 1767)
- Zygaena exulans (Hohenwarth, 1792)
- Zygaena filipendulae (Linnaeus, 1758)
- Zygaena lonicerae (Scheven, 1777)
- Zygaena loti (Denis & Schiffermüller, 1775)
- Zygaena nevadensis Rambur, 1858
- Zygaena osterodensis Reiss, 1921
- Zygaena viciae (Denis & Schiffermüller, 1775)
