= Bucculatrix pseudosylvella =

Scientific classification
- Kingdom: Animalia
- Phylum: Arthropoda
- Clade: Pancrustacea
- Class: Insecta
- Order: Lepidoptera
- Family: Bucculatricidae
- Genus: Bucculatrix
- Species: B. pseudosylvella

Binomial name
- Bucculatrix pseudosylvella Rebel, 1941

Species of moth

Bucculatrix pseudosylvella is a moth in the family Bucculatricidae. It was described by Hans Rebel in 1941. It is found in Portugal, North Macedonia and Turkey.

The wingspan is about 6 mm.
