= Coleophora agrianella =

Scientific classification
- Kingdom: Animalia
- Phylum: Arthropoda
- Class: Insecta
- Order: Lepidoptera
- Family: Coleophoridae
- Genus: Coleophora
- Species: C. agrianella

Binomial name
- Coleophora agrianella Rebel, 1934

Species of moth

Coleophora agrianella is a moth of the family Coleophoridae. It is found in Serbia, North Macedonia and Bulgaria.

The larvae feed on Astragalus onobrychis.
