= Coleophora treskaensis =

Scientific classification
- Kingdom: Animalia
- Phylum: Arthropoda
- Class: Insecta
- Order: Lepidoptera
- Family: Coleophoridae
- Genus: Coleophora
- Species: C. treskaensis

Binomial name
- Coleophora treskaensis Toll & Amsel, 1967

Synonyms
- Coleophora psammion Falkovitsh, 1973; Coleophora sciurella Baldizzone, 1987

Species of moth

Coleophora treskaensis is a moth of the family Coleophoridae. It is found in Spain, France, Italy, North Macedonia, Afghanistan, Turkestan and Uzbekistan.

The wingspan is over 7 mm.

The larvae feed on Casignetella and Artemisia species. It has a length of about 4 mm. Larvae can be found in May.
