= Scythris carboniella =

Scientific classification
- Kingdom: Animalia
- Phylum: Arthropoda
- Class: Insecta
- Order: Lepidoptera
- Family: Scythrididae
- Genus: Scythris
- Species: S. carboniella

Binomial name
- Scythris carboniella Jäckh, 1978

Species of moth

Scythris carboniella is a moth of the family Scythrididae. It was described by Jäckh in 1978. It is found in France, Italy, North Macedonia and former Yugoslavia.
