= Phyllonorycter turanica =

Scientific classification
- Domain: Eukaryota
- Kingdom: Animalia
- Phylum: Arthropoda
- Class: Insecta
- Order: Lepidoptera
- Family: Gracillariidae
- Genus: Phyllonorycter
- Species: P. turanica

Binomial name
- Phyllonorycter turanica (Gerasimov, 1931)

Synonyms
- Lithocolletis turanica Gerasimov, 1931

Species of moth

Phyllonorycter turanica is a moth of the family Gracillariidae. It is known from Afghanistan, North Macedonia, Armenia, Iran, Azerbaijan, Georgia, Kazakhstan, Kyrgyzstan, the Caucasus, Tajikistan, Turkmenistan and Uzbekistan.

There are up to five generations per year.

The larvae feed on Cerasus, Crataegus laciniata, Cydonia species (including Cydonia oblonga), Malus species (including Malus domestica), Prunus dulcis and Pyrus species. They mine the leaves of their host plant.
