= Phyllonorycter macedonica =

Scientific classification
- Kingdom: Animalia
- Phylum: Arthropoda
- Class: Insecta
- Order: Lepidoptera
- Family: Gracillariidae
- Genus: Phyllonorycter
- Species: P. macedonica

Binomial name
- Phyllonorycter macedonica (Deschka, 1971)

Synonyms
- Lithocolletis macedonica Deschka, 1971

Species of moth

Phyllonorycter macedonica is a moth of the family Gracillariidae. It is known from North Macedonia and Greece.

The larvae feed on Crataegus laciniata. They mine the leaves of their host plant. They create a lower surface tentiform mine.
