= Coleophora depunctella =

Scientific classification
- Kingdom: Animalia
- Phylum: Arthropoda
- Class: Insecta
- Order: Lepidoptera
- Family: Coleophoridae
- Genus: Coleophora
- Species: C. depunctella

Binomial name
- Coleophora depunctella Toll, 1961

Species of moth

Coleophora depunctella is a moth of the family Coleophoridae. It is found in North Macedonia and Greece.
