= Pyrausta trimaculalis =

Scientific classification
- Kingdom: Animalia
- Phylum: Arthropoda
- Clade: Pancrustacea
- Class: Insecta
- Order: Lepidoptera
- Family: Crambidae
- Genus: Pyrausta
- Species: P. trimaculalis

Binomial name
- Pyrausta trimaculalis (Staudinger, 1867)

Synonyms
- Botys trimaculalis Staudinger, 1867

Species of moth

Pyrausta trimaculalis is a species of moth in the family Crambidae. It is found in North Macedonia, Greece and Turkey.
