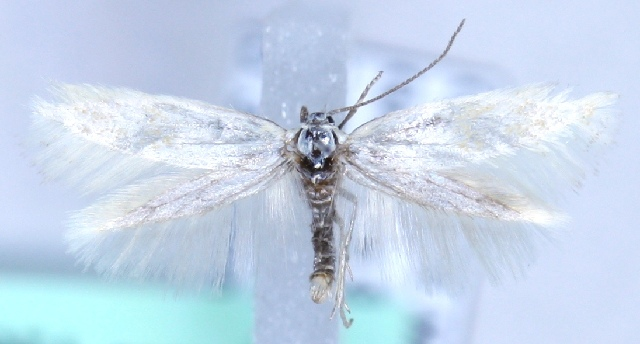

Scientific classification
- Domain: Eukaryota
- Kingdom: Animalia
- Phylum: Arthropoda
- Class: Insecta
- Order: Lepidoptera
- Family: Elachistidae
- Genus: Elachista
- Species: E. dumosa

Binomial name
- Elachista dumosa Parenti, 1981

Synonyms
- Elachista kimmeriella Sinev & Budashkin, 1991

= Elachista dumosa =

Species of moth

Elachista dumosa is a moth of the family Elachistidae that can be found in North Macedonia and Ukraine.
