= Phyllonorycter trojana =

Scientific classification
- Kingdom: Animalia
- Phylum: Arthropoda
- Class: Insecta
- Order: Lepidoptera
- Family: Gracillariidae
- Genus: Phyllonorycter
- Species: P. trojana

Binomial name
- Phyllonorycter trojana Deschka, 1982

Species of moth

Phyllonorycter trojana is a moth of the family Gracillariidae. It is known from Montenegro, North Macedonia and Greece.

The larvae feed on Quercus trojana. They mine the leaves of their host plant.
