= Eupithecia inconspicuata =

Scientific classification
- Domain: Eukaryota
- Kingdom: Animalia
- Phylum: Arthropoda
- Class: Insecta
- Order: Lepidoptera
- Family: Geometridae
- Genus: Eupithecia
- Species: E. inconspicuata

Binomial name
- Eupithecia inconspicuata Bohatsch, 1893

Synonyms
- Eupithecia thurnerata Schütze, 1958

Species of moth

Eupithecia inconspicuata is a moth in the family Geometridae. It is found in Turkey.
