= Coleophora audeoudi =

Scientific classification
- Kingdom: Animalia
- Phylum: Arthropoda
- Class: Insecta
- Order: Lepidoptera
- Family: Coleophoridae
- Genus: Coleophora
- Species: C. audeoudi

Binomial name
- Coleophora audeoudi Rebel, 1935

Synonyms
- Coleophora tolliella Oudejans, 1971

Species of moth

Coleophora audeoudi is a species of moth in the family Coleophoridae. It is found in North Macedonia and Turkey.
