= Coleophora narbonensis =

Scientific classification
- Kingdom: Animalia
- Phylum: Arthropoda
- Clade: Pancrustacea
- Class: Insecta
- Order: Lepidoptera
- Family: Coleophoridae
- Genus: Coleophora
- Species: C. narbonensis

Binomial name
- Coleophora narbonensis Baldizzone, 1990

Species of moth

Coleophora narbonensis is a moth of the family Coleophoridae. It is found in France, Hungary and North Macedonia.
