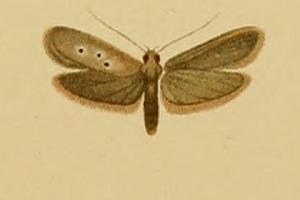

Scientific classification
- Kingdom: Animalia
- Phylum: Arthropoda
- Class: Insecta
- Order: Lepidoptera
- Family: Depressariidae
- Genus: Ethmia
- Species: E. tripunctella

Binomial name
- Ethmia tripunctella (Staudinger, 1879)

Synonyms
- Psecadia tripunctella Staudinger, 1879; Ethmia rayatella Amsel, 1959

= Ethmia tripunctella =

Species of moth

Ethmia tripunctella is a moth in the family Depressariidae. It is found in North Macedonia, Bulgaria, Asia Minor, Iraq, Iran and Russia.

The larvae have been recorded feeding on Onosma stellulata.

== Subspecies ==
- Ethmia tripunctella tripunctella (Staudinger, 1879) (North Macedonia, Bulgaria, Asia Minor)
- Ethmia tripunctella rayatella (Amsel, 1959) (Asia Minor: Taurus Mountains, Iraq: Kurdistan, south-western Iran)
