= Eupithecia mystica =

Scientific classification
- Domain: Eukaryota
- Kingdom: Animalia
- Phylum: Arthropoda
- Class: Insecta
- Order: Lepidoptera
- Family: Geometridae
- Genus: Eupithecia
- Species: E. mystica

Binomial name
- Eupithecia mystica Dietze, 1910

Synonyms
- Eupithecia gemellata f. mystica Dietze, 1910; Eupithecia wehrlii Wagner, 1931

Species of moth

Eupithecia mystica is a moth in the family Geometridae. It is found in Ukraine, North Macedonia, Greece and Romania.

The wingspan is about 17 mm.
