= Elachista ohridella =

Scientific classification
- Domain: Eukaryota
- Kingdom: Animalia
- Phylum: Arthropoda
- Class: Insecta
- Order: Lepidoptera
- Family: Elachistidae
- Genus: Elachista
- Species: E. ohridella

Binomial name
- Elachista ohridella Parenti, 2001

Species of moth

Elachista ohridella is a moth of the family Elachistidae. It is found in North Macedonia and Bulgaria.
