= Coleophora nigridorsella =

Scientific classification
- Kingdom: Animalia
- Phylum: Arthropoda
- Class: Insecta
- Order: Lepidoptera
- Family: Coleophoridae
- Genus: Coleophora
- Species: C. nigridorsella

Binomial name
- Coleophora nigridorsella Amsel, 1935

Species of moth

Coleophora nigridorsella is a moth of the family Coleophoridae. It is found in Greece, North Macedonia, southern Russia and the Palestinian Territories.
