= Chrysoteuchia lolotiella =

Scientific classification
- Domain: Eukaryota
- Kingdom: Animalia
- Phylum: Arthropoda
- Class: Insecta
- Order: Lepidoptera
- Family: Crambidae
- Genus: Chrysoteuchia
- Species: C. lolotiella

Binomial name
- Chrysoteuchia lolotiella (Caradja, 1927)

Synonyms
- Asartodes lolotiella Caradja, 1927

Species of moth

Chrysoteuchia lolotiella is a moth in the family Crambidae. It was described by Aristide Caradja in 1927. It is found in Sichuan, China.
