= Euchromius nivalis =

Scientific classification
- Kingdom: Animalia
- Phylum: Arthropoda
- Clade: Pancrustacea
- Class: Insecta
- Order: Lepidoptera
- Family: Crambidae
- Subfamily: Crambinae
- Tribe: Euchromiusini
- Genus: Euchromius
- Species: E. nivalis

Binomial name
- Euchromius nivalis (Caradja in Caradja & Meyrick, 1937)

Synonyms
- Eromene nivalis Caradja in Caradja & Meyrick, 1937

Species of moth

Euchromius nivalis is a moth in the family Crambidae. It was described by Aristide Caradja in 1937. It is found in Yunnan, China.
