= Dichomeris fuscanella =

Scientific classification
- Domain: Eukaryota
- Kingdom: Animalia
- Phylum: Arthropoda
- Class: Insecta
- Order: Lepidoptera
- Family: Gelechiidae
- Genus: Dichomeris
- Species: D. fuscanella

Binomial name
- Dichomeris fuscanella (Caradja, 1920)

Synonyms
- Nothris chinganella var. fuscanella Caradja, 1920

Species of moth

Dichomeris fuscanella is a moth in the family Gelechiidae. It was described by Aristide Caradja in 1920. It is found in Sikkim, India.
