= Chrysoteuchia funebrellus =

Scientific classification
- Kingdom: Animalia
- Phylum: Arthropoda
- Class: Insecta
- Order: Lepidoptera
- Family: Crambidae
- Genus: Chrysoteuchia
- Species: C. funebrellus

Binomial name
- Chrysoteuchia funebrellus (Caradja in Caradja & Meyrick, 1937)

Synonyms
- Crambus funebrellus Caradja in Caradja & Meyrick, 1937

Species of moth

Chrysoteuchia funebrellus is a moth in the family Crambidae. It was described by Aristide Caradja in 1937. It is found in Yunnan, China.
