= Elethyia taishanensis =

Scientific classification
- Kingdom: Animalia
- Phylum: Arthropoda
- Class: Insecta
- Order: Lepidoptera
- Family: Crambidae
- Subfamily: Crambinae
- Tribe: incertae sedis
- Genus: Elethyia
- Species: E. taishanensis

Binomial name
- Elethyia taishanensis (Caradja & Meyrick, 1937)

Synonyms
- Prionopteryx taishanensis Caradja & Meyrick, 1937

Species of moth

Elethyia taishanensis is a moth in the family Crambidae. It was described by Aristide Caradja and Edward Meyrick in 1937. It is found in the Chinese provinces of Shandong and Shaanxi.
