= Chrysoteuchia hyalodiscella =

Scientific classification
- Domain: Eukaryota
- Kingdom: Animalia
- Phylum: Arthropoda
- Class: Insecta
- Order: Lepidoptera
- Family: Crambidae
- Genus: Chrysoteuchia
- Species: C. hyalodiscella

Binomial name
- Chrysoteuchia hyalodiscella (Caradja, 1927)

Synonyms
- Asartodes hyalodiscella Caradja, 1927

Species of moth

Chrysoteuchia hyalodiscella is a moth in the family Crambidae. It was described by Aristide Caradja in 1927. It is found in Sichuan, China.
