= Pyrausta zeitunalis =

Scientific classification
- Domain: Eukaryota
- Kingdom: Animalia
- Phylum: Arthropoda
- Class: Insecta
- Order: Lepidoptera
- Family: Crambidae
- Genus: Pyrausta
- Species: P. zeitunalis

Binomial name
- Pyrausta zeitunalis Caradja, 1916

Species of moth

Pyrausta zeitunalis is a moth in the family Crambidae. It was described by Aristide Caradja in 1916. It is found in China.
