= Epiparbattia gloriosalis =

Scientific classification
- Domain: Eukaryota
- Kingdom: Animalia
- Phylum: Arthropoda
- Class: Insecta
- Order: Lepidoptera
- Family: Crambidae
- Genus: Epiparbattia
- Species: E. gloriosalis

Binomial name
- Epiparbattia gloriosalis Caradja, 1925

Species of moth

Epiparbattia gloriosalis is a moth in the family Crambidae. It was described by Aristide Caradja in 1925. It is found in China and India.

== Subspecies ==
- Epiparbattia gloriosalis gloriosalis (China)
- Epiparbattia gloriosalis whalleyi Munroe & Mutuura, 1971 (India: Assam)
