= Euchromius gratiosella =

Scientific classification
- Kingdom: Animalia
- Phylum: Arthropoda
- Clade: Pancrustacea
- Class: Insecta
- Order: Lepidoptera
- Family: Crambidae
- Subfamily: Crambinae
- Tribe: Euchromiusini
- Genus: Euchromius
- Species: E. gratiosella

Binomial name
- Euchromius gratiosella (Caradja, 1910)

Synonyms
- Eromene ramburiellus gratiosella Caradja, 1910; Euchromius gratiosellus; Euchromius gartheellus Derra, 1985

Species of moth

Euchromius gratiosella is a species of moth in the family Crambidae. It is found in Spain, Italy, Russia, Algeria, Turkey, Iran, Turkmenistan, Kazakhstan, Kyrgyzstan, Tadzhikistan and Mongolia.

The wingspan is 15–23 mm.
