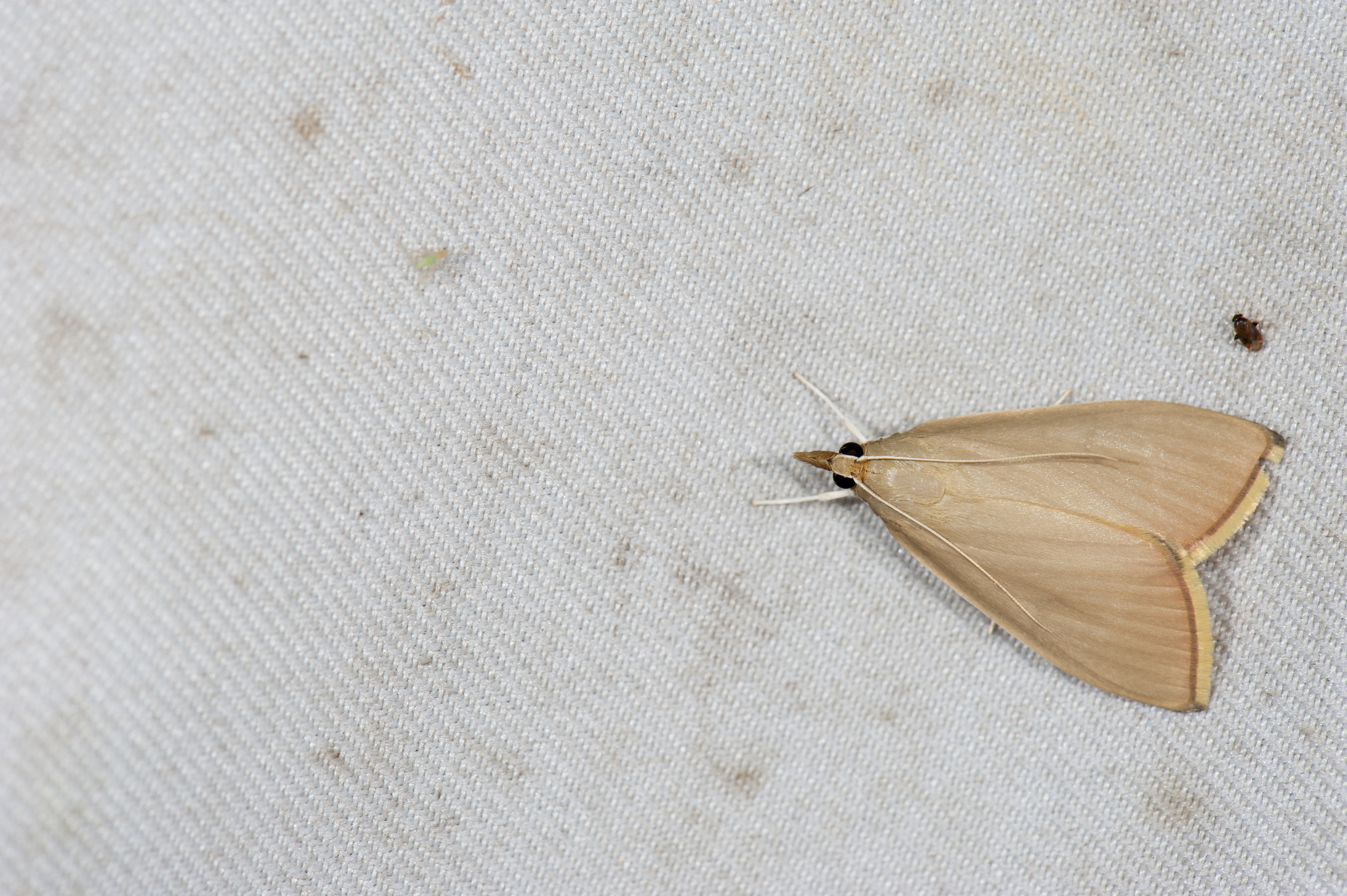

Scientific classification
- Domain: Eukaryota
- Kingdom: Animalia
- Phylum: Arthropoda
- Class: Insecta
- Order: Lepidoptera
- Family: Crambidae
- Genus: Eumorphobotys
- Species: E. eumorphalis

Binomial name
- Eumorphobotys eumorphalis Caradja, 1925

= Eumorphobotys eumorphalis =

Species of moth

Eumorphobotys eumorphalis is a moth in the family Crambidae. It was described by Aristide Caradja in 1925. It is found in China.
