= Hoeneodes sinensis =

Scientific classification
- Kingdom: Animalia
- Phylum: Arthropoda
- Class: Insecta
- Order: Lepidoptera
- Family: Pyralidae
- Genus: Hoeneodes
- Species: H. sinensis

Binomial name
- Hoeneodes sinensis (Caradja & Meyrick, 1937)

Synonyms
- Salebria romanoffella f. sinensis Caradja & Meyrick, 1937

Species of moth

Hoeneodes sinensis is a species of snout moth in the genus Hoeneodes. It was described by Aristide Caradja and Edward Meyrick in 1937. It is found in China.
