= Pyrausta delicatalis =

Scientific classification
- Domain: Eukaryota
- Kingdom: Animalia
- Phylum: Arthropoda
- Class: Insecta
- Order: Lepidoptera
- Family: Crambidae
- Genus: Pyrausta
- Species: P. delicatalis

Binomial name
- Pyrausta delicatalis Caradja, 1916

Species of moth

Pyrausta delicatalis is a moth in the family Crambidae. It was described by Aristide Caradja in 1916. It is found in Turkey.
