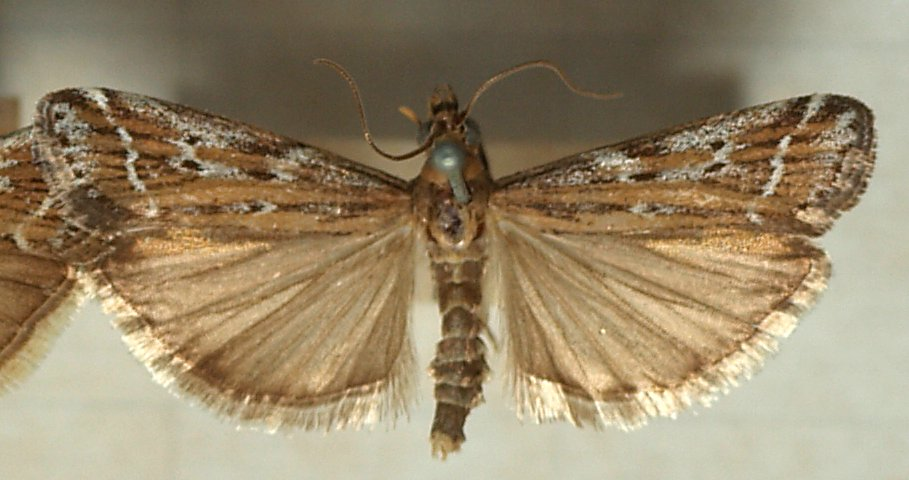
- Pempelia ornatella - dorsal view

Scientific classification
- Kingdom: Animalia
- Phylum: Arthropoda
- Clade: Pancrustacea
- Class: Insecta
- Order: Lepidoptera
- Family: Pyralidae
- Tribe: Phycitini
- Genus: Pempeliella; Caradja, 1916

Synonyms
- Pseudosyria Rebel, 1927

= Pempeliella =

Genus of moths

Pempeliella is a genus of moths of the family Pyralidae described by Aristide Caradja in 1916.

== Species ==
- Pempeliella alibotuschella (Drenowski, 1932)
- Pempeliella ardosiella (Ragonot, 1887)
- Pempeliella aurorella (Christoph, 1867)
- Pempeliella bayassensis Leraut, 2001
- Pempeliella enderleini (Rebel, 1934)
- Pempeliella lecerfella (D. Lucas, 1933
- Pempeliella macedoniella Ragonot, 1887
- Pempeliella malacella Staudinger, 1870
- Pempeliella matilella Leraut, 2001
- Pempeliella ornatella (Denis & Schiffermüller, 1775)
- Pempeliella sororculella Ragonot, 1887
- Pempeliella sororiella (Zeller, 1839)
