= Dichomeris sutschanellus =

Scientific classification
- Domain: Eukaryota
- Kingdom: Animalia
- Phylum: Arthropoda
- Class: Insecta
- Order: Lepidoptera
- Family: Gelechiidae
- Genus: Dichomeris
- Species: D. sutschanellus

Binomial name
- Dichomeris sutschanellus (Caradja, 1926)

Synonyms
- Hypsolophus sutschanellus Caradja, 1926

Species of moth

Dichomeris sutschanellus is a moth in the family Gelechiidae. It was described by Aristide Caradja in 1926. It is found in Amur in the Russian Far East.
