= Lecithocera sikkimella =

Scientific classification
- Domain: Eukaryota
- Kingdom: Animalia
- Phylum: Arthropoda
- Class: Insecta
- Order: Lepidoptera
- Family: Lecithoceridae
- Genus: Lecithocera
- Species: L. sikkimella

Binomial name
- Lecithocera sikkimella (Caradja, 1920)

Synonyms
- Mystax sikkimella Caradja, 1920

Species of moth in genus Lecithocera

Lecithocera sikkimella is a moth in the family Lecithoceridae. It was described by Aristide Caradja in 1920. It is found in Sikkim, India.
