= Chrysoteuchia dentatella =

Scientific classification
- Kingdom: Animalia
- Phylum: Arthropoda
- Clade: Pancrustacea
- Class: Insecta
- Order: Lepidoptera
- Family: Crambidae
- Genus: Chrysoteuchia
- Species: C. dentatella

Binomial name
- Chrysoteuchia dentatella Song & Chen in Chen, Song & Yuan, 2001

Species of moth

Chrysoteuchia dentatella is a moth in the family Crambidae. It was described by Shi-Mei Song and Tie-Mei Chen in 2001. It is found in Gansu, China.
