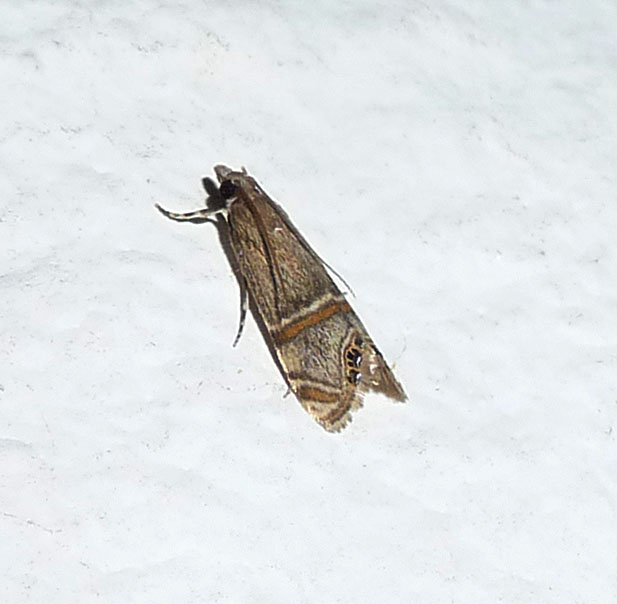

Scientific classification
- Kingdom: Animalia
- Phylum: Arthropoda
- Clade: Pancrustacea
- Class: Insecta
- Order: Lepidoptera
- Family: Crambidae
- Subfamily: Crambinae
- Tribe: Euchromiusini
- Genus: Euchromius
- Species: E. vinculellus

Binomial name
- Euchromius vinculellus (Zeller, 1847)

Synonyms
- Crambus vinculellus Zeller, 1847; Eromene bahrlutella Amsel, 1949; Eromene joiceyella Schmidt, 1934; Ommatopteryx asbenicola Rothschild, 1921; Ommatopteryx corsicalis Hampson, 1919

= Euchromius vinculellus =

Species of moth

Euchromius vinculellus is a species of moth in the family Crambidae. It is found from France, Spain, Portugal, Italy, Greece and Morocco east to Saudi Arabia, Oman and Afghanistan. It is also found in Niger and Kenya.

The length of the forewings is 13–21 mm. Adults are on wing in July (Niger) and January (Kenya).
