= Euchromius malekalis =

Scientific classification
- Kingdom: Animalia
- Phylum: Arthropoda
- Clade: Pancrustacea
- Class: Insecta
- Order: Lepidoptera
- Family: Crambidae
- Subfamily: Crambinae
- Tribe: Euchromiusini
- Genus: Euchromius
- Species: E. malekalis

Binomial name
- Euchromius malekalis Amsel, 1961

Species of moth

Euchromius malekalis is a moth in the family Crambidae. It was described by Hans Georg Amsel in 1961. It is found in Iran and Jordan.
