= Euchromius sudanellus =

Scientific classification
- Kingdom: Animalia
- Phylum: Arthropoda
- Clade: Pancrustacea
- Class: Insecta
- Order: Lepidoptera
- Family: Crambidae
- Subfamily: Crambinae
- Tribe: Euchromiusini
- Genus: Euchromius
- Species: E. sudanellus

Binomial name
- Euchromius sudanellus Błeszyński, 1965

Species of moth

Euchromius sudanellus is a moth in the family Crambidae. It was described by Stanisław Błeszyński in 1965. It is found in Sudan.
