= Euchromius gnathosellus =

Scientific classification
- Kingdom: Animalia
- Phylum: Arthropoda
- Clade: Pancrustacea
- Class: Insecta
- Order: Lepidoptera
- Family: Crambidae
- Subfamily: Crambinae
- Tribe: Euchromiusini
- Genus: Euchromius
- Species: E. gnathosellus

Binomial name
- Euchromius gnathosellus Schouten, 1988

Species of moth

Euchromius gnathosellus is a species of moth in the family Crambidae. It is found from west to central Africa, including Senegal, Sierra Leone, Ivory Coast, Ghana, Togo, Nigeria and the Central African Republic. The habitat consists mainly of plantation areas mixed with pockets of secondary forest.

The length of the forewings is 14–20 mm. Adults are on wing from October to the beginning of December with a peak in the last two weeks of November.
