= Chrysoteuchia moriokensis =

Scientific classification
- Domain: Eukaryota
- Kingdom: Animalia
- Phylum: Arthropoda
- Class: Insecta
- Order: Lepidoptera
- Family: Crambidae
- Genus: Chrysoteuchia
- Species: C. moriokensis

Binomial name
- Chrysoteuchia moriokensis (Okano, 1958)

Synonyms
- Crambus moriokensis Okano, 1958

Species of moth

Chrysoteuchia moriokensis is a moth in the family Crambidae. It was described by Okano in 1958. It is found in Japan (Honshu).
