= Pempeliella lecerfella =

Scientific classification
- Domain: Eukaryota
- Kingdom: Animalia
- Phylum: Arthropoda
- Class: Insecta
- Order: Lepidoptera
- Family: Pyralidae
- Genus: Pempeliella
- Species: P. lecerfella

Binomial name
- Pempeliella lecerfella (D. Lucas, 1933)

Synonyms
- Salebria lecerfella D. Lucas, 1933

Species of moth

Pempeliella lecerfella is a species of snout moth. It is found in North Africa, including Morocco.
