= Euchromius micralis =

Scientific classification
- Kingdom: Animalia
- Phylum: Arthropoda
- Clade: Pancrustacea
- Class: Insecta
- Order: Lepidoptera
- Family: Crambidae
- Subfamily: Crambinae
- Tribe: Euchromiusini
- Genus: Euchromius
- Species: E. micralis

Binomial name
- Euchromius micralis (Hampson, 1919)

Synonyms
- Ommatopteryx micralis Hampson, 1919

Species of moth

Euchromius micralis is a moth in the family Crambidae. It was described by George Hampson in 1919. It is found in the Philippines.
