= Chrysoteuchia hamatella =

Scientific classification
- Kingdom: Animalia
- Phylum: Arthropoda
- Clade: Pancrustacea
- Class: Insecta
- Order: Lepidoptera
- Family: Crambidae
- Genus: Chrysoteuchia
- Species: C. hamatella

Binomial name
- Chrysoteuchia hamatella Chen, Song & Yuan, 2001

Species of moth

Chrysoteuchia hamatella is a moth in the family Crambidae. It was described by Tie-Mei Chen, Shi-Mei Song and De-Cheng Yuan in 2001. It is found in Xizang, China.
