= Euchromius cornus =

Scientific classification
- Kingdom: Animalia
- Phylum: Arthropoda
- Clade: Pancrustacea
- Class: Insecta
- Order: Lepidoptera
- Family: Crambidae
- Subfamily: Crambinae
- Tribe: Euchromiusini
- Genus: Euchromius
- Species: E. cornus

Binomial name
- Euchromius cornus Schouten, 1990

Species of moth

Euchromius cornus is a moth in the family Crambidae. It was described by Schouten in 1990. It is found in Australia, where it has been recorded from most provinces, including Western Australia.
