= Euchromius hampsoni =

Scientific classification
- Kingdom: Animalia
- Phylum: Arthropoda
- Clade: Pancrustacea
- Class: Insecta
- Order: Lepidoptera
- Family: Crambidae
- Subfamily: Crambinae
- Tribe: Euchromiusini
- Genus: Euchromius
- Species: E. hampsoni

Binomial name
- Euchromius hampsoni (Rothschild, 1921)

Synonyms
- Ommatopteryx hampsoni Rothschild, 1921

Species of moth

Euchromius hampsoni is a species of moth in the family Crambidae. It is found in Niger.

The length of the forewings is about 14 mm. Adults have been recorded in July.
