= Chrysoteuchia daisetsuzana =

Scientific classification
- Kingdom: Animalia
- Phylum: Arthropoda
- Clade: Pancrustacea
- Class: Insecta
- Order: Lepidoptera
- Family: Crambidae
- Genus: Chrysoteuchia
- Species: C. daisetsuzana

Binomial name
- Chrysoteuchia daisetsuzana (Matsumura, 1927)

Synonyms
- Crambus daisetsuzana Matsumura, 1927

Species of moth

Chrysoteuchia daisetsuzana is a moth in the family Crambidae. It was described by Shōnen Matsumura in 1927. It is found on the Japanese island of Hokkaido and in Russia.
