= Chrysoteuchia nonifasciaria =

Scientific classification
- Domain: Eukaryota
- Kingdom: Animalia
- Phylum: Arthropoda
- Class: Insecta
- Order: Lepidoptera
- Family: Crambidae
- Genus: Chrysoteuchia
- Species: C. nonifasciaria

Binomial name
- Chrysoteuchia nonifasciaria H.-H. Li & W.-C. Li, 2010

Species of moth

Chrysoteuchia nonifasciaria is a moth in the family Crambidae. It was described by Hou-Hun Li and Wei-Chun Li in 2010. It is found in Xizang, China.
