= Pempeliella malacella =

Scientific classification
- Domain: Eukaryota
- Kingdom: Animalia
- Phylum: Arthropoda
- Class: Insecta
- Order: Lepidoptera
- Family: Pyralidae
- Genus: Pempeliella
- Species: P. malacella

Binomial name
- Pempeliella malacella (Staudinger, 1870)

Synonyms
- Pempelia malacella Staudinger, 1870; Pseudosyria gracilis Rebel, 1927; Pempelia malacella var. punctigerella Chrétien, 1911

Species of moth

Pempeliella malacella is a species of snout moth. It is found in Spain, North Africa (including Tunisia) and the United Arab Emirates.
