= Chrysoteuchia disasterella =

Scientific classification
- Domain: Eukaryota
- Kingdom: Animalia
- Phylum: Arthropoda
- Class: Insecta
- Order: Lepidoptera
- Family: Crambidae
- Genus: Chrysoteuchia
- Species: C. disasterella

Binomial name
- Chrysoteuchia disasterella Błeszyński, 1965

Species of moth

Chrysoteuchia disasterella is a moth in the family Crambidae. It was described by Stanisław Błeszyński in 1965. It is found in Shaanxi, China.
