= Euchromius bleszynskii =

Scientific classification
- Kingdom: Animalia
- Phylum: Arthropoda
- Clade: Pancrustacea
- Class: Insecta
- Order: Lepidoptera
- Family: Crambidae
- Subfamily: Crambinae
- Tribe: Euchromiusini
- Genus: Euchromius
- Species: E. bleszynskii

Binomial name
- Euchromius bleszynskii Roesler, 1975

Species of moth

Euchromius bleszynskii is a moth in the family Crambidae. It was described by Roesler in 1975. It is found in Mongolia.
