= Euchromius zephyrus =

Scientific classification
- Kingdom: Animalia
- Phylum: Arthropoda
- Clade: Pancrustacea
- Class: Insecta
- Order: Lepidoptera
- Family: Crambidae
- Subfamily: Crambinae
- Tribe: Euchromiusini
- Genus: Euchromius
- Species: E. zephyrus

Binomial name
- Euchromius zephyrus Bleszynski, 1962

Species of moth

Euchromius zephyrus is a species of moth in the family Crambidae. It is found in Senegal, Mali, Côte d'Ivoire, Ghana and Nigeria.

The length of the forewings is 16–18 mm.
