= Euchromius nigrobasalis =

Scientific classification
- Kingdom: Animalia
- Phylum: Arthropoda
- Clade: Pancrustacea
- Class: Insecta
- Order: Lepidoptera
- Family: Crambidae
- Subfamily: Crambinae
- Tribe: Euchromiusini
- Genus: Euchromius
- Species: E. nigrobasalis

Binomial name
- Euchromius nigrobasalis Schouten, 1988

Species of moth

Euchromius nigrobasalis is a species of moth in the family Crambidae. It is found in Zimbabwe and South Africa.

The length of the forewings is 12–16 mm. Adults have been recorded in October and November.
