= Lamprophaia albifimbrialis =

Scientific classification
- Kingdom: Animalia
- Phylum: Arthropoda
- Class: Insecta
- Order: Lepidoptera
- Family: Crambidae
- Genus: Lamprophaia
- Species: L. albifimbrialis

Binomial name
- Lamprophaia albifimbrialis (Walker, 1866)

Synonyms
- Botys albifimbrialis Walker, 1866

Species of moth

Lamprophaia albifimbrialis is a moth in the family Crambidae. It was described by Francis Walker in 1866. It is found on Java.
