= Eumorphobotys =

Scientific classification
- Kingdom: Animalia
- Phylum: Arthropoda
- Clade: Pancrustacea
- Class: Insecta
- Order: Lepidoptera
- Family: Crambidae
- Subfamily: Pyraustinae
- Genus: Eumorphobotys; Munroe & Mutuura, 1969

Genus of moths

Eumorphobotys is a genus of moths of the family Crambidae.

== Species ==
- Eumorphobotys concavuncus (Chen & Zhang, 2018)
- Eumorphobotys eumorphalis (Caradja, 1925)
- Eumorphobotys horakae (Chen & Zhang, 2018)
- Eumorphobotys obscuralis (Caradja, 1925)
