= Euchromius viettei =

Scientific classification
- Kingdom: Animalia
- Phylum: Arthropoda
- Clade: Pancrustacea
- Class: Insecta
- Order: Lepidoptera
- Family: Crambidae
- Subfamily: Crambinae
- Tribe: Euchromiusini
- Genus: Euchromius
- Species: E. viettei

Binomial name
- Euchromius viettei Bleszynski, 1961

Synonyms
- Euchromius karsholti Ganev, 1987

Species of moth

Euchromius viettei is a species of moth in the family Crambidae. It is found in the desert belt from Chad to Oman.

The length of the forewings is about 14 mm.
