= Hoeneodes =

Scientific classification
- Domain: Eukaryota
- Kingdom: Animalia
- Phylum: Arthropoda
- Class: Insecta
- Order: Lepidoptera
- Family: Pyralidae
- Subfamily: Phycitinae
- Genus: Hoeneodes; Roesler, 1969

Genus of moths

Hoeneodes is a genus of snout moths described by Rolf-Ulrich Roesler in 1969.

== Species ==
- Hoeneodes sinensis (Caradja & Meyrick, 1937)
- Hoeneodes vittatella (Ragonot, 1887)
