= Hoeneodes vittatella =

Scientific classification
- Domain: Eukaryota
- Kingdom: Animalia
- Phylum: Arthropoda
- Class: Insecta
- Order: Lepidoptera
- Family: Pyralidae
- Genus: Hoeneodes
- Species: H. vittatella

Binomial name
- Hoeneodes vittatella (Ragonot, 1887)

Synonyms
- Psorosa vittatella Ragonot, 1887; Ancylosis vittatella

Species of moth

Hoeneodes vittatella is a species of snout moth in the genus Hoeneodes. It was described by Émile Louis Ragonot in 1887. It is found in Siberia.
