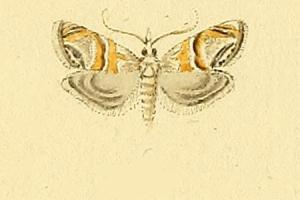

Scientific classification
- Kingdom: Animalia
- Phylum: Arthropoda
- Clade: Pancrustacea
- Class: Insecta
- Order: Lepidoptera
- Family: Crambidae
- Genus: Euchromius
- Species: E. bella

Binomial name
- Euchromius bella (Hubner, 1796)

Synonyms
- Tinea bella Hubner, 1796

= Euchromius bella =

Species of moth

Euchromius bella is a species of moth in the family Crambidae. It is found in France, Spain, Italy, Croatia, Bosnia and Herzegovina, Hungary, Slovakia, Poland, Romania, Bulgaria, the Republic of Macedonia, Greece, Ukraine, Russia and Turkey.

The wingspan is about 17 mm.
