= Pempeliella alibotuschella =

Scientific classification
- Domain: Eukaryota
- Kingdom: Animalia
- Phylum: Arthropoda
- Class: Insecta
- Order: Lepidoptera
- Family: Pyralidae
- Genus: Pempeliella
- Species: P. alibotuschella

Binomial name
- Pempeliella alibotuschella (Drenowski, 1932)

Synonyms
- Pempelia alibotuschella Drenowski, 1932

Species of moth

Pempeliella alibotuschella is a species of snout moth described by Alexander Kirilow Drenowski in 1932. It is found in Bulgaria.
