= Epiparbattia oligotricha =

Scientific classification
- Domain: Eukaryota
- Kingdom: Animalia
- Phylum: Arthropoda
- Class: Insecta
- Order: Lepidoptera
- Family: Crambidae
- Genus: Epiparbattia
- Species: E. oligotricha

Binomial name
- Epiparbattia oligotricha Zhang & Li in Zhang & Li, 2005

Species of moth

Epiparbattia oligotricha is a moth in the family Crambidae. It was described by Zhang and Li in 2005. It is found in China (Guizhou).
