= Chrysoteuchia picturatellus =

Scientific classification
- Domain: Eukaryota
- Kingdom: Animalia
- Phylum: Arthropoda
- Class: Insecta
- Order: Lepidoptera
- Family: Crambidae
- Genus: Chrysoteuchia
- Species: C. picturatellus

Binomial name
- Chrysoteuchia picturatellus (South in Leech & South, 1901)

Synonyms
- Crambus picturatellus South in Leech & South, 1901

Species of moth

Chrysoteuchia picturatellus is a moth in the family Crambidae. It was described by South in 1901. It is found in China (Sichuan) and Russia.
