= Chrysoteuchia dividellus =

Scientific classification
- Kingdom: Animalia
- Phylum: Arthropoda
- Class: Insecta
- Order: Lepidoptera
- Family: Crambidae
- Genus: Chrysoteuchia
- Species: C. dividellus

Binomial name
- Chrysoteuchia dividellus (Snellen, 1890)

Synonyms
- Crambus dividellus Snellen, 1890

Species of moth

Chrysoteuchia dividellus is a moth in the family Crambidae. It was described by Snellen in 1890. It is found in India (Sikkim).
