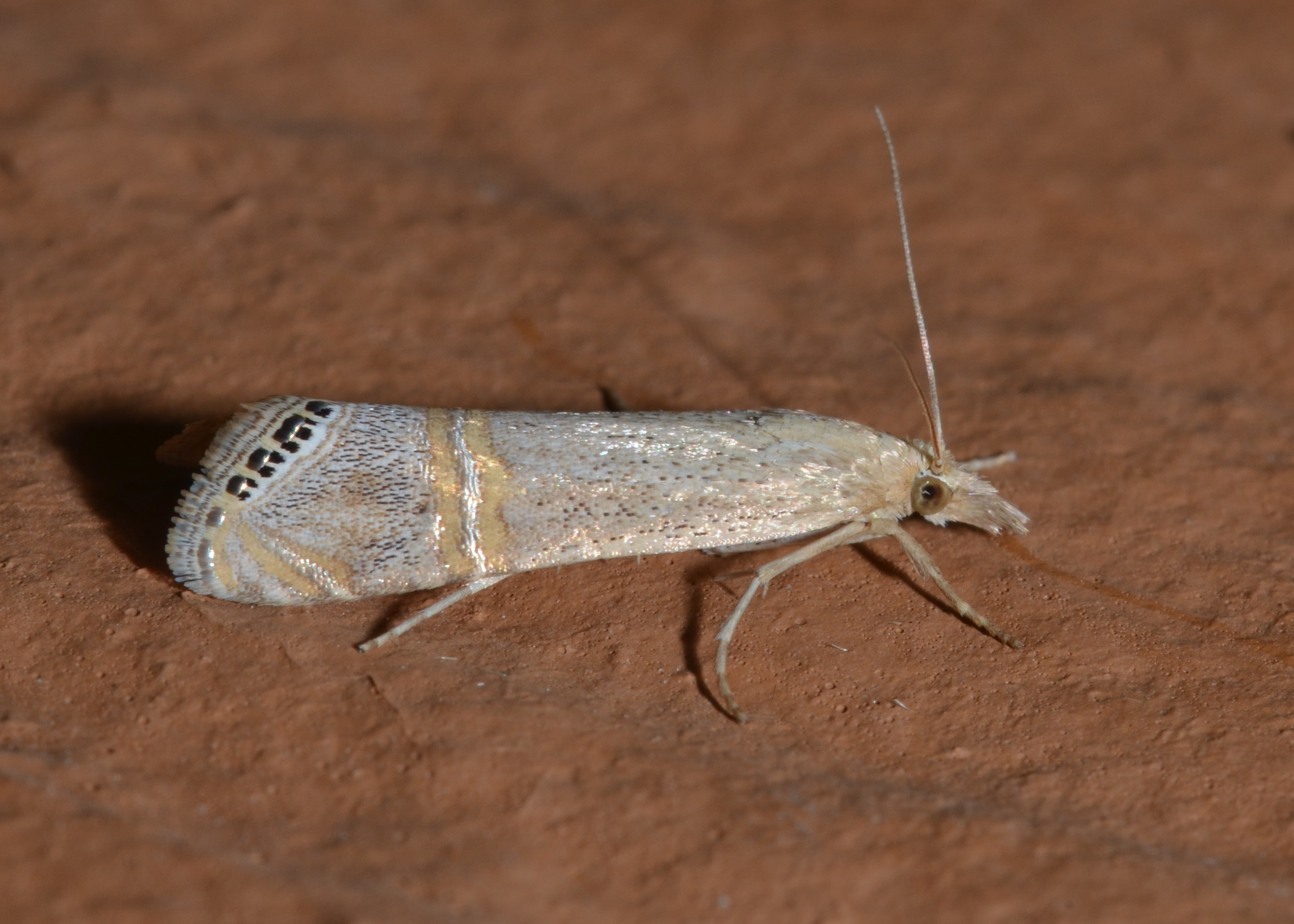

Scientific classification
- Kingdom: Animalia
- Phylum: Arthropoda
- Clade: Pancrustacea
- Class: Insecta
- Order: Lepidoptera
- Family: Crambidae
- Subfamily: Crambinae
- Tribe: Euchromiusini
- Genus: Euchromius
- Species: E. ocellea

Binomial name
- Euchromius ocellea (Haworth, 1811)

Synonyms
- Euchromius ocelleus (Haworth, 1811); Palparia ocelleus Haworth, 1811; Crambus cyrilli Costa, 1829; Phycis funiculella Treitschke, 1832; Eromene texana Robinson, 1870; Eromene gigantea Turati, 1924; Pseudoancylolomia qadrii Ahmad, Zaidi & Kamaluddin, 1982

= Euchromius ocellea =

Species of moth

Euchromius ocellea, the necklace veneer or belted grass-veneer, is a cosmopolitan migratory species of moth of the family Crambidae, first described by Adrian Hardy Haworth in 1811. It has Hodges number 5454.

== Distribution ==
The species has a cosmopolitan distribution. It is widespread in tropical and subtropical regions, while it is a rare migrant in some other parts of its range, such as the UK and the Netherlands.

== Description and biology ==
=== Larva ===
Larvae of Euchromius ocellea have a white body with amber pinacula and a pale amber head, and grow to a length of 18–20 mm. They feed on maize (Zea mays) and sorghum (Sorghum bicolor).

=== Imago ===
Euchromius ocellea has a wingspan of 13–27 mm. The ground colour of the forewings was given by Schouten as creamy white with a dense suffusion of ochreous to dark brown scales; while Goater described it as pale greyish ochreous. The forewings have a number of markings, including two medial bands, a subterminal line, a white patch near the terminal area, and a number of black dots in the terminal area. Goater additionally mentions fine silver streaking on the entire wing; golden metallic spots near the black terminal dots; and, in male specimens, a semi-transparent patch on the basal side of the cell. Schouten makes mention of a yellowish spot in the posterior area in some specimens. The fringe is white with two lines, either brown or black.

In southern Africa, adults are on wing from October to April. In eastern Africa there seem to be two flight periods with adults on wing from November to February and again from June to July. In western Africa the flight period ranges from November to March.
