= Chrysoteuchia gonoxes =

Scientific classification
- Domain: Eukaryota
- Kingdom: Animalia
- Phylum: Arthropoda
- Class: Insecta
- Order: Lepidoptera
- Family: Crambidae
- Genus: Chrysoteuchia
- Species: C. gonoxes

Binomial name
- Chrysoteuchia gonoxes (Błeszyński, 1962)

Synonyms
- Crambus gonoxes Błeszyński, 1962

Species of moth

Chrysoteuchia gonoxes is a moth in the family Crambidae. It was described by Stanisław Błeszyński in 1962. It is found in Myanmar.
