= Pempeliella macedoniella =

Scientific classification
- Domain: Eukaryota
- Kingdom: Animalia
- Phylum: Arthropoda
- Class: Insecta
- Order: Lepidoptera
- Family: Pyralidae
- Genus: Pempeliella
- Species: P. macedoniella

Binomial name
- Pempeliella macedoniella (Ragonot, 1887)

Synonyms
- Pempelia macedoniella Ragonot, 1887

Species of moth

Pempeliella macedoniella is a species of snout moth. It is found in North Macedonia.

The wingspan is about 12 mm.
