= Pempeliella aurorella =

Scientific classification
- Domain: Eukaryota
- Kingdom: Animalia
- Phylum: Arthropoda
- Class: Insecta
- Order: Lepidoptera
- Family: Pyralidae
- Genus: Pempeliella
- Species: P. aurorella

Binomial name
- Pempeliella aurorella (Christoph, 1867)

Synonyms
- Myelois aurorella Christoph, 1867

Species of moth

Pempeliella aurorella is a species of snout moth. It is found in Russia.

The wingspan is about 23 mm.
