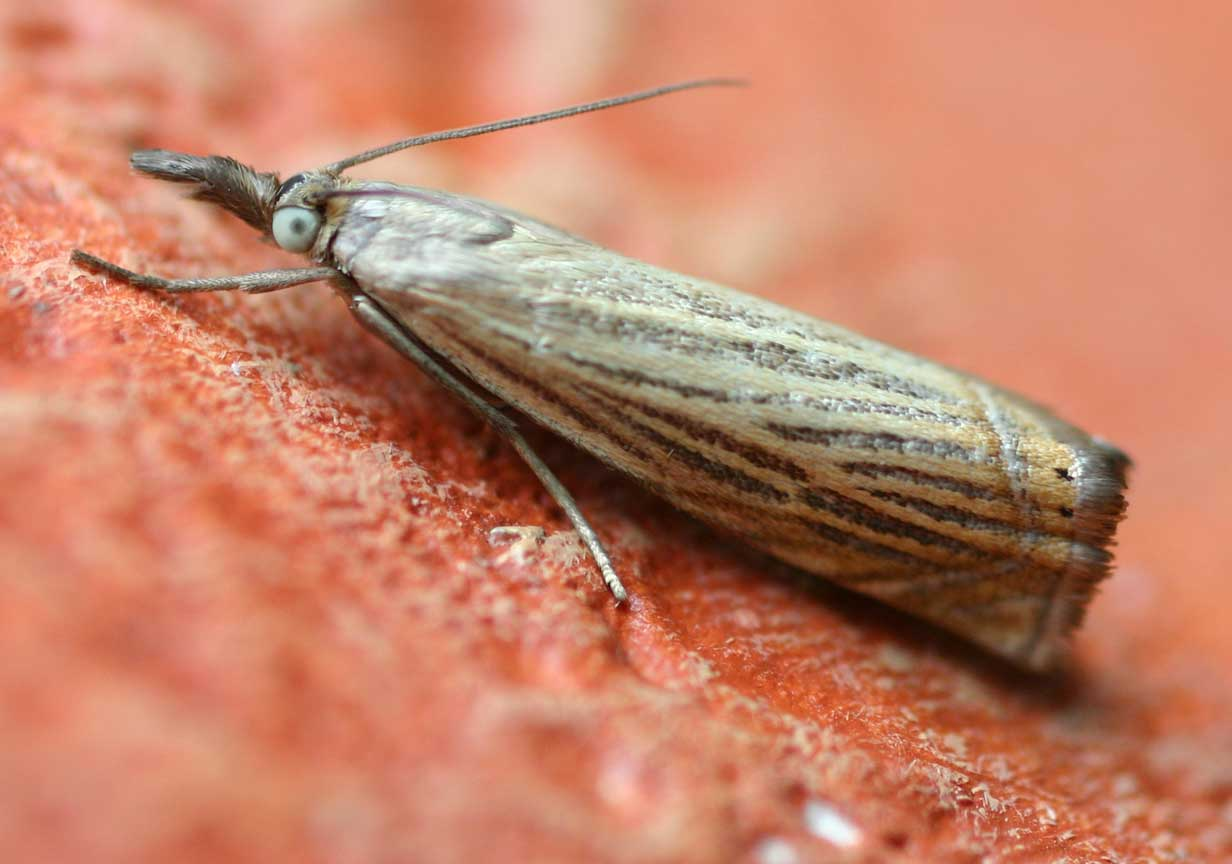

Scientific classification
- Kingdom: Animalia
- Phylum: Arthropoda
- Class: Insecta
- Order: Lepidoptera
- Family: Crambidae
- Genus: Chrysoteuchia
- Species: C. culmella

Binomial name
- Chrysoteuchia culmella (Linnaeus, 1758)

Synonyms
- Phalaena (Tinea) culmella Linnaeus, 1758; Chrysoteuchia hrysoteuchia caricetalis (Hübner, 1825); Chrysoteuchia culmella montanellus (Stephens, 1834); Crambus cespitellus ab. brunnea Dufrane, 1942; Crambus hortibius Strand, 1920; Crambus hortuellus var. minimus Strand, 1900; Tinea cespitella Hübner, 1796; Palparia cespitea Haworth, 1811; Chrysoteuchia culmella sebdoui (Bleszynski, 1962); Tinea hortella Fabricius, 1794; Tinea hortuella Hübner, 1796; Tinea hortalis Hübner, 1825; Palparia hortuea Haworth, 1811; Tinea strigella Fabricius, 1781; Tinea strigatus Fabricius, 1798; Chrysoteuchia culmella uralellus (Krulikovsky, 1909); Chrysoteuchia culmella ussuriellus (Bleszynski, 1962)

= Chrysoteuchia culmella =

Species of moth

Chrysoteuchia culmella, the garden grass-veneer, is a species of moth of the family Crambidae. It was first described by Carl Linnaeus in his 1758 10th edition of Systema Naturae. It is found in Europe.

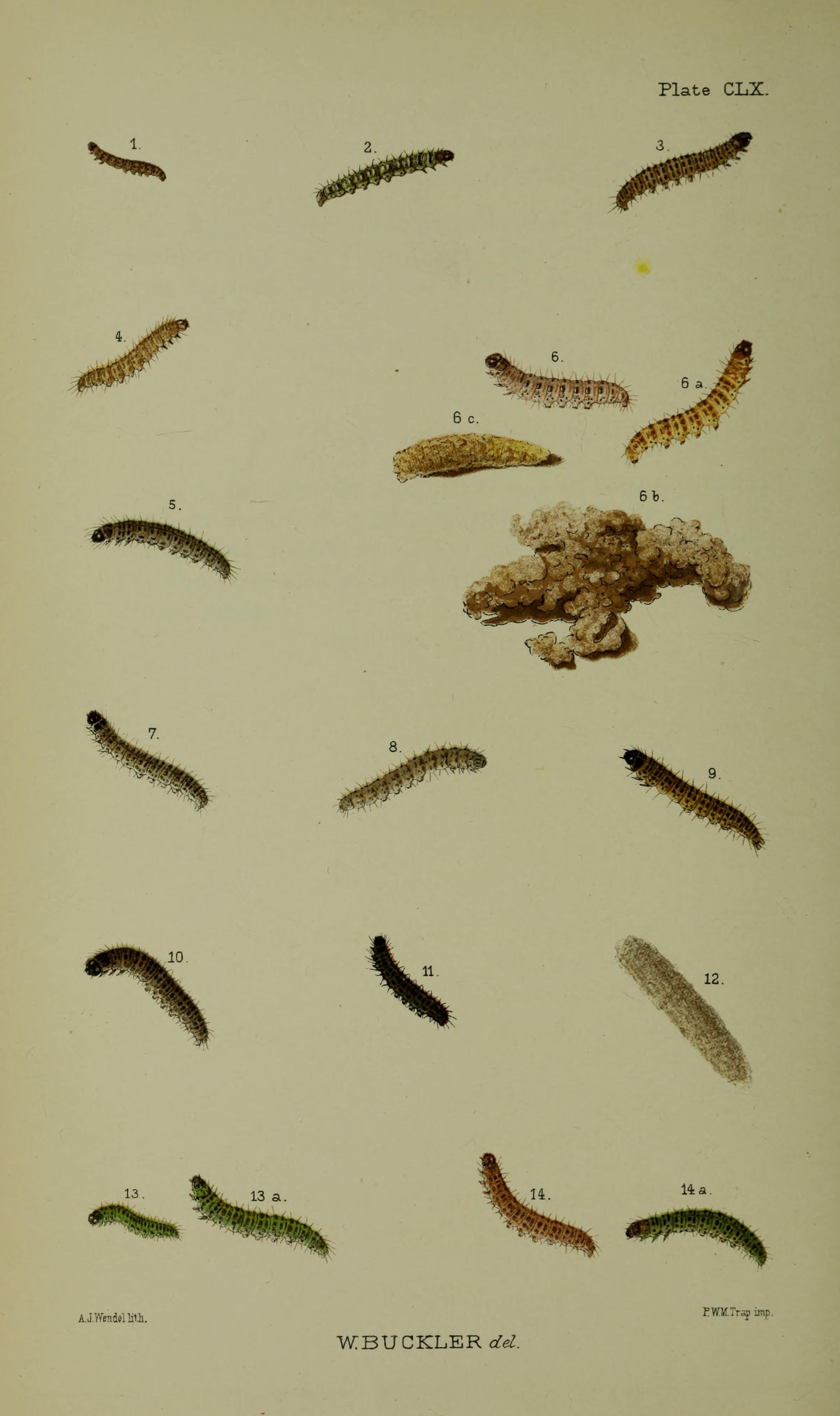
Fig. 4 larva after final moult

The wingspan is 18–24 mm. The forewings are brown; a whitish median streak, ending in branches along veins 2-5, often separated by dark fuscous scales; dorsal 2/3 often wholly suffused with whitish-ochreous; a terminal series of black dots; cilia metallic. Hindwings are rather dark grey. The larva is pale pinkish-ochreous; spots brown; head and plate of 2 brown, darker- marked. See also Parsons et al.

The moth flies from June to July depending on the location.

The larvae feed on various grasses.
