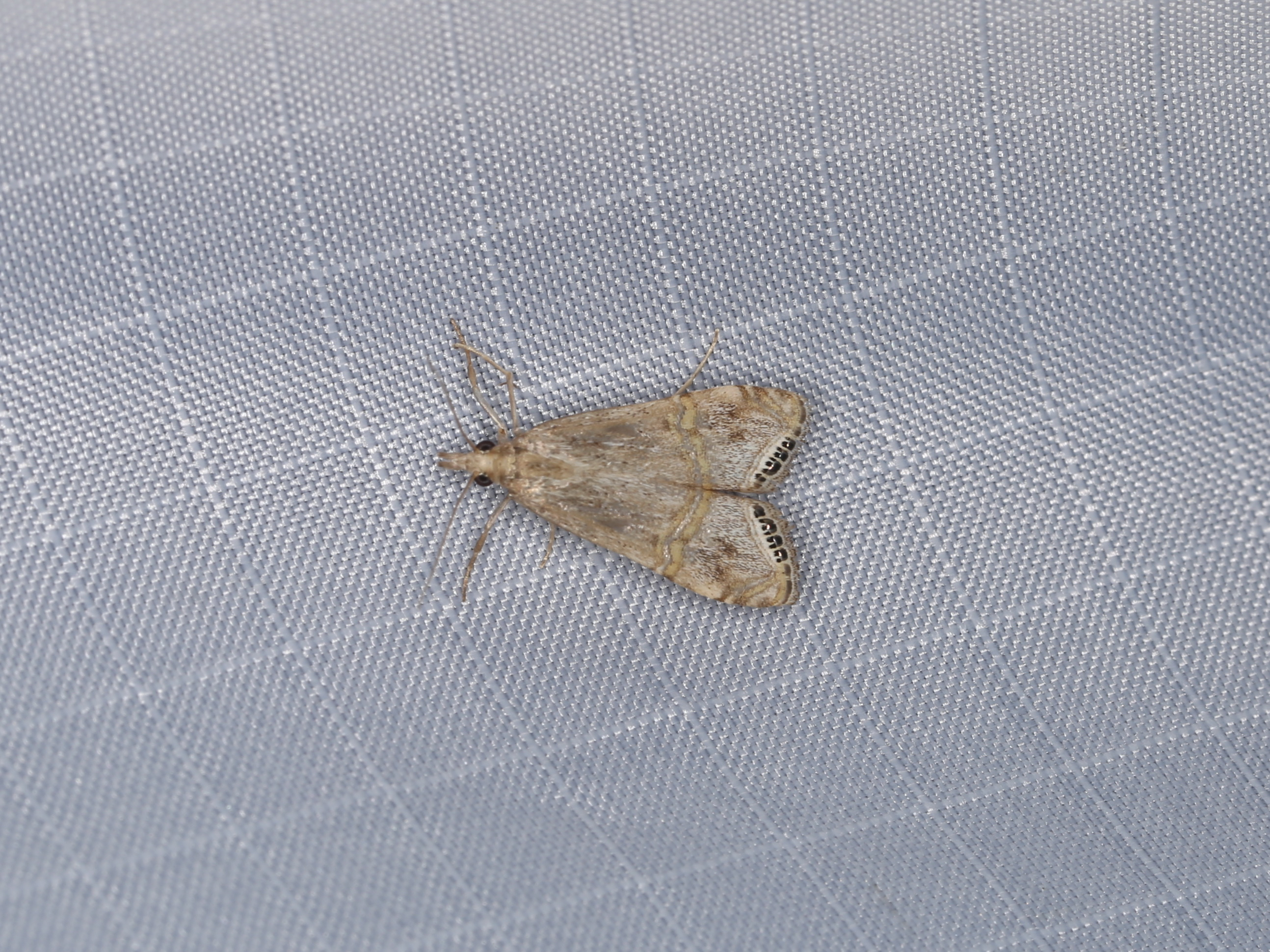

Scientific classification
- Kingdom: Animalia
- Phylum: Arthropoda
- Clade: Pancrustacea
- Class: Insecta
- Order: Lepidoptera
- Family: Crambidae
- Subfamily: Crambinae
- Tribe: Euchromiusini
- Genus: Euchromius
- Species: E. californicalis

Binomial name
- Euchromius californicalis (Packard, 1873)

Synonyms
- Eromene californicalis Packard, 1873

= Euchromius californicalis =

Species of moth

Euchromius californicalis, the California grass-veneer, is a moth in the family Crambidae. It was described by Alpheus Spring Packard in 1873. It is found in North America, where it has been recorded from British Columbia, Alberta, Washington, Idaho, Montana, North Dakota, South Dakota, Oregon, Wyoming, California, Nevada, Utah, Colorado and New Mexico. The habitat consists of grasslands.

The wingspan is 20–23 mm for males and 14–22 mm for females. The forewings are light brown with two yellow transverse lines. Adults are on wing from May to August.
