= Pempeliella ardosiella =

Scientific classification
- Domain: Eukaryota
- Kingdom: Animalia
- Phylum: Arthropoda
- Class: Insecta
- Order: Lepidoptera
- Family: Pyralidae
- Genus: Pempeliella
- Species: P. ardosiella

Binomial name
- Pempeliella ardosiella (Ragonot, 1887)

Synonyms
- Pempelia ardosiella Ragonot, 1887; Pempeliella ardosiella venturiella P. Leraut, 2001

Species of moth

Pempeliella ardosiella is a species of snout moth. It is found in France and Spain.

The wingspan is about 20 mm.
