= Chrysoteuchia diplogrammus =

Scientific classification
- Kingdom: Animalia
- Phylum: Arthropoda
- Clade: Pancrustacea
- Class: Insecta
- Order: Lepidoptera
- Family: Crambidae
- Genus: Chrysoteuchia
- Species: C. diplogrammus

Binomial name
- Chrysoteuchia diplogrammus (Zeller, 1863)

Synonyms
- Crambus diplogrammus Zeller, 1863; Crambus textellus Christoph, 1881

Species of moth

Chrysoteuchia diplogrammus is a moth in the family Crambidae. It was described by Zeller in 1863. It is found in Japan and the Russian Far East (Ussuri).
