= Euchromius anapiellus =

Scientific classification
- Kingdom: Animalia
- Phylum: Arthropoda
- Clade: Pancrustacea
- Class: Insecta
- Order: Lepidoptera
- Family: Crambidae
- Subfamily: Crambinae
- Tribe: Euchromiusini
- Genus: Euchromius
- Species: E. anapiellus

Binomial name
- Euchromius anapiellus (Zeller, 1847)

Synonyms
- Crambus anapiellus Zeller, 1847

Species of moth

Euchromius anapiellus is a species of moth in the family Crambidae described by Philipp Christoph Zeller in 1847. It is found in France, Spain, Portugal, Italy, on Sardinia and Sicily, Tunisia, Morocco and Algeria. It has also been recorded from Turkey.
