= Euchromius tanalis =

Scientific classification
- Kingdom: Animalia
- Phylum: Arthropoda
- Clade: Pancrustacea
- Class: Insecta
- Order: Lepidoptera
- Family: Crambidae
- Subfamily: Crambinae
- Tribe: Euchromiusini
- Genus: Euchromius
- Species: E. tanalis

Binomial name
- Euchromius tanalis Schouten, 1988

Species of moth

Euchromius tanalis is a species of moth in the family Crambidae. It is found in the mountainous areas of Kenya and Ethiopia. The habitat consists of montane vegetation zones at altitudes ranging from about 1,200 to 3,250 meters.

The length of the forewings is 20–24 mm. The groundcolour of the forewings is creamy white, densely suffused with ochreous to dark brown scales. The hindwings are creamy white to light brown with a darkly bordered termen. In Ethiopia adults have been recorded in October. In Kenya, adults were found on wing in January, May and June.
