= Chrysoteuchia mandschuricus =

Scientific classification
- Domain: Eukaryota
- Kingdom: Animalia
- Phylum: Arthropoda
- Class: Insecta
- Order: Lepidoptera
- Family: Crambidae
- Genus: Chrysoteuchia
- Species: C. mandschuricus

Binomial name
- Chrysoteuchia mandschuricus (Christoph, 1881)

Synonyms
- Crambus mandschuricus Christoph, 1881

Species of moth

Chrysoteuchia mandschuricus is a moth in the family Crambidae. It was described by Hugo Theodor Christoph in 1881. It is found in Russia (Amur).
