= Chrysoteuchia pseudodiplogrammus =

Scientific classification
- Domain: Eukaryota
- Kingdom: Animalia
- Phylum: Arthropoda
- Class: Insecta
- Order: Lepidoptera
- Family: Crambidae
- Genus: Chrysoteuchia
- Species: C. pseudodiplogrammus

Binomial name
- Chrysoteuchia pseudodiplogrammus (Okano, 1962)

Synonyms
- Crambus pseudodiplogrammus Okano, 1962

Species of moth

Chrysoteuchia pseudodiplogrammus is a moth in the family Crambidae. It was described by Okano in 1962. It is found in Russia and Japan.
