= Euchromius matador =

Scientific classification
- Kingdom: Animalia
- Phylum: Arthropoda
- Clade: Pancrustacea
- Class: Insecta
- Order: Lepidoptera
- Family: Crambidae
- Subfamily: Crambinae
- Tribe: Euchromiusini
- Genus: Euchromius
- Species: E. matador

Binomial name
- Euchromius matador Bleszynski, 1966

Species of moth

Euchromius matador is a species of moth in the family Crambidae. It is found in eastern Zaire and western Tanzania. The habitat consists of moist woodland, savanna areas and montane areas (up to 1,500 meters).

The length of the forewings is 20–24 mm. Adults are on wing from March to June and again from November to December in two generations per year.
