= Elethyia albirufalis =

Scientific classification
- Kingdom: Animalia
- Phylum: Arthropoda
- Class: Insecta
- Order: Lepidoptera
- Family: Crambidae
- Subfamily: Crambinae
- Tribe: incertae sedis
- Genus: Elethyia
- Species: E. albirufalis

Binomial name
- Elethyia albirufalis (Hampson, 1919)

Synonyms
- Prionopteryx albirufalis Hampson, 1919

Species of moth

Elethyia albirufalis is a moth in the family Crambidae. It was described by George Hampson in 1919. It is found in Sudan.
