= Euchromius klimeschi =

Scientific classification
- Kingdom: Animalia
- Phylum: Arthropoda
- Clade: Pancrustacea
- Class: Insecta
- Order: Lepidoptera
- Family: Crambidae
- Subfamily: Crambinae
- Tribe: Euchromiusini
- Genus: Euchromius
- Species: E. klimeschi

Binomial name
- Euchromius klimeschi Bleszynski, 1961

Species of moth

Euchromius klimeschi is a species of moth in the family Crambidae. It is found in Ethiopia, Somalia, Kenya, Tanzania, Zaire, Zambia, Zimbabwe, Madagascar, Mozambique, South Africa and Namibia.

The length of the forewings is 12–15 mm. Adults are on wing from October to December and from February to March. In Somalia, adults have also been recorded in April, May and June.
