= Chrysoteuchia ningensis =

Scientific classification
- Domain: Eukaryota
- Kingdom: Animalia
- Phylum: Arthropoda
- Class: Insecta
- Order: Lepidoptera
- Family: Crambidae
- Genus: Chrysoteuchia
- Species: C. ningensis

Binomial name
- Chrysoteuchia ningensis W.-C. Li, 2012

Species of moth

Chrysoteuchia ningensis is a moth in the family Crambidae. It was described by Wei-Chun Li in 2012. It is found in Ningxia, China.
