= Euchromius discopis =

Scientific classification
- Kingdom: Animalia
- Phylum: Arthropoda
- Clade: Pancrustacea
- Class: Insecta
- Order: Lepidoptera
- Family: Crambidae
- Subfamily: Crambinae
- Tribe: Euchromiusini
- Genus: Euchromius
- Species: E. discopis

Binomial name
- Euchromius discopis (Hampson, 1919)

Synonyms
- Ommatopteryx discopis Hampson, 1919

Species of moth

Euchromius discopis is a species of moth in the family Crambidae. It is found in Zimbabwe, Botswana, South Africa and Namibia. The habitat consists of steppe, dry woodland areas and macchia vegetations up to an altitude of 2,000 meters.

The length of the forewings is 14–16 mm. Adults are on wing from October to April with peaks in October and February.
