= Pempeliella sororculella =

Scientific classification
- Domain: Eukaryota
- Kingdom: Animalia
- Phylum: Arthropoda
- Class: Insecta
- Order: Lepidoptera
- Family: Pyralidae
- Genus: Pempeliella
- Species: P. sororculella

Binomial name
- Pempeliella sororculella (Ragonot, 1887)

Synonyms
- Pempelia sororculella Ragonot, 1887

Species of moth

Pempeliella sororculella is a species of snout moth. It is found in the Republic of Macedonia and Greece.

The wingspan is about 24 mm.
