= Euchromius labellum =

Scientific classification
- Kingdom: Animalia
- Phylum: Arthropoda
- Clade: Pancrustacea
- Class: Insecta
- Order: Lepidoptera
- Family: Crambidae
- Subfamily: Crambinae
- Tribe: Euchromiusini
- Genus: Euchromius
- Species: E. labellum

Binomial name
- Euchromius labellum Schouten, 1988

Species of moth

Euchromius labellum is a species of moth in the family Crambidae. It is found in Kenya.

The length of the forewings is 11–13 mm. Adults are on wing in February and March.
