= Elethyia subscissa =

Scientific classification
- Domain: Eukaryota
- Kingdom: Animalia
- Phylum: Arthropoda
- Class: Insecta
- Order: Lepidoptera
- Family: Crambidae
- Subfamily: Crambinae
- Tribe: incertae sedis
- Genus: Elethyia
- Species: E. subscissa

Binomial name
- Elethyia subscissa (Christoph, 1877)

Synonyms
- Eromene subscissa Christoph, 1877

Species of moth

Elethyia subscissa is a moth in the family Crambidae. It was described by Hugo Theodor Christoph in 1877. It is found in Turkmenistan.
