= Euchromius subcambridgei =

Scientific classification
- Kingdom: Animalia
- Phylum: Arthropoda
- Clade: Pancrustacea
- Class: Insecta
- Order: Lepidoptera
- Family: Crambidae
- Subfamily: Crambinae
- Tribe: Euchromiusini
- Genus: Euchromius
- Species: E. subcambridgei

Binomial name
- Euchromius subcambridgei Błeszyński, 1965

Species of moth

Euchromius subcambridgei is a moth in the family Crambidae. It was described by Stanisław Błeszyński in 1965. It is found in Tunisia and Sudan.
