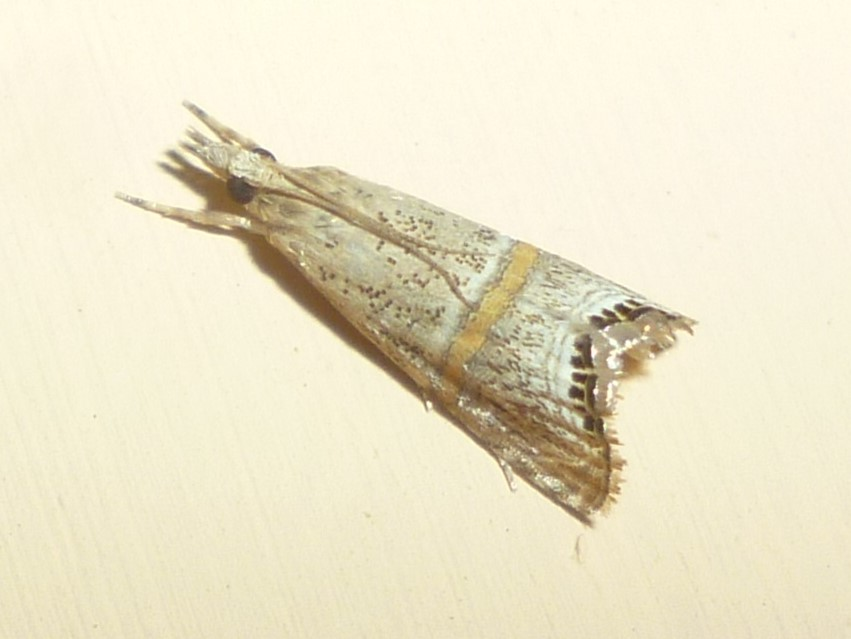

Scientific classification
- Kingdom: Animalia
- Phylum: Arthropoda
- Clade: Pancrustacea
- Class: Insecta
- Order: Lepidoptera
- Family: Crambidae
- Subfamily: Crambinae
- Tribe: Euchromiusini
- Genus: Euchromius
- Species: E. superbellus

Binomial name
- Euchromius superbellus (Zeller, 1849)

Synonyms
- Crambus superbellus Zeller, 1849; Eromene wockeella Zeller, 1863; Eromene wocheella Hampson, 1896; Ommatopteryx cypriusella Amsel, 1958

= Euchromius superbellus =

Species of moth

Euchromius superbellus is a species of moth in the family Crambidae described by Philipp Christoph Zeller in 1849. It is found in France, Spain, Italy, Croatia, Romania, Bulgaria, the Republic of Macedonia, Albania, Greece, Russia, Transcaucasia, Turkey and Armenia.
