= Chrysoteuchia atrosignatus =

Scientific classification
- Kingdom: Animalia
- Phylum: Arthropoda
- Clade: Pancrustacea
- Class: Insecta
- Order: Lepidoptera
- Family: Crambidae
- Genus: Chrysoteuchia
- Species: C. atrosignatus

Binomial name
- Chrysoteuchia atrosignatus (Zeller, 1877)

Synonyms
- Crambus atrosignatus Zeller, 1877; Crambus atrosignellus Caradja, 1938; Crambus niveirostralis Caradja, 1925; Crambus atrosignellus var. niveirostrellus Caradja, 1938

Species of moth

Chrysoteuchia atrosignatus is a moth in the family Crambidae. It was described by Zeller in 1877. It is found in China and Japan.
