= Euchromius limaellus =

Scientific classification
- Kingdom: Animalia
- Phylum: Arthropoda
- Clade: Pancrustacea
- Class: Insecta
- Order: Lepidoptera
- Family: Crambidae
- Subfamily: Crambinae
- Tribe: Euchromiusini
- Genus: Euchromius
- Species: E. limaellus

Binomial name
- Euchromius limaellus Błeszyński, 1967

Species of moth

Euchromius limaellus is a moth in the family Crambidae. It was described by Stanisław Błeszyński in 1967. It is found in Peru.
