= Euchromius mouchai =

Scientific classification
- Kingdom: Animalia
- Phylum: Arthropoda
- Clade: Pancrustacea
- Class: Insecta
- Order: Lepidoptera
- Family: Crambidae
- Subfamily: Crambinae
- Tribe: Euchromiusini
- Genus: Euchromius
- Species: E. mouchai

Binomial name
- Euchromius mouchai Błeszyński, 1961

Species of moth

Euchromius mouchai is a species of moth in the family Crambidae described by Stanisław Błeszyński in 1961. It is found on Corsica and Sicily and in Russia and Turkey.
