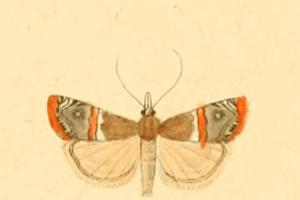

Scientific classification
- Kingdom: Animalia
- Phylum: Arthropoda
- Clade: Pancrustacea
- Class: Insecta
- Order: Lepidoptera
- Family: Crambidae
- Subfamily: Crambinae
- Tribe: Euchromiusini
- Genus: Euchromius
- Species: E. ramburiellus

Binomial name
- Euchromius ramburiellus (Duponchel, 1836)

Synonyms
- Crambus ramburiellus Duponchel, 1836; Crambus zonellus Zeller, 1847; Eromene islamella Amsel, 1949; Eromene ramburiella var. luteella Caradja, 1910

= Euchromius ramburiellus =

Species of moth

Euchromius ramburiellus is a species of moth in the family Crambidae described by Philogène Auguste Joseph Duponchel in 1836. It is found in France, Spain, Portugal, Italy, Croatia, Romania, Bulgaria, Russia, North Africa (including Egypt, Libya, Tunisia, Algeria and Morocco), Afghanistan, Iran, Iraq, Jordan and Israel.

The wingspan is about 17.5 mm.
