= Euchromius mythus =

Scientific classification
- Kingdom: Animalia
- Phylum: Arthropoda
- Clade: Pancrustacea
- Class: Insecta
- Order: Lepidoptera
- Family: Crambidae
- Subfamily: Crambinae
- Tribe: Euchromiusini
- Genus: Euchromius
- Species: E. mythus

Binomial name
- Euchromius mythus Bleszynski, 1970

Species of moth

Euchromius mythus is a species of moth in the family Crambidae. It occurs in most of eastern and southern Africa, including Kenya, Tanzania, Zaire, Malawi, the Comoros, Madagascar, Zimbabwe, Namibia and South Africa. The habitat consists of moist and dry savanna and woodland areas, up to an altitude of 1,000 meters.

The length of the forewings is 13–22 mm. Adults are on wing in March, April and May in most of the range, but also in June (in Tanzania), July (on Madagascar), August (on the Comoros) and September (in Zaire).
