= Elethyia =

Scientific classification
- Domain: Eukaryota
- Kingdom: Animalia
- Phylum: Arthropoda
- Class: Insecta
- Order: Lepidoptera
- Family: Crambidae
- Subfamily: Crambinae
- Tribe: incertae sedis
- Genus: Elethyia; Ragonot in de Joannis & Ragonot, 1889

Genus of moths

Elethyia is a genus of moths of the family Crambidae.

== Species ==
- Elethyia albirufalis (Hampson, 1919)
- Elethyia minerva (Błeszyński, 1965)
- Elethyia subscissa (Christoph, 1877)
- Elethyia taishanensis (Caradja & Meyrick, 1937)
