= Chrysoteuchia pyraustoides =

Scientific classification
- Domain: Eukaryota
- Kingdom: Animalia
- Phylum: Arthropoda
- Class: Insecta
- Order: Lepidoptera
- Family: Crambidae
- Genus: Chrysoteuchia
- Species: C. pyraustoides

Binomial name
- Chrysoteuchia pyraustoides (Erschoff, 1877)

Synonyms
- Catastia pyraustoides Erschoff, 1877

Species of moth

Chrysoteuchia pyraustoides is a moth in the family Crambidae. It was described by Nikolay Grigoryevich Erschoff in 1877. It is found in Irkutsk Oblast, Russia.
