= Chrysoteuchia fuliginosellus =

Scientific classification
- Domain: Eukaryota
- Kingdom: Animalia
- Phylum: Arthropoda
- Class: Insecta
- Order: Lepidoptera
- Family: Crambidae
- Genus: Chrysoteuchia
- Species: C. fuliginosellus

Binomial name
- Chrysoteuchia fuliginosellus (South in Leech & South, 1901)

Synonyms
- Crambus fuliginosellus South in Leech & South, 1901

Species of moth

Chrysoteuchia fuliginosellus is a moth in the family Crambidae. It was described by South in 1901. It is found in Sichuan (China).
