= Euchromius erum =

Scientific classification
- Kingdom: Animalia
- Phylum: Arthropoda
- Clade: Pancrustacea
- Class: Insecta
- Order: Lepidoptera
- Family: Crambidae
- Subfamily: Crambinae
- Tribe: Euchromiusini
- Genus: Euchromius
- Species: E. erum

Binomial name
- Euchromius erum Schouten, 1988

Species of moth

Euchromius erum is a species of moth in the family Crambidae. It is found in Ethiopia and Kenya.

The length of the forewings is about 14 mm. Adults have been recorded in January, February, March and the beginning of April.
