= Euchromius gozmanyi =

Scientific classification
- Kingdom: Animalia
- Phylum: Arthropoda
- Clade: Pancrustacea
- Class: Insecta
- Order: Lepidoptera
- Family: Crambidae
- Subfamily: Crambinae
- Tribe: Euchromiusini
- Genus: Euchromius
- Species: E. gozmanyi

Binomial name
- Euchromius gozmanyi Błeszyński, 1961

Species of moth

Euchromius gozmanyi is a species of moth in the family Crambidae described by Stanisław Błeszyński in 1961. It is found in France, Spain, Portugal, on Sardinia and Sicily and in Tunisia, Algeria and Morocco.

The wingspan is 15–16 mm.
