= Chrysoteuchia porcelanellus =

Scientific classification
- Domain: Eukaryota
- Kingdom: Animalia
- Phylum: Arthropoda
- Class: Insecta
- Order: Lepidoptera
- Family: Crambidae
- Genus: Chrysoteuchia
- Species: C. porcelanellus

Binomial name
- Chrysoteuchia porcelanellus (Motschulsky, 1861)

Synonyms
- Crambus porcelanellus Motschulsky, 1861; Crambus fucatellus Christoph, 1881; Crambus vigens Butler, 1879; Crambus porcellanellus Zeller, 1863; Crambus procellanellus Caradja & Meyrick, 1935

Species of moth

Chrysoteuchia porcelanellus is a moth in the family Crambidae. It was described by Victor Motschulsky in 1861. It is found in Russia and Japan.
