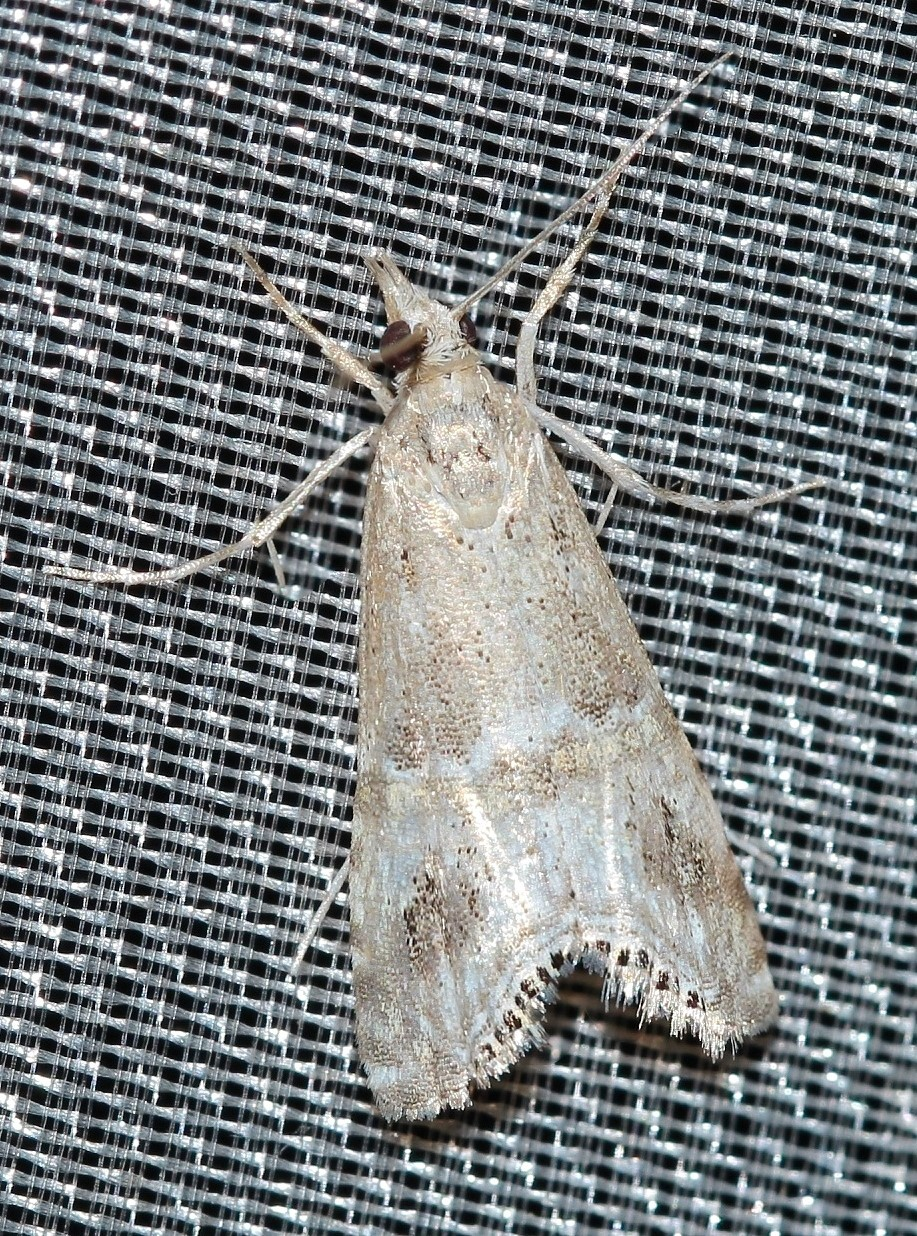

Scientific classification
- Kingdom: Animalia
- Phylum: Arthropoda
- Clade: Pancrustacea
- Class: Insecta
- Order: Lepidoptera
- Family: Crambidae
- Subfamily: Crambinae
- Tribe: Euchromiusini
- Genus: Euchromius
- Species: E. bleszynskiellus

Binomial name
- Euchromius bleszynskiellus Popescu-Gorj, 1964

Synonyms
- Euchromius roxanus Bleszynski, 1965

= Euchromius bleszynskiellus =

Species of moth

Euchromius bleszynskiellus is a species of moth in the family Crambidae. It has been found in Greece, Romania and Russia.

The wingspan is about 17 mm (0.67 in).
