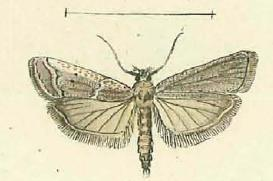

Scientific classification
- Kingdom: Animalia
- Phylum: Arthropoda
- Clade: Pancrustacea
- Class: Insecta
- Order: Lepidoptera
- Family: Pyralidae
- Genus: Pempeliella
- Species: P. sororiella

Binomial name
- Pempeliella sororiella (Zeller, 1839)

Synonyms
- Pempelia sororiella Zeller, 1839; Pempeliella sororiella iranella Roesler, 1969; Pempeliella sororiella klimeschi Roesler, 1969; Pempelia sororiella klimeschi minima Roesler, 1969; Pempelia jucundella Mann, 1864; Pempelia satureiella Millière, 1873; Phycis marilella Guenée, 1845

= Pempeliella sororiella =

Species of moth

Pempeliella sororiella is a species of moth in the family Pyralidae. It is found in southern Europe, Turkey and Iran.

The wingspan is about 20 mm.
