= Euchromius keredjella =

Scientific classification
- Kingdom: Animalia
- Phylum: Arthropoda
- Clade: Pancrustacea
- Class: Insecta
- Order: Lepidoptera
- Family: Crambidae
- Subfamily: Crambinae
- Tribe: Euchromiusini
- Genus: Euchromius
- Species: E. keredjella

Binomial name
- Euchromius keredjella (Amsel, 1949)

Synonyms
- Eromene keredjella Amsel, 1949; Euchromius keredjellus Bleszynski, 1961

Species of moth

Euchromius keredjella is a moth in the family Crambidae. It was described by Hans Georg Amsel in 1949. It is found in Iran, Afghanistan and Turkey.
