= Chrysoteuchia sonobei =

Scientific classification
- Domain: Eukaryota
- Kingdom: Animalia
- Phylum: Arthropoda
- Class: Insecta
- Order: Lepidoptera
- Family: Crambidae
- Genus: Chrysoteuchia
- Species: C. sonobei

Binomial name
- Chrysoteuchia sonobei (Marumo, 1936)

Synonyms
- Crambus sonobei Marumo, 1936

Species of moth

Chrysoteuchia sonobei is a moth in the family Crambidae. It was described by Nobukatsu Marumo in 1936. It is found in Taiwan.
