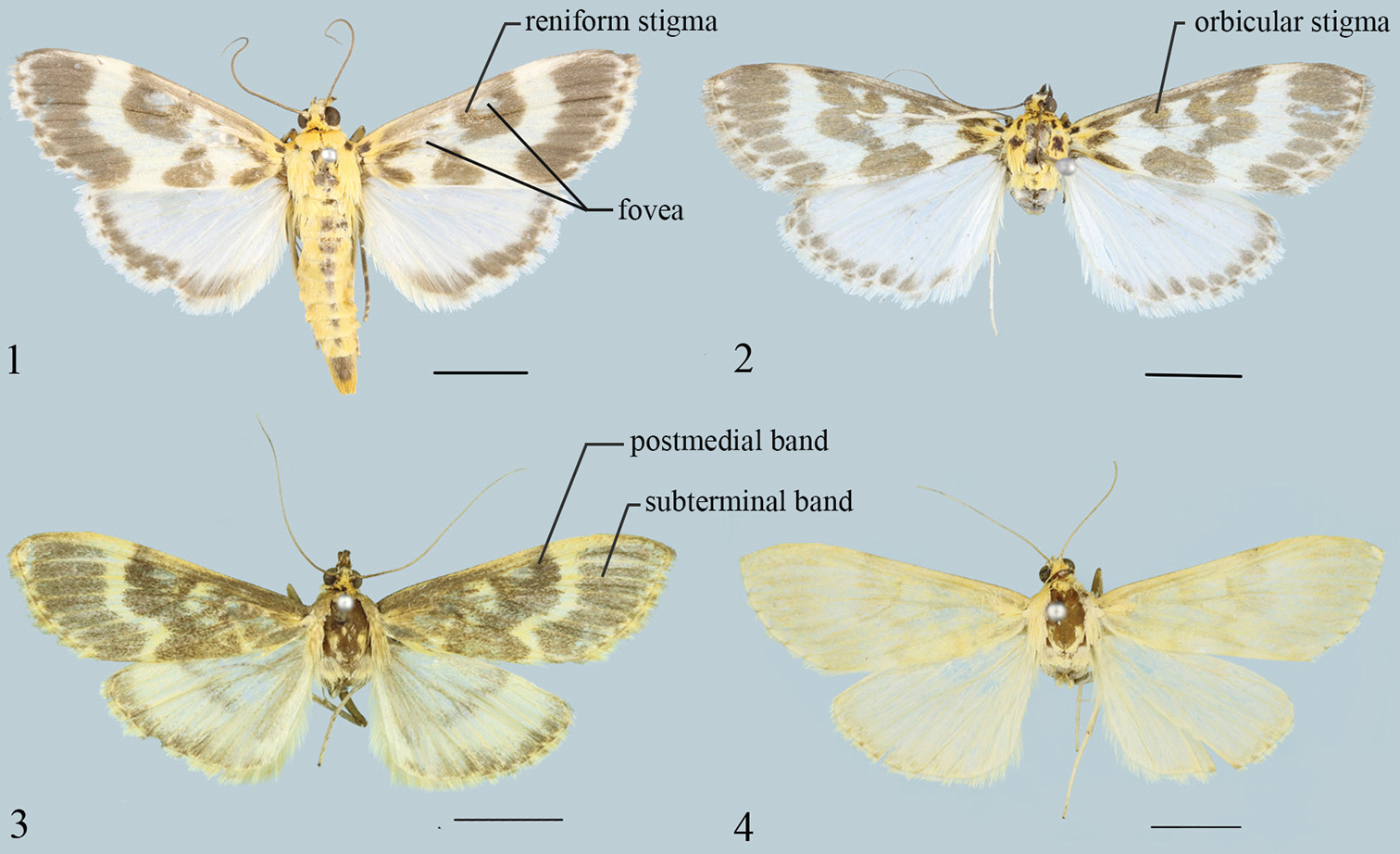
- Epiparbattia gloriosalis, Epiparbattia oligotricha, and Epiparbattia multispinalis

Scientific classification
- Domain: Eukaryota
- Kingdom: Animalia
- Phylum: Arthropoda
- Class: Insecta
- Order: Lepidoptera
- Family: Crambidae
- Subfamily: Pyraustinae
- Genus: Epiparbattia; Caradja, 1925

= Epiparbattia =

Genus of moths

Epiparbattia is a genus of moths of the family Crambidae.

== Species ==
- Epiparbattia gloriosalis Caradja, 1925
- Epiparbattia oligotricha Zhang & Li in Zhang & Li, 2005
