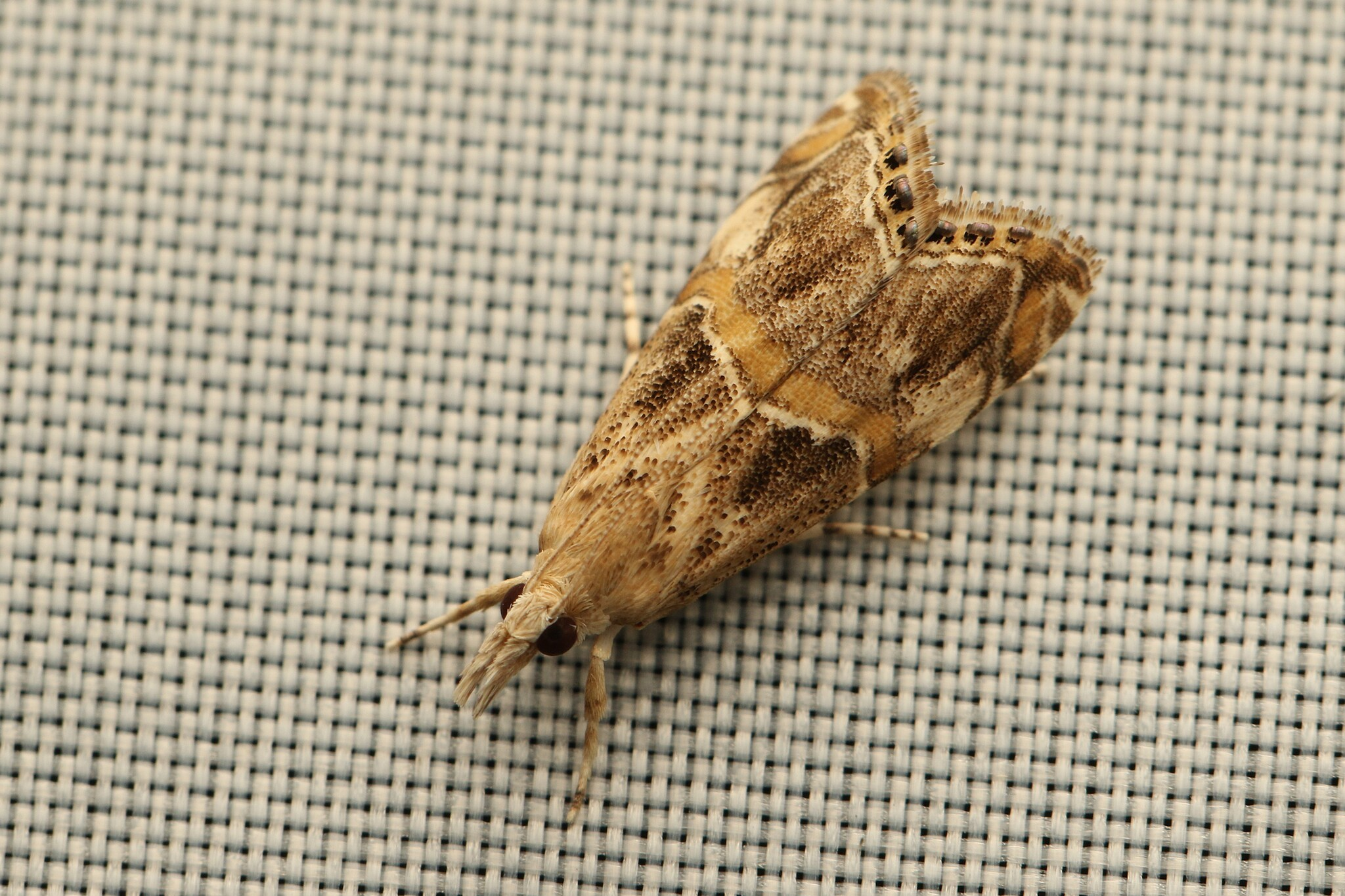
- Euchromius cambridgei, Israel

Scientific classification
- Kingdom: Animalia
- Phylum: Arthropoda
- Clade: Pancrustacea
- Class: Insecta
- Order: Lepidoptera
- Family: Crambidae
- Subfamily: Crambinae
- Tribe: Euchromiusini
- Genus: Euchromius
- Species: E. cambridgei

Binomial name
- Euchromius cambridgei (Zeller, 1867)

Synonyms
- Eromene cambridgei Zeller, 1867; Argyria prototypa Meyrick, 1935; Eromene cambridgii Zeller, 1867; Eromene luciella Chrétien, 1907; Ommatopteryx congruentella Amsel, 1958; Ommatopteryx ilkui Gozmány, 1959; Ommatopteryx szijjartoi Gozmány, 1959

= Euchromius cambridgei =

Species of moth

Euchromius cambridgei is a species of moth in the family Crambidae described by Philipp Christoph Zeller in 1867. It is found in France, Spain, Portugal, Italy, Croatia, Ukraine, the Canary Islands, Tunisia, Libya, Egypt, Sudan, Israel, Jordan, Saudi Arabia, Iran, Afghanistan and Pakistan.

The wingspan is about 17 mm. The forewings are dusty grey, sprinkled with brown scales and an ochreous-yellow transverse streak, internally edged with white. The hindwings are yellowish grey with a darker apex.
