= Elethyia minerva =

Scientific classification
- Domain: Eukaryota
- Kingdom: Animalia
- Phylum: Arthropoda
- Class: Insecta
- Order: Lepidoptera
- Family: Crambidae
- Subfamily: Crambinae
- Tribe: incertae sedis
- Genus: Elethyia
- Species: E. minerva

Binomial name
- Elethyia minerva Błeszyński, 1965

Species of moth

Elethyia minerva is a moth in the family Crambidae. It was described by Stanisław Błeszyński in 1965. It is found in Afghanistan.
