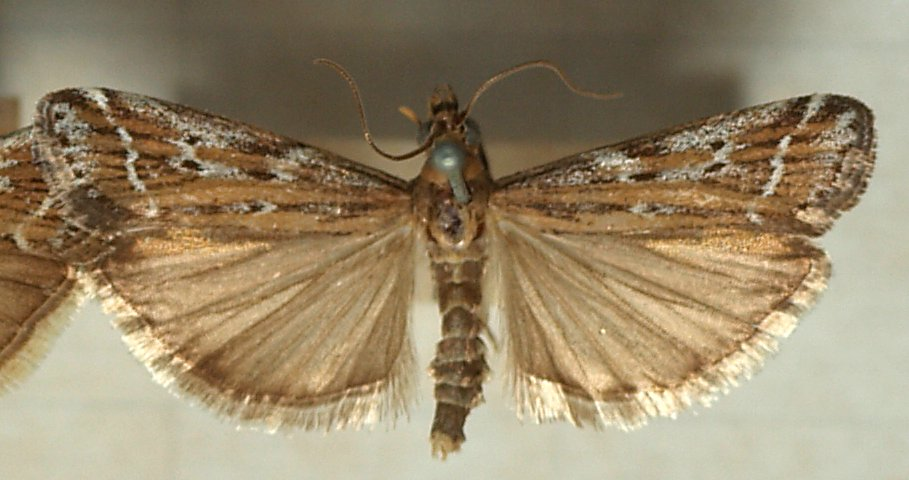

Scientific classification
- Domain: Eukaryota
- Kingdom: Animalia
- Phylum: Arthropoda
- Class: Insecta
- Order: Lepidoptera
- Family: Pyralidae
- Genus: Pempeliella
- Species: P. ornatella

Binomial name
- Pempeliella ornatella (Denis & Schiffermüller, 1775)

Synonyms
- Pempelia ornatella; Tinea ornatella Denis & Schiffermuller, 1775; Pempelia gigantella Amsel, 1932; Pempelia ornatella elbursella Amsel, 1954; Pempelia fraternella Ragonot, 1887; Pempelia ornatalis Hübner, 1825; Pempelia perornatella Guenée, 1845; Tinea criptella Hübner, 1796; Phycis criptea Haworth, 1811

= Pempeliella ornatella =

Species of moth

Pempeliella ornatella is a moth of the family Pyralidae described by Michael Denis and Ignaz Schiffermüller in 1775. It is found in most of Europe, east to the Ural, Siberia, central Yakutia and Kyrgyzstan.

The wingspan is 23–27 millimetres (0.91–1.06 in).The forewings are brownish ochreous; veins and costa suffusedly fuscous, somewhat mixed with white; lines whitish, first interrupted, edged posteriorly with dark spots on veins, second almost straight; two dark fuscous suffusedly whitish-edged transversely placed discal dots. Hindwings fuscous or light fuscous.

Adults are on wing from mid-June to August in one generation.

The larvae live in a web near the roots of Thymus species.

== Subspecies ==
- Pempeliella ornatella ornatella
- Pempeliella ornatella gigantella
