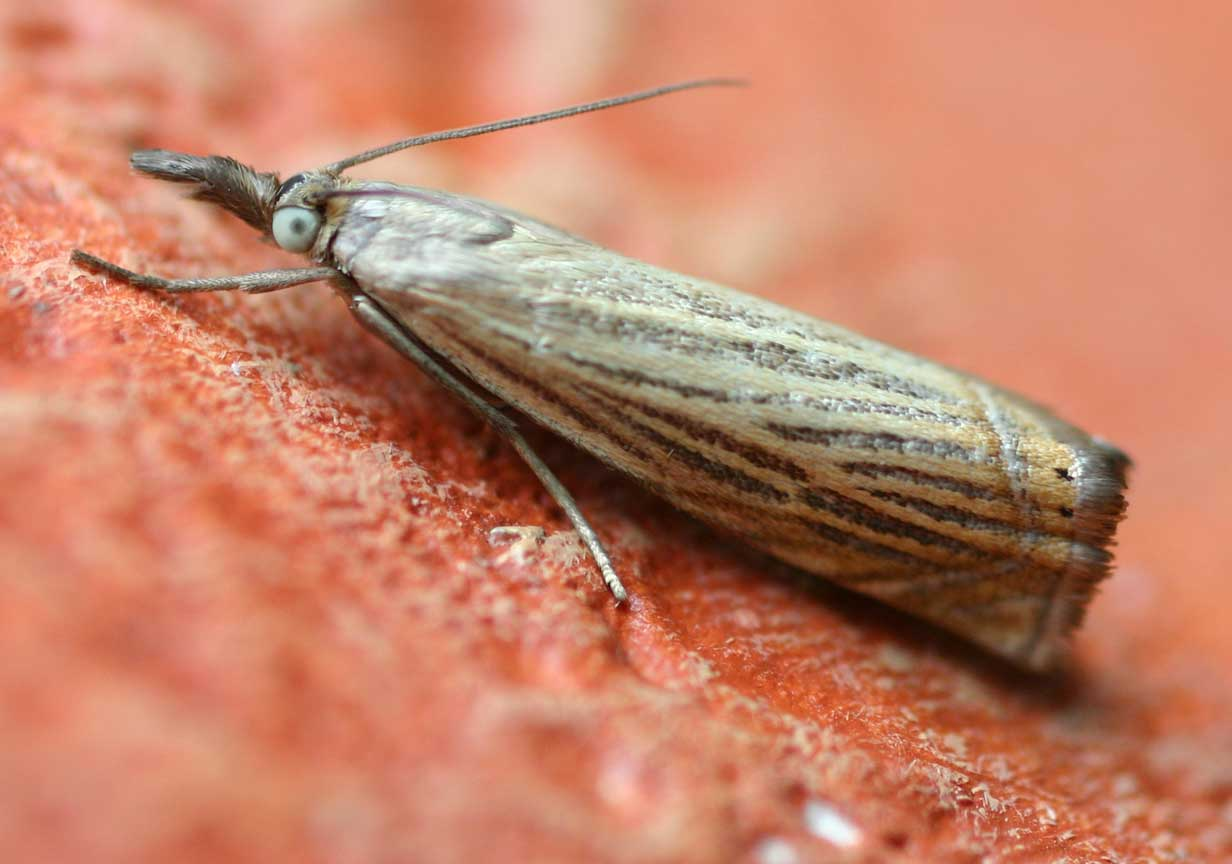
- Chrysoteuchia culmella

Scientific classification
- Domain: Eukaryota
- Kingdom: Animalia
- Phylum: Arthropoda
- Class: Insecta
- Order: Lepidoptera
- Family: Crambidae
- Tribe: Crambini
- Genus: Chrysoteuchia; Hübner, 1825

Synonyms
- Amphibolia Snellen, 1884; Veronese Bleszynski, 1962

= Chrysoteuchia =

Genus of moths

Chrysoteuchia is a genus of moths of the family Crambidae described by Jacob Hübner in 1825. Most are native to Asia.

The cranberry girdler (C. topiarius) is a pest of turfgrasses in North America. It also attacks cranberry and fir.

There were about thirty species in the genus as of 2010.

== Species ==
- Chrysoteuchia argentistriellus (Leech, 1889)
- Chrysoteuchia atrosignatus (Zeller, 1877)
- Chrysoteuchia culmella (Linnaeus, 1758) - garden grass-veneer
- Chrysoteuchia curvicavus Song & Chen in Chen, Song & Yuan, 2001
- Chrysoteuchia daisetsuzana (Matsumura, 1927)
- Chrysoteuchia deltella Song & Chen in Chen, Song & Yuan, 2001
- Chrysoteuchia dentatella Song & Chen in Chen, Song & Yuan, 2001
- Chrysoteuchia diplogrammus (Zeller, 1863)
- Chrysoteuchia disasterella Bleszynski, 1965
- Chrysoteuchia distinctellus (Leech, 1889)
- Chrysoteuchia dividellus (Snellen, 1890)
- Chrysoteuchia fractellus (South in Leech & South, 1901)
- Chrysoteuchia fuliginosellus (South in Leech & South, 1901)
- Chrysoteuchia funebrellus (Caradja in Caradja & Meyrick, 1937)
- Chrysoteuchia furva Li & Li, 2010
- Chrysoteuchia gonoxes (Bleszynski, 1962)
- Chrysoteuchia gregorella Bleszynski, 1965
- Chrysoteuchia hamatella Chen, Song & Yuan, 2001
- Chrysoteuchia hamatoides Song & Chen in Chen, Song & Yuan, 2001
- Chrysoteuchia hyalodiscella (Caradja, 1927)
- Chrysoteuchia lolotiella (Caradja, 1927)
- Chrysoteuchia mandschuricus (Christoph, 1881)
- Chrysoteuchia moriokensis (Okano, 1958)
- Chrysoteuchia ningensis Li, 2012
- Chrysoteuchia nonifasciaria Li & Li, 2010
- Chrysoteuchia picturatellus (South in Leech & South, 1901)
- Chrysoteuchia porcelanellus (Motschulsky, 1861)
- Chrysoteuchia pseudodiplogrammus (Okano, 1962)
- Chrysoteuchia pyraustoides (Erschoff, 1877)
- Chrysoteuchia quadrapicula Chen, Song & Yuan, 2003
- Chrysoteuchia rotundiprojecta Li & Li, 2010
- Chrysoteuchia shafferi Li & Li, 2010
- Chrysoteuchia sonobei (Marumo, 1936)
- Chrysoteuchia topiarius (Zeller, 1866) - topiary grass-veneer moth, subterranean sod webworm, cranberry girdler
- Chrysoteuchia yuennanellus (Caradja in Caradja & Meyrick, 1937)
