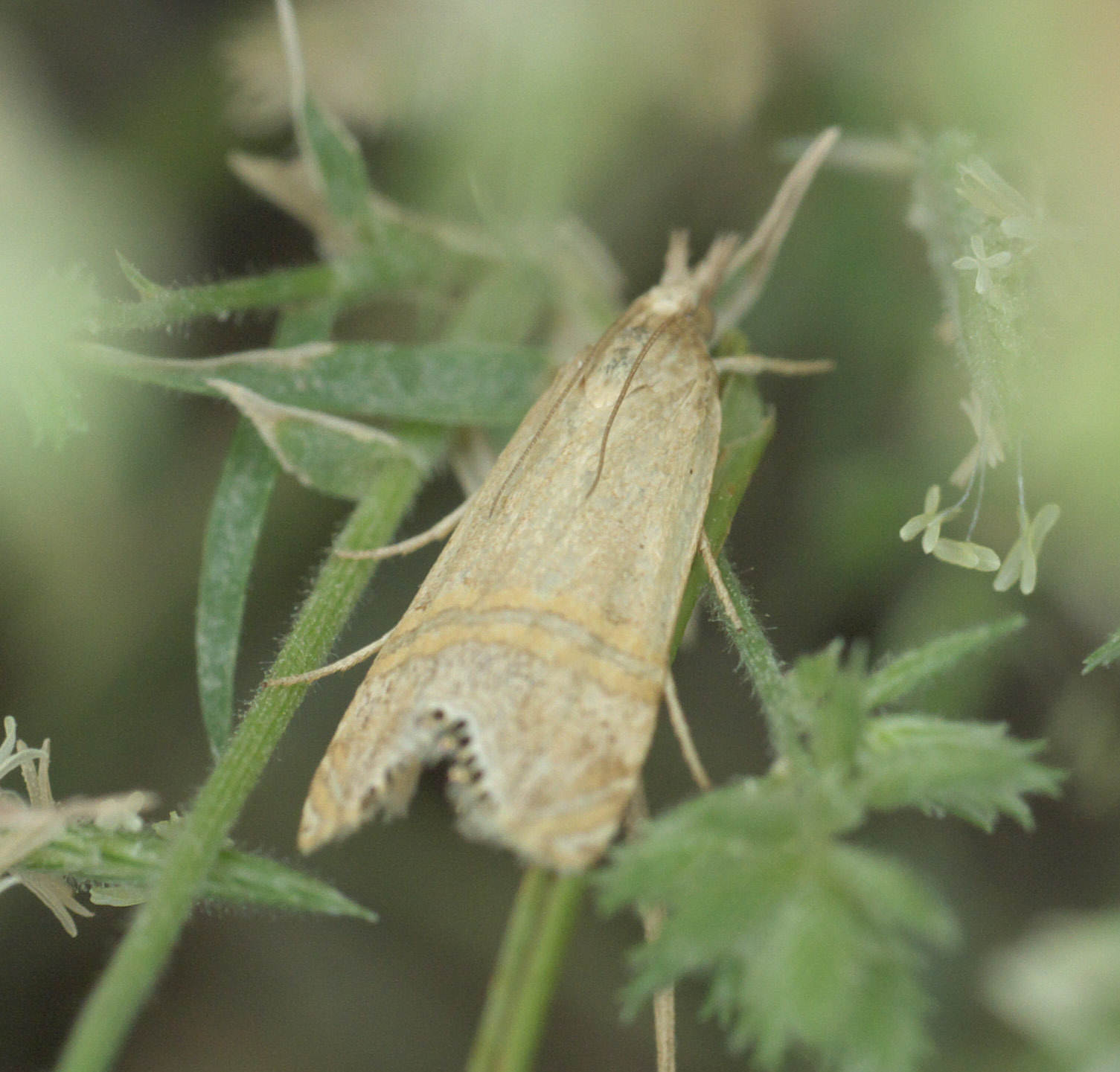
- Euchromius sp.

Scientific classification
- Kingdom: Animalia
- Phylum: Arthropoda
- Clade: Pancrustacea
- Class: Insecta
- Order: Lepidoptera
- Family: Crambidae
- Subfamily: Crambinae
- Tribe: Euchromiusini; Léger, Landry & Nuss, 2019
- Genus: Euchromius; Guenée, 1845

Synonyms
- Eromene Hübner, 1825; Ommatopteryx Kirby, 1897; Pseudoancylolomia Ahmad, Zaidi & Kamaluddin, 1982

= Euchromius =

Genus of moths

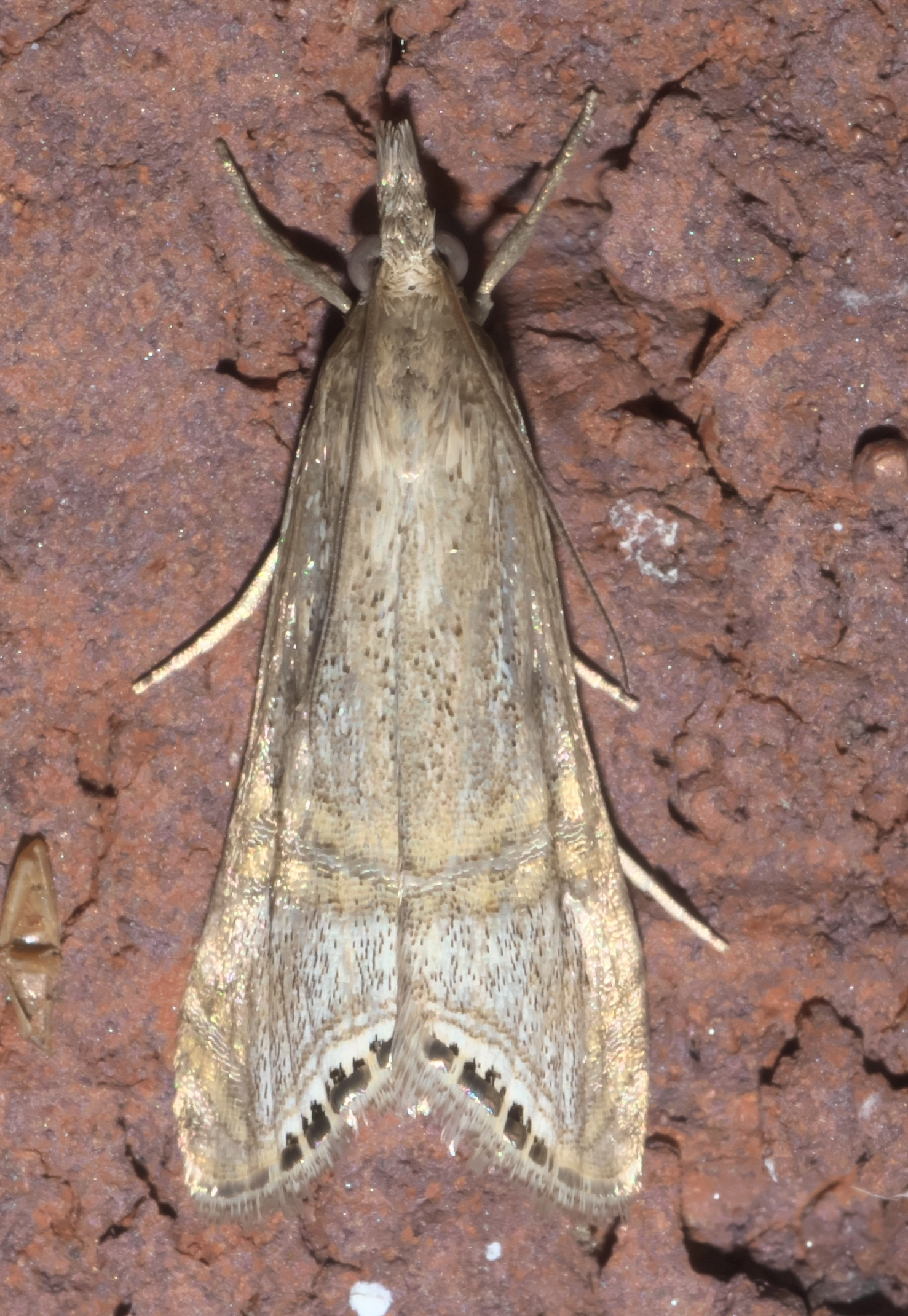
Euchromius ocellea, belted grass-veneer

Euchromius is a genus of moths of the family Crambidae. It was described by Achille Guenée in 1845.

== Species ==
- Euchromius anapiellus (Zeller, 1847)
- Euchromius aris Schouten, 1988
- Euchromius bella (Hübner, 1796)
- Euchromius bleszynskiellus Popescu-Gorj, 1964
- Euchromius bleszynskii Roesler, 1975
- Euchromius brunnealis (Hampson, 1919)
- Euchromius californicalis (Packard, 1873)
- Euchromius cambridgei (Zeller, 1867)
- Euchromius circulus Schouten, 1992
- Euchromius confusus Schouten, 1992
- Euchromius cornus Schouten, 1990
- Euchromius discopis (Hampson, 1919)
- Euchromius donum Schouten, 1988
- Euchromius erum Schouten, 1988
- Euchromius galapagosalis Capps, 1966
- Euchromius geminus Schouten, 1988
- Euchromius gnathosellus Schouten, 1988
- Euchromius gozmanyi Bleszynski, 1961
- Euchromius gratiosella (Caradja, 1910)
- Euchromius hampsoni (Rothschild, 1921)
- Euchromius jaxartella (Erschoff, 1874)
- Euchromius keredjella (Amsel, 1949)
- Euchromius klimeschi Bleszynski, 1961
- Euchromius labellum Schouten, 1988
- Euchromius limaellus Bleszynski, 1967
- Euchromius locustus Schouten, 1988
- Euchromius malekalis Amsel, 1961
- Euchromius matador Bleszynski, 1966
- Euchromius micralis (Hampson, 1919)
- Euchromius minutus Schouten, 1992
- Euchromius mouchai Bleszynski, 1961
- Euchromius mythus Bleszynski, 1970
- Euchromius nigrobasalis Schouten, 1988
- Euchromius nivalis (Caradja in Caradja & Meyrick, 1937)
- Euchromius ocellea (Haworth, 1811)
- Euchromius ornatus Schouten, 1992
- Euchromius pulverosa (Christoph in Romanoff, 1887)
- Euchromius pygmaea (E. Hering, 1903)
- Euchromius ramburiellus (Duponchel, 1836)
- Euchromius rayatella (Amsel, 1949)
- Euchromius saltalis Capps, 1966
- Euchromius scobiolae Bleszynski, 1965
- Euchromius subcambridgei Bleszynski, 1965
- Euchromius sudanellus Bleszynski, 1965
- Euchromius superbellus (Zeller, 1849)
- Euchromius tanalis Schouten, 1988
- Euchromius viettei Bleszynski, 1961
- Euchromius vinculellus (Zeller, 1847)
- Euchromius zagulajevi Bleszynski, 1965
- Euchromius zephyrus Bleszynski, 1962
