= Euchromius rayatellus =

Scientific classification
- Kingdom: Animalia
- Phylum: Arthropoda
- Clade: Pancrustacea
- Class: Insecta
- Order: Lepidoptera
- Family: Crambidae
- Subfamily: Crambinae
- Tribe: Euchromiusini
- Genus: Euchromius
- Species: E. rayatellus

Binomial name
- Euchromius rayatellus (Amsel, 1949)

Synonyms
- Eromene rayatellus Amsel, 1949; Euchromius rayatella

Species of moth

Euchromius rayatellus is a species of moth in the family Crambidae described by Hans Georg Amsel in 1949. It is found in France, Italy, Greece, Bulgaria, Ukraine, Russia, Turkey, Afghanistan, Jordan, Iran, Iraq, Syria, and Israel.
