= Euchromius locustus =

Scientific classification
- Kingdom: Animalia
- Phylum: Arthropoda
- Clade: Pancrustacea
- Class: Insecta
- Order: Lepidoptera
- Family: Crambidae
- Subfamily: Crambinae
- Tribe: Euchromiusini
- Genus: Euchromius
- Species: E. locustus

Binomial name
- Euchromius locustus Schouten, 1988

Species of moth

Euchromius locustus is a species of moth in the family Crambidae. It is found in Tanzania, Zaire and Zambia.

The length of the forewings is 14–17 mm. Adults have been recorded in August, September, October and December.
