= Lamprophaia =

Scientific classification
- Domain: Eukaryota
- Kingdom: Animalia
- Phylum: Arthropoda
- Class: Insecta
- Order: Lepidoptera
- Family: Crambidae
- Subfamily: Pyraustinae
- Genus: Lamprophaia; Caradja, 1925

Genus of moths

Lamprophaia is a genus of moths of the family Crambidae.

== Species ==
- Lamprophaia albifimbrialis (Walker, 1866)
- Lamprophaia mirabilis Caradja, 1925
