= Pempeliella enderleini =

Scientific classification
- Domain: Eukaryota
- Kingdom: Animalia
- Phylum: Arthropoda
- Class: Insecta
- Order: Lepidoptera
- Family: Pyralidae
- Genus: Pempeliella
- Species: P. enderleini

Binomial name
- Pempeliella enderleini (Rebel, 1934)

Synonyms
- Pempelia enderleini Rebel, 1934

Species of moth

Pempeliella enderleini is a species of snout moth. It is found on the Balearic Islands.
