= Euchromius galapagosalis =

Scientific classification
- Kingdom: Animalia
- Phylum: Arthropoda
- Clade: Pancrustacea
- Class: Insecta
- Order: Lepidoptera
- Family: Crambidae
- Subfamily: Crambinae
- Tribe: Euchromiusini
- Genus: Euchromius
- Species: E. galapagosalis

Binomial name
- Euchromius galapagosalis Capps, 1966

Species of moth

Euchromius galapagosalis is a moth in the family Crambidae. It was described by Hahn William Capps in 1966. It is found on the Galápagos Islands.
