= Chrysoteuchia distinctellus =

Scientific classification
- Domain: Eukaryota
- Kingdom: Animalia
- Phylum: Arthropoda
- Class: Insecta
- Order: Lepidoptera
- Family: Crambidae
- Genus: Chrysoteuchia
- Species: C. distinctellus

Binomial name
- Chrysoteuchia distinctellus (Leech, 1889)

Synonyms
- Crambus distinctellus Leech, 1889

Species of moth

Chrysoteuchia distinctellus is a moth in the family Crambidae. It was described by John Henry Leech in 1889. It is found in Japan and Russia.
