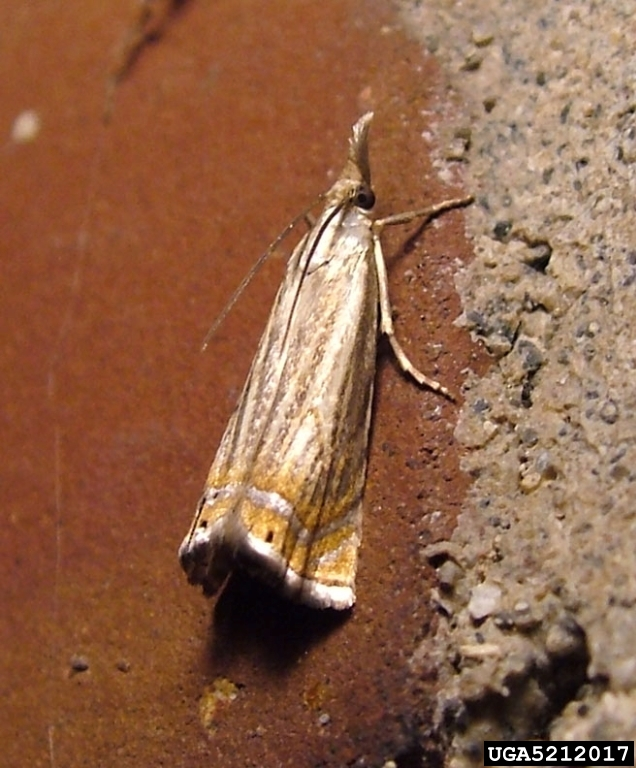

Scientific classification
- Kingdom: Animalia
- Phylum: Arthropoda
- Clade: Pancrustacea
- Class: Insecta
- Order: Lepidoptera
- Family: Crambidae
- Genus: Chrysoteuchia
- Species: C. topiarius

Binomial name
- Chrysoteuchia topiarius (Zeller, 1866)

Synonyms
- Crambus topiarius Zeller, 1866; Chrysoteuchia topiaria; Chrysoteuchia hortuellus topiarius; Crambus toparius Hampson, 1896; Crambus topiarius vachellellus Kearfott, 1903; Crambus vachelellus Bleszynski & Collins, 1962

= Chrysoteuchia topiarius =

Species of moth

Chrysoteuchia topiarius, the topiary grass-veneer moth, subterranean sod webworm or cranberry girdler, is a moth of the family Crambidae. The species was first described by Philipp Christoph Zeller in 1866. It is found in most of North America.

The wingspan is 17–20 mm. Adults are on wing from late June to early August in one generation per year.

The larvae feed on a wide range of plant, including mostly grasses. As larvae, they also feed at the base of cranberry vines, which results in irregular brown and dead patches, thus giving it the name the cranberry girdler.

== Gallery ==
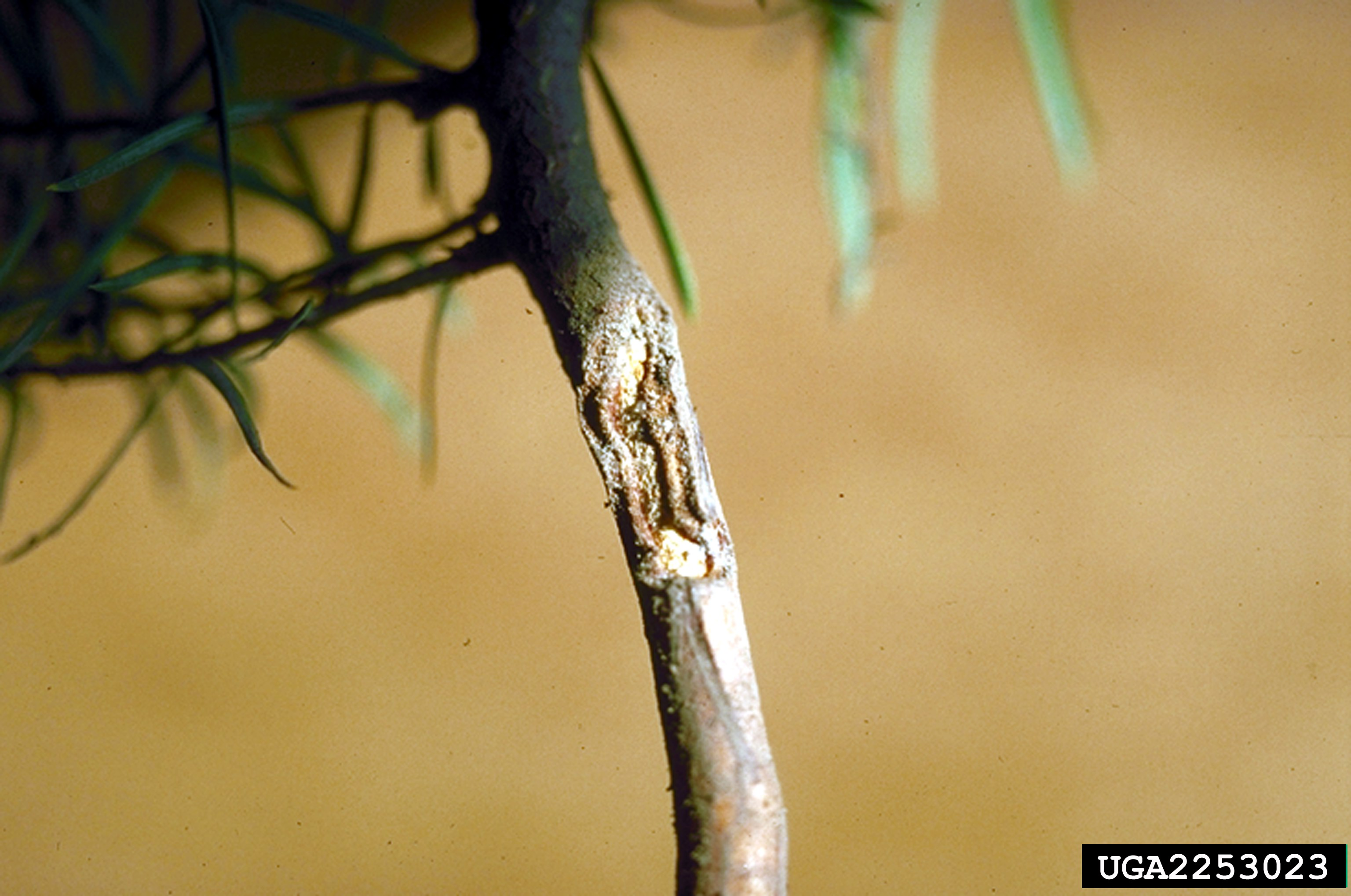
Damage

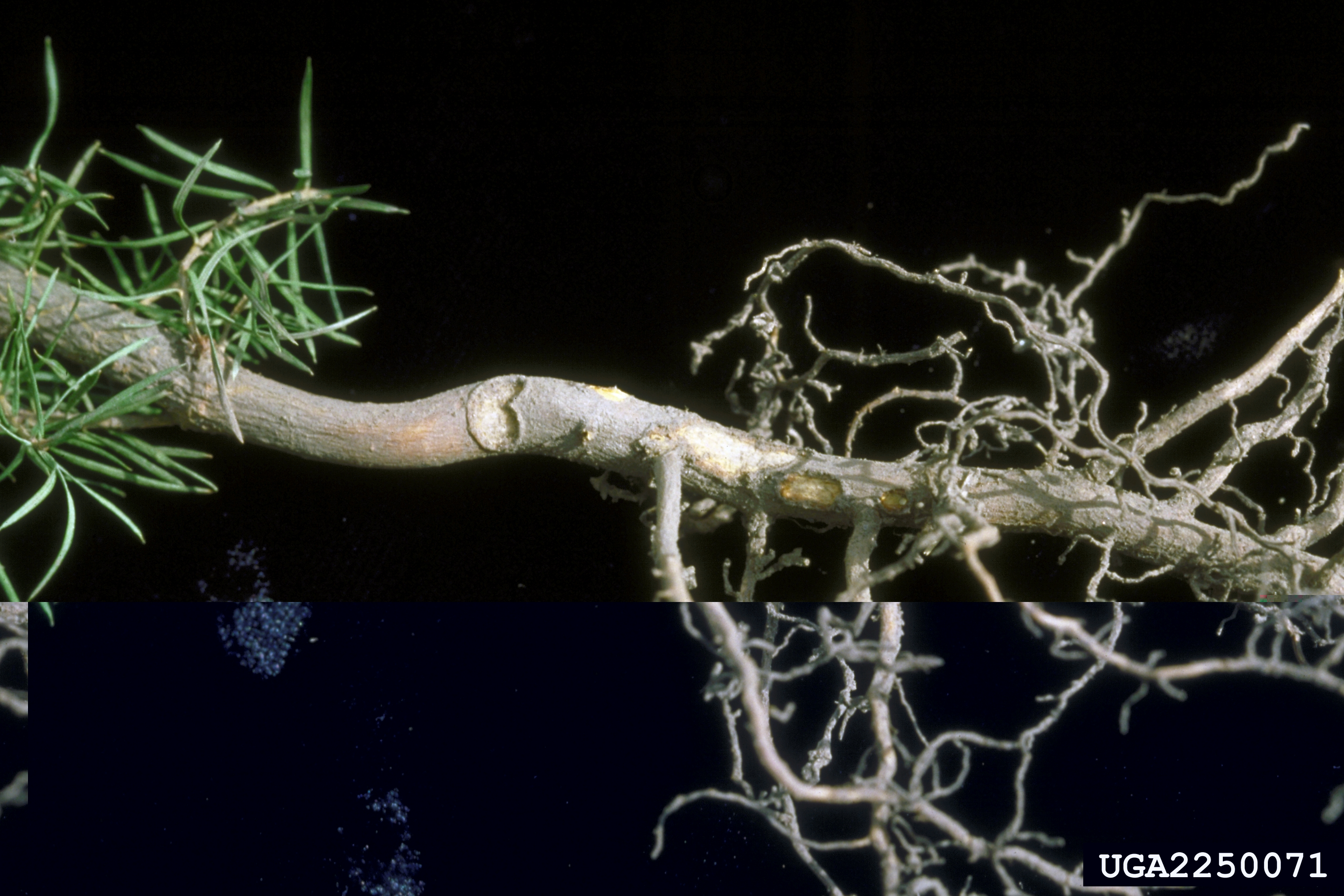
Damage

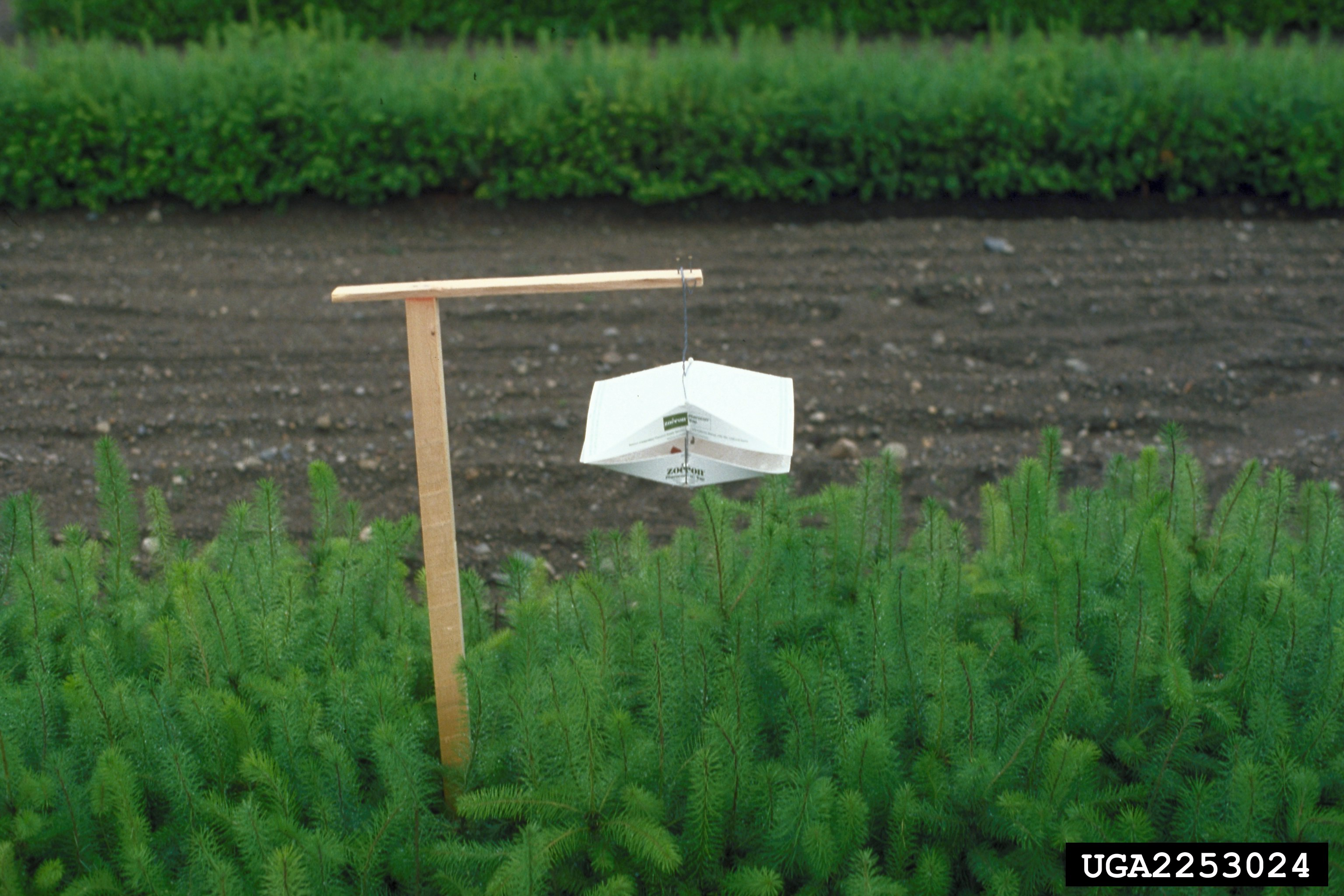
Trap
