= Pempeliella matilella =

Scientific classification
- Domain: Eukaryota
- Kingdom: Animalia
- Phylum: Arthropoda
- Class: Insecta
- Order: Lepidoptera
- Family: Pyralidae
- Genus: Pempeliella
- Species: P. matilella

Binomial name
- Pempeliella matilella Leraut, 2001

Species of moth

Pempeliella matilella is a species of snout moth. It is found on Sardinia and Corsica.
