= Euchromius circulus =

Scientific classification
- Kingdom: Animalia
- Phylum: Arthropoda
- Clade: Pancrustacea
- Class: Insecta
- Order: Lepidoptera
- Family: Crambidae
- Subfamily: Crambinae
- Tribe: Euchromiusini
- Genus: Euchromius
- Species: E. circulus

Binomial name
- Euchromius circulus Schouten, 1992

Species of moth

Euchromius circulus is a moth in the family Crambidae. It was described by Schouten in 1992. It is found in Myanmar.
