= Euchromius pygmaea =

Scientific classification
- Kingdom: Animalia
- Phylum: Arthropoda
- Clade: Pancrustacea
- Class: Insecta
- Order: Lepidoptera
- Family: Crambidae
- Subfamily: Crambinae
- Tribe: Euchromiusini
- Genus: Euchromius
- Species: E. pygmaea

Binomial name
- Euchromius pygmaea (E. Hering, 1903)

Synonyms
- Eromene pygmaea E. Hering, 1903

Species of moth

Euchromius pygmaea is a moth in the family Crambidae. It was described by Hering in 1903. It is found on Sumatra.
