= Aristide Caradja =

Romanian entomologist and lawyer

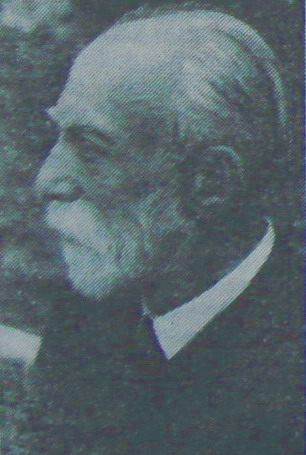
- Born: September 28, 1861; Dresden, Kingdom of Saxony
- Died: May 29, 1955 (aged 93); Bucharest, Socialist Republic of Romania
- Occupations: Entomologist, Lawyer
- Known for: Discovering hundreds of species of butterflies and moths

Aristide Caradja (28 September 1861 – 29 May 1955) was a Romanian entomologist and lawyer.

== Life ==
Aristide Caradja was born in 1861 to the Caradja family, nobles with Greek-Byzantine origins who had serves as dignitaries in the Ottoman Empire. His father died in 1887, whereupon Aristide moved to Romania. He did most of his work there. In 1893, Caradja published his first paper, which organized and discovered several butterflies in France and in his area. Between 1927 and 1939, he studied and collected butterflies in the Black Sea region and in China. In 1944, he donated his work and collection (known as the Lepidoptera collection) to the Grigore Antipa National Museum of Natural History. He was elected a titular member of the Romanian Academy in 1948, soon after the communist regime came to power. He retired shortly thereafter and died in Bucharest in 1955.
