= List of moths of Turkey (Coleophoridae) =

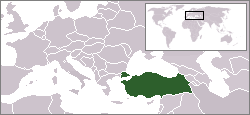
Location of Turkey

This is a list of moths of the family Coleophoridae that are found in Turkey. It also acts as an index to the species articles and forms part of the full List of moths of Turkey.

- Augasma aeratellum Zeller, 1839
- Coleophora adelogrammella Zeller, 1849
- Coleophora adjectella Hering, 1937
- Coleophora adjunctella Hodgkinson, 1882
- Coleophora agrianella Rebel, 1934
- Coleophora albicostella Duponchel, 1842
- Coleophora albipennella Staudinger, 1879
- Coleophora albostraminata Toll, 1960
- Coleophora albotitae Rebel, 1935
- Coleophora amasicola Toll, 1942
- Coleophora amasiella Stainton, 1867
- Coleophora amentastra Falkovitsh, 1972
- Coleophora amethystinella Ragonot, 1885
- Coleophora ammophora Falkovitsh, 1989
- Coleophora arenbergeri Glaser, 1981
- Coleophora argentifimbriata Walsingham, 1907
- Coleophora argentipennella Duponchel, 1838
- Coleophora argentula Stephens, 1834
- Coleophora argyrella Herrich-Schäffer, 1861
- Coleophora artemisiella Scott, 1861
- Coleophora asiaeminoris Toll, 1952
- Coleophora asthenella Constant, 1893
- Coleophora astragalella Zeller, 1849
- Coleophora audeoudi Rebel, 1935
- Coleophora ballotella F.R., 1839
- Coleophora basimaculella Mann, 1864
- Coleophora bernoulliella Goeze, 1783
- Coleophora bilineella Herrich-Schäffer, 1855
- Coleophora bitlisella Baldizzone, 1994
- Coleophora bivittella Staudinger, 1879
- Coleophora breviuscula Staudinger, 1880
- Coleophora caelebipennella Zeller, 1839
- Coleophora calycotomella Stainton, 1869
- Coleophora canariipennella Toll, 1959
- Coleophora capillata Baldizzone, 1994
- Coleophora cappadociae Baldizzone, 1994
- Coleophora cartilaginella Christoph, 1872
- Coleophora caucasica Stainton, 1867
- Coleophora chamaedriella Bruand, [1852]
- Coleophora christenseni Baldizzone, 1983
- Coleophora confusa Staudinger, 1880
- Coleophora congeriella Staudinger, 1859
- Coleophora conspicuella Zeller, 1849
- Coleophora conyzae Zeller, 1868
- Coleophora coracipennella (Hübner, 1796)
- Coleophora corsicella Walsingham, 1898
- Coleophora craccella Valet, 1835
- Coleophora crepidinella Zeller, 1847
- Coleophora crispella Baldizzone, 1994
- Coleophora cuprariella Zeller, 1847
- Coleophora currucipennella Zeller, 1839
- Coleophora deauratella Lienig & Zeller, 1846
- Coleophora dianthi Herrich-Schäffer, 1855
- Coleophora diffinis Staudinger, 1879
- Coleophora dignella Toll, 1961
- Coleophora dubiella Baker, 1888
- Coleophora echinacea Falkovitsh, 1972
- Coleophora egenella Toll, 1952
- Coleophora eichleri Patzak, 1977
- Coleophora etrusca Baldizzone, 1990
- Coleophora eupreta Walsingham, 1907
- Coleophora ferruginea Baldizzone, 1994
- Coleophora fiorii Toll, 1953
- Coleophora flaviella Mann, 1857
- Coleophora flavilineella Toll, 1952
- Coleophora flavipennella Duponchel, 1843
- Coleophora follicularis Vallot, 1802
- Coleophora fringillella Zeller, 1839
- Coleophora frischella (Linnaeus, 1758)
- Coleophora fuscicornis Zeller, 1847
- Coleophora fuscociliella Zeller, 1849
- Coleophora galbulipennella Zeller, 1848
- Coleophora gallipennella (Hübner, 1796)
- Coleophora gaviaepennella Fuchs, 1881
- Coleophora gazella Toll, 1952
- Coleophora glaucicolella Wood, 1892
- Coleophora goluensis Baldizzone, 1994
- Coleophora granulosella Staudinger, 1880
- Coleophora gryphipennella (Hübner, 1796)
- Coleophora gurunensis Baldizzone, 1994
- Coleophora hartigi Toll, 1944
- Coleophora hemerobiella Scopoli, 1763
- Coleophora hieronella Zeller, 1849
- Coleophora histricella Toll, 1957
- Coleophora inflatae Stainton, 1857
- Coleophora irvizensis Baldizzone, 1994
- Coleophora isomoera Falkovitsh, 1972
- Coleophora ispartae Baldizzone, 1994
- Coleophora karakurti Baldizzone, 1994
- Coleophora kasyi Toll, 1961
- Coleophora krautzi Rebel, 1933
- Coleophora kroneella Fuchs, 1899
- Coleophora kuehnella Goeze, 1783
- Coleophora lassella Staudinger, 1859
- Coleophora laticostella Mann, 1859
- Coleophora leucapennella (Hübner, 1796)
- Coleophora limosipennella Duponchel, 1843
- Coleophora lineariella Zeller, 1849
- Coleophora lixella Zeller, 1849
- Coleophora lusciniaepenella Treitschke, 1833
- Coleophora luteolella Staudinger, 1880
- Coleophora lutipennella Zeller, 1838
- Coleophora lycaoniae Baldizzone, 1994
- Coleophora malatiella Toll, 1952
- Coleophora mausolella Chrétien, 1908
- Coleophora mayrella (Hübner, [1813])
- Coleophora medelichensis Krone, 1908
- Coleophora milvipennis Zeller, 1839
- Coleophora miniaxella Toll, 1952
- Coleophora miserella Staudinger, 1880
- Coleophora narbonensis Baldizzone, 1990
- Coleophora necessaria Staudinger, 1880
- Coleophora niditipennella Toll & Amsel, 1967
- Coleophora nifridorsella Amsel, 1935
- Coleophora niveicostella Zeller, 1839
- Coleophora niveistrigella Heinemann & Wocke, [1877]
- Coleophora nomgona Falkovitsh, 1975
- Coleophora nutantella Mühlig & Frey, 1857
- Coleophora obliterata Toll, 1952
- Coleophora obtectella Zeller, 1849
- Coleophora obviella Rebel, 1914
- Coleophora occatella Staudinger, 1880
- Coleophora ochrea Haworth, 1828
- Coleophora ochripenella Zeller, 1849
- Coleophora onopordiella Zeller, 1849
- Coleophora oriolella Zeller, 1849
- Coleophora ornatipennella (Hübner, 1796)
- Coleophora paphlagoniae Baldizzone, 1994
- Coleophora paraptarmica Toll & Amsel, 1967
- Coleophora parcella Toll, 1952
- Coleophora parthenica Meyrick, 1891
- Coleophora partitella Zeller, 1849
- Coleophora pellicornella Zerny, 1930
- Coleophora pennella ([Denis & Schiffermüller], 1775)
- Coleophora phlomidis Stainton, 1867
- Coleophora phrygiae Baldizzone, 1994
- Coleophora preisseckeri Toll, 1942
- Coleophora protecta Walsingham, 1907
- Coleophora pseudociconiella Toll, 1952
- Coleophora ptarmicia Walsingham, 1910
- Coleophora pyrenaica Baldizzone, 1980
- Coleophora pyrrhulipennella Zeller, 1839
- Coleophora rasthenica Meyrick, 1891
- Coleophora riffelensis Rebel, 1913
- Coleophora salicorniae Heinemann & Wocke, [1877]
- Coleophora sarehma Toll, 1956
- Coleophora saxicolella Duponchel, 1843
- Coleophora serpylletorum Hering, 1889
- Coleophora serratella (Linnaeus, 1761)
- Coleophora serratulella Herrich-Schäffer, 1855
- Coleophora setipalpella Staudinger, 1879
- Coleophora silenenlla Herrich-Schäffer, 1855
- Coleophora soffneriella Toll, 1961
- Coleophora spiniferella Toll, 1952
- Coleophora spissicornis Haworth, 1828
- Coleophora stramentella Zeller, 1849
- Coleophora subochracea Toll, 1952
- Coleophora symphistropha Reznik, 1976
- Coleophora taeniipennella Herrich-Schäffer, 1855
- Coleophora tamesis Waters, 1929
- Coleophora taurica Baldizzone, 1994
- Coleophora tauricella Staudinger, 1880
- Coleophora taygeti Baldizzone, 1983
- Coleophora testudo Falkovitsh, 1973
- Coleophora therinella Tengström, 1847
- Coleophora thymi Hering, 1942
- Coleophora treskaensis Toll & Amsel, 1967
- Coleophora trifolii Curtis, 1832
- Coleophora trigeminella Fuchs, 1881
- Coleophora tripeniella Baldizzone, 1994
- Coleophora tristella Staudinger, 1879
- Coleophora turca Baldizzone, 1994
- Coleophora univittella Staudinger, 1880
- Coleophora valesianella Zeller, 1849
- Coleophora versurella Zeller, 1849
- Coleophora vicinella Zeller, 1849
- Coleophora virgatella Zeller, 1849
- Coleophora vulnerariae Zeller, 1839
- Coleophora vulpecula Zeller, 1849
- Coleophora vulpeculoides Toll, 1952
- Coleophora walsinghami Baldizzone, 1990
- Coleophora wiltshirei Toll, 1959
- Coleophora wockeella Zeller, 1849
- Coleophora xanthoargentea Toll, 1959
- Coleophora zelleriella Heinemann, 1854
- Metriotes lutarea Haworth, 1828
- Parametriotes theae Kuznetsov, 1916
