= Coleophora strophingella =

Scientific classification
- Kingdom: Animalia
- Phylum: Arthropoda
- Clade: Pancrustacea
- Class: Insecta
- Order: Lepidoptera
- Family: Coleophoridae
- Genus: Coleophora
- Species: C. strophingella

Binomial name
- Coleophora strophingella Baldizzone, 1994

Species of moth

Coleophora strophingella is a moth of the family Coleophoridae that can be found in Algeria and Iran.
