= Coleophora parvicuprella =

Scientific classification
- Kingdom: Animalia
- Phylum: Arthropoda
- Clade: Pancrustacea
- Class: Insecta
- Order: Lepidoptera
- Family: Coleophoridae
- Genus: Coleophora
- Species: C. parvicuprella

Binomial name
- Coleophora parvicuprella Baldizzone & Tabell, 2006

Species of moth

Coleophora parvicuprella is a moth of the family Coleophoridae. It is found in southern Bulgaria, northern Greece and western Turkey.

The wingspan is 9.5-10.5 mm.
