= Coleophora agridensis =

Scientific classification
- Kingdom: Animalia
- Phylum: Arthropoda
- Clade: Pancrustacea
- Class: Insecta
- Order: Lepidoptera
- Family: Coleophoridae
- Genus: Coleophora
- Species: C. agridensis

Binomial name
- Coleophora agridensis Baldizzone, 2001

Species of moth

Coleophora agridensis is a species of moth in the family Coleophoridae. It is found in Turkey.
