= Coleophora hipponae =

Scientific classification
- Kingdom: Animalia
- Phylum: Arthropoda
- Clade: Pancrustacea
- Class: Insecta
- Order: Lepidoptera
- Family: Coleophoridae
- Genus: Coleophora
- Species: C. hipponae

Binomial name
- Coleophora hipponae Baldizzone, 1993

Species of moth

Coleophora hipponae is a moth of the family Coleophoridae. It is found in North Africa.
