= Coleophora denticulata =

Scientific classification
- Kingdom: Animalia
- Phylum: Arthropoda
- Clade: Pancrustacea
- Class: Insecta
- Order: Lepidoptera
- Family: Coleophoridae
- Genus: Coleophora
- Species: C. denticulata

Binomial name
- Coleophora denticulata Baldizzone, 1989

Species of moth

Coleophora denticulata is a moth of the family Coleophoridae. It is found in Tibet.

The wingspan is about 14 mm. The larval host plant is unknown.
