= Coleophora libyca =

Scientific classification
- Kingdom: Animalia
- Phylum: Arthropoda
- Clade: Pancrustacea
- Class: Insecta
- Order: Lepidoptera
- Family: Coleophoridae
- Genus: Coleophora
- Species: C. libyca

Binomial name
- Coleophora libyca Baldizzone, 1993

Species of moth

Coleophora libyca is a moth of the family Coleophoridae. It is found in North Africa.
