= Coleophora lucida =

Scientific classification
- Kingdom: Animalia
- Phylum: Arthropoda
- Clade: Pancrustacea
- Class: Insecta
- Order: Lepidoptera
- Family: Coleophoridae
- Genus: Coleophora
- Species: C. lucida

Binomial name
- Coleophora lucida Baldizzone, 1989

Species of moth

Coleophora lucida is a moth of the family Coleophoridae. It is found in Zhejiang in eastern China.

The wingspan is about 10 mm.
