= Coleophora ucrainae =

Scientific classification
- Kingdom: Animalia
- Phylum: Arthropoda
- Clade: Pancrustacea
- Class: Insecta
- Order: Lepidoptera
- Family: Coleophoridae
- Genus: Coleophora
- Species: C. ucrainae

Binomial name
- Coleophora ucrainae Baldizzone & Patzak, 1991

Species of moth

Coleophora ucrainae is a moth of the family Coleophoridae. It is found in Ukraine.
