= Coleophora armeniae =

Scientific classification
- Kingdom: Animalia
- Phylum: Arthropoda
- Clade: Pancrustacea
- Class: Insecta
- Order: Lepidoptera
- Family: Coleophoridae
- Genus: Coleophora
- Species: C. armeniae

Binomial name
- Coleophora armeniae Baldizzone & Patzak, 1991

Species of moth

Coleophora armeniae is a moth of the family Coleophoridae that can be found in southern part of Russia, Ukraine, and in Asian countries such as Armenia, China, Kazakhstan, Kyrgyzstan and Turkey.

Adults are on wing in August.
