= Coleophora accadica =

Scientific classification
- Kingdom: Animalia
- Phylum: Arthropoda
- Clade: Pancrustacea
- Class: Insecta
- Order: Lepidoptera
- Family: Coleophoridae
- Genus: Coleophora
- Species: C. accadica

Binomial name
- Coleophora accadica (Baldizzone, 1994)

Species of moth

Coleophora accadica is a moth of the family Coleophoridae.
