= Coleophora kenyaensis =

Scientific classification
- Kingdom: Animalia
- Phylum: Arthropoda
- Clade: Pancrustacea
- Class: Insecta
- Order: Lepidoptera
- Family: Coleophoridae
- Genus: Coleophora
- Species: C. kenyaensis

Binomial name
- Coleophora kenyaensis Baldizzone & van der Wolf, 2015

Species of moth

Coleophora kenyaensis is a species of moth in the family Coleophoridae. It is found in Kenya.
