= Coleophora verbljushkella =

Scientific classification
- Kingdom: Animalia
- Phylum: Arthropoda
- Clade: Pancrustacea
- Class: Insecta
- Order: Lepidoptera
- Family: Coleophoridae
- Genus: Coleophora
- Species: C. verbljushkella

Binomial name
- Coleophora verbljushkella Baldizzone & Tabell, 2007

Species of moth

Coleophora verbljushkella is a moth of the family Coleophoridae. It is found in the southern Ural Mountains in Russia.
