= Coleophora orenburgella =

Scientific classification
- Kingdom: Animalia
- Phylum: Arthropoda
- Clade: Pancrustacea
- Class: Insecta
- Order: Lepidoptera
- Family: Coleophoridae
- Genus: Coleophora
- Species: C. orenburgella

Binomial name
- Coleophora orenburgella Baldizzone & Tabell, 2007

Species of moth

Coleophora orenburgella is a moth of the family Coleophoridae. It is found in the southern Ural Mountains and the Altai Mountains in Russia.

Adults have been recorded from May to mid-June.

== Etymology ==
The species name refers to the Orenburg district, where the majority of the type specimens were collected.
