= Coleophora buteella =

Scientific classification
- Kingdom: Animalia
- Phylum: Arthropoda
- Clade: Pancrustacea
- Class: Insecta
- Order: Lepidoptera
- Family: Coleophoridae
- Genus: Coleophora
- Species: C. buteella

Binomial name
- Coleophora buteella Baldizzone, 1989

Species of moth

Coleophora buteella is a moth of the family Coleophoridae. It is found in Yunnan in southern China.

The wingspan is 10–11 mm.
