= Coleophora plurispinella =

Scientific classification
- Kingdom: Animalia
- Phylum: Arthropoda
- Clade: Pancrustacea
- Class: Insecta
- Order: Lepidoptera
- Family: Coleophoridae
- Genus: Coleophora
- Species: C. plurispinella

Binomial name
- Coleophora plurispinella Baldizzone, 1989

Species of moth

Coleophora plurispinella is a moth of the family Coleophoridae. It is found in Shandong, eastern China.

The wingspan is about 13 mm.
