= Coleophora eurasiatica =

Scientific classification
- Kingdom: Animalia
- Phylum: Arthropoda
- Clade: Pancrustacea
- Class: Insecta
- Order: Lepidoptera
- Family: Coleophoridae
- Genus: Coleophora
- Species: C. eurasiatica

Binomial name
- Coleophora eurasiatica Baldizzone, 1989

Synonyms
- Aporiptura eurasiatica (Baldizzone, 1989)

Species of moth

Coleophora eurasiatica is a moth of the family Coleophoridae. It is found in Hungary, southern Russia, China and Korea. It occurs in steppe biotopes.

The wingspan is 8–10 mm. Adults are on wing in June.

The larvae feed on the leaves of Kochia proslata.
