= Coleophora amikanella =

Scientific classification
- Kingdom: Animalia
- Phylum: Arthropoda
- Clade: Pancrustacea
- Class: Insecta
- Order: Lepidoptera
- Family: Coleophoridae
- Genus: Coleophora
- Species: C. amikanella

Binomial name
- Coleophora amikanella Baldizzone, 1988

Species of moth

Coleophora amikanella is a moth of the family Coleophoridae. It is found in North Africa.
