= Coleophora albadomina =

Scientific classification
- Kingdom: Animalia
- Phylum: Arthropoda
- Clade: Pancrustacea
- Class: Insecta
- Order: Lepidoptera
- Family: Coleophoridae
- Genus: Coleophora
- Species: C. albadomina

Binomial name
- Coleophora albadomina Baldizzone & van der Wolf, 2004

Species of moth

Coleophora albadomina is a moth of the family Coleophoridae that was first described by Giorgio Baldizzone and Hugo van der Wolf in 2004. It is endemic to Namibia.
