= Coleophora hinnula =

Scientific classification
- Kingdom: Animalia
- Phylum: Arthropoda
- Clade: Pancrustacea
- Class: Insecta
- Order: Lepidoptera
- Family: Coleophoridae
- Genus: Coleophora
- Species: C. hinnula

Binomial name
- Coleophora hinnula Baldizzone, 1995

Species of moth

Coleophora hinnula is a moth of the family Coleophoridae.
