= Coleophora pandionella =

Scientific classification
- Kingdom: Animalia
- Phylum: Arthropoda
- Clade: Pancrustacea
- Class: Insecta
- Order: Lepidoptera
- Family: Coleophoridae
- Genus: Coleophora
- Species: C. pandionella

Binomial name
- Coleophora pandionella Baldizzone, 1988

Species of moth

Coleophora pandionella is a moth of the family Coleophoridae. It is found in Russia and China.
