= Coleophora cnossiaca =

Scientific classification
- Kingdom: Animalia
- Phylum: Arthropoda
- Clade: Pancrustacea
- Class: Insecta
- Order: Lepidoptera
- Family: Coleophoridae
- Genus: Coleophora
- Species: C. cnossiaca

Binomial name
- Coleophora cnossiaca Baldizzone, 1983

Species of moth

Coleophora cnossiaca is a moth of the family Coleophoridae. It is found on Crete.
