= Coleophora kotalensis =

Scientific classification
- Kingdom: Animalia
- Phylum: Arthropoda
- Clade: Pancrustacea
- Class: Insecta
- Order: Lepidoptera
- Family: Coleophoridae
- Genus: Coleophora
- Species: C. kotalensis

Binomial name
- Coleophora kotalensis Baldizzone, 1994

Species of moth

Coleophora kotalensis is a moth of the family Coleophoridae.
