= Coleophora buettikeri =

Scientific classification
- Kingdom: Animalia
- Phylum: Arthropoda
- Clade: Pancrustacea
- Class: Insecta
- Order: Lepidoptera
- Family: Coleophoridae
- Genus: Coleophora
- Species: C. buettikeri

Binomial name
- Coleophora buettikeri Baldizzone, 1990

Species of moth

Coleophora buettikeri is a moth of the family Coleophoridae. It is found in Saudi Arabia. It has a wingspan of 15 mm.
