= Coleophora baischi =

Scientific classification
- Kingdom: Animalia
- Phylum: Arthropoda
- Clade: Pancrustacea
- Class: Insecta
- Order: Lepidoptera
- Family: Coleophoridae
- Genus: Coleophora
- Species: C. baischi

Binomial name
- Coleophora baischi Baldizzone, 2007

Species of moth

Coleophora baischi is a moth of the family Coleophoridae. It is found in Turkey.

The wingspan is about 15 mm.
