= Coleophora damarella =

Scientific classification
- Kingdom: Animalia
- Phylum: Arthropoda
- Clade: Pancrustacea
- Class: Insecta
- Order: Lepidoptera
- Family: Coleophoridae
- Genus: Coleophora
- Species: C. damarella

Binomial name
- Coleophora damarella Baldizzone & van der Wolf, 2004

Species of moth

Coleophora damarella is a moth of the family Coleophoridae that is endemic to Namibia.
