= Coleophora bogdoensis =

Scientific classification
- Kingdom: Animalia
- Phylum: Arthropoda
- Clade: Pancrustacea
- Class: Insecta
- Order: Lepidoptera
- Family: Coleophoridae
- Genus: Coleophora
- Species: C. bogdoensis

Binomial name
- Coleophora bogdoensis Baldizzone & Tabell, 2007

Species of moth

Coleophora bogdoensis is a moth of the family Coleophoridae. It is found in the Schibendy valley in the southern Ural Mountains and the Baskunzak salt lake in the lower Volga region of Russia. It has also been recorded from north-western Kazakhstan.
