= Coleophora glareolella =

Scientific classification
- Kingdom: Animalia
- Phylum: Arthropoda
- Clade: Pancrustacea
- Class: Insecta
- Order: Lepidoptera
- Family: Coleophoridae
- Genus: Coleophora
- Species: C. glareolella

Binomial name
- Coleophora glareolella Baldizzone, 1989

Species of moth

Coleophora glareolella is a moth of the family Coleophoridae. It is found in Afghanistan.

The wingspan is about 16 mm.
