= Coleophora tunisiae =

Scientific classification
- Kingdom: Animalia
- Phylum: Arthropoda
- Clade: Pancrustacea
- Class: Insecta
- Order: Lepidoptera
- Family: Coleophoridae
- Genus: Coleophora
- Species: C. tunisiae

Binomial name
- Coleophora tunisiae Baldizzone & Stübner, 2007

Species of moth

Coleophora tunisiae is a moth of the family Coleophoridae. It is found in Tunisia and Algeria.

The length of the forewings is about 6 mm for males and about 5.5 mm for females. Adults have been recorded in May.
