= Coleophora vansoni =

Scientific classification
- Kingdom: Animalia
- Phylum: Arthropoda
- Clade: Pancrustacea
- Class: Insecta
- Order: Lepidoptera
- Family: Coleophoridae
- Genus: Coleophora
- Species: C. vansoni

Binomial name
- Coleophora vansoni Baldizzone & van der Wolf, 2015

Species of moth

Coleophora vansoni is a species of moth in the family Coleophoridae. It is found in Namibia and South Africa (Northern Cape, Eastern Cape, Western Cape).
