= Coleophora spartana =

Scientific classification
- Kingdom: Animalia
- Phylum: Arthropoda
- Clade: Pancrustacea
- Class: Insecta
- Order: Lepidoptera
- Family: Coleophoridae
- Genus: Coleophora
- Species: C. spartana

Binomial name
- Coleophora spartana Baldizzone, 2010

Species of moth

Coleophora spartana is a moth of the family Coleophoridae. It is found in Greece (Lakonia Mountain).
