= Coleophora persana =

Scientific classification
- Kingdom: Animalia
- Phylum: Arthropoda
- Clade: Pancrustacea
- Class: Insecta
- Order: Lepidoptera
- Family: Coleophoridae
- Genus: Coleophora
- Species: C. persana

Binomial name
- Coleophora persana Baldizzone, 1990

Species of moth

Coleophora persana is a moth of the family Coleophoridae.
