= Coleophora olympica =

Scientific classification
- Kingdom: Animalia
- Phylum: Arthropoda
- Clade: Pancrustacea
- Class: Insecta
- Order: Lepidoptera
- Family: Coleophoridae
- Genus: Coleophora
- Species: C. olympica

Binomial name
- Coleophora olympica Baldizzone, 1983

Species of moth

Coleophora olympica is a moth of the family Coleophoridae. It is found Greece.

The larvae possibly feed on the leaves of Cytisanthus radiatus.
