= Coleophora surniella =

Scientific classification
- Kingdom: Animalia
- Phylum: Arthropoda
- Clade: Pancrustacea
- Class: Insecta
- Order: Lepidoptera
- Family: Coleophoridae
- Genus: Coleophora
- Species: C. surniella

Binomial name
- Coleophora surniella Baldizzone, 1990

Species of moth

Coleophora surniella is a moth of the family Coleophoridae. It is found in the Arabian Peninsula and has a wingspan of 9 mm. Its head, thorax, and abdomen are a uniform brown colour.
