= Coleophora beduina =

Scientific classification
- Kingdom: Animalia
- Phylum: Arthropoda
- Clade: Pancrustacea
- Class: Insecta
- Order: Lepidoptera
- Family: Coleophoridae
- Genus: Coleophora
- Species: C. beduina

Binomial name
- Coleophora beduina Baldizzone, 1987

Species of moth

Coleophora beduina is a moth of the family Coleophoridae. It is found in Algeria, Tunisia and Libya.

The larvae feed on Hammada schwienfurthi. They feed on the shoots and possibly also on the fruits of their host plant.
