= Coleophora monticola =

Scientific classification
- Kingdom: Animalia
- Phylum: Arthropoda
- Clade: Pancrustacea
- Class: Insecta
- Order: Lepidoptera
- Family: Coleophoridae
- Genus: Coleophora
- Species: C. monticola

Binomial name
- Coleophora monticola Baldizzone & van der Wolf, 2004

Species of moth

Coleophora monticola is a moth of the family Coleophoridae. It is found in Namibia.
