= Coleophora tibetana =

Scientific classification
- Kingdom: Animalia
- Phylum: Arthropoda
- Clade: Pancrustacea
- Class: Insecta
- Order: Lepidoptera
- Family: Coleophoridae
- Genus: Coleophora
- Species: C. tibetana

Binomial name
- Coleophora tibetana Baldizzone, 1989

Species of moth

Coleophora tibetana is a moth of the family Coleophoridae. It is found in Tibet.

The wingspan is 18–19 mm. The larval host plant is unknown.
