= Coleophora tetraciliata =

Scientific classification
- Kingdom: Animalia
- Phylum: Arthropoda
- Clade: Pancrustacea
- Class: Insecta
- Order: Lepidoptera
- Family: Coleophoridae
- Genus: Coleophora
- Species: C. tetraciliata

Binomial name
- Coleophora tetraciliata Baldizzone, 2007

Species of moth

Coleophora tetraciliata is a moth of the family Coleophoridae. It is found in Lebanon, Iran and Turkey.

The wingspan is 14–16 mm.
