= Coleophora curvirostra =

Scientific classification
- Kingdom: Animalia
- Phylum: Arthropoda
- Clade: Pancrustacea
- Class: Insecta
- Order: Lepidoptera
- Family: Coleophoridae
- Genus: Coleophora
- Species: C. curvirostra

Binomial name
- Coleophora curvirostra Baldizzone, 1997

Species of moth

Coleophora curvirostra is a moth of the family Coleophoridae.
