= Haplochrois buvati =

Scientific classification
- Kingdom: Animalia
- Phylum: Arthropoda
- Clade: Pancrustacea
- Class: Insecta
- Order: Lepidoptera
- Family: Elachistidae
- Genus: Haplochrois
- Species: H. buvati

Binomial name
- Haplochrois buvati (Baldizzone, 1985)

Synonyms
- Aetia buvati Baldizzone, 1985

Species of moth

Haplochrois buvati is a species of moth of the family Elachistidae. It is found in south-western Europe.

The wingspan is 13–18 mm. Adults have been recorded from mid-August to mid-October.

The food plant is unknown.
