= Coleophora alecturella =

Scientific classification
- Kingdom: Animalia
- Phylum: Arthropoda
- Clade: Pancrustacea
- Class: Insecta
- Order: Lepidoptera
- Family: Coleophoridae
- Genus: Coleophora
- Species: C. alecturella

Binomial name
- Coleophora alecturella Baldizzone, 1989

Species of insect

Coleophora alecturella is a moth of the family Coleophoridae that is endemic to Tibet, China.
