= Coleophora zophodella =

Scientific classification
- Kingdom: Animalia
- Phylum: Arthropoda
- Clade: Pancrustacea
- Class: Insecta
- Order: Lepidoptera
- Family: Coleophoridae
- Genus: Coleophora
- Species: C. zophodella

Binomial name
- Coleophora zophodella Baldizzone, 2001

Synonyms
- Coleophora zofodella

Species of moth

Coleophora zophodella is a moth of the family Coleophoridae. It is found in Turkey.
