= Coleophora conspersa =

Scientific classification
- Kingdom: Animalia
- Phylum: Arthropoda
- Clade: Pancrustacea
- Class: Insecta
- Order: Lepidoptera
- Family: Coleophoridae
- Genus: Coleophora
- Species: C. conspersa

Binomial name
- Coleophora conspersa Baldizzone & Tabell, 1999

Species of moth

Coleophora conspersa is a moth of the family Coleophoridae. It is found in Turkey.

The larvae of the Coleophora conspersa feed on Phlomis lycia. They feed on the leaves of their host plant.
