= Coleophora calandrella =

Scientific classification
- Kingdom: Animalia
- Phylum: Arthropoda
- Clade: Pancrustacea
- Class: Insecta
- Order: Lepidoptera
- Family: Coleophoridae
- Genus: Coleophora
- Species: C. calandrella

Binomial name
- Coleophora calandrella Baldizzone, 1982

Species of moth

Coleophora calandrella is a moth of the family Coleophoridae that is endemic to Morocco.
