= Coleophora kamiesella =

Scientific classification
- Kingdom: Animalia
- Phylum: Arthropoda
- Clade: Pancrustacea
- Class: Insecta
- Order: Lepidoptera
- Family: Coleophoridae
- Genus: Coleophora
- Species: C. kamiesella

Binomial name
- Coleophora kamiesella Baldizzone & van der Wolf, 2015

Species of moth

Coleophora kamiesella is a species of moth in the family Coleophoridae. It is found in Namibia and South Africa, where it has been recorded from the Northern Cape.
