= Coleophora sittella =

Scientific classification
- Kingdom: Animalia
- Phylum: Arthropoda
- Clade: Pancrustacea
- Class: Insecta
- Order: Lepidoptera
- Family: Coleophoridae
- Genus: Coleophora
- Species: C. sittella

Binomial name
- Coleophora sittella Baldizzone, 1989

Species of moth

Coleophora sittella is a moth of the family Coleophoridae. It is found in south-western and eastern China.

The wingspan is about 12–13 mm.
