= Coleophora patzaki =

Scientific classification
- Kingdom: Animalia
- Phylum: Arthropoda
- Clade: Pancrustacea
- Class: Insecta
- Order: Lepidoptera
- Family: Coleophoridae
- Genus: Coleophora
- Species: C. patzaki

Binomial name
- Coleophora patzaki Baldizzone, 2001

Species of moth

Coleophora patzaki is a moth of the family Coleophoridae that is endemic to Greece.
