= Coleophora arkaimella =

Scientific classification
- Kingdom: Animalia
- Phylum: Arthropoda
- Clade: Pancrustacea
- Class: Insecta
- Order: Lepidoptera
- Family: Coleophoridae
- Genus: Coleophora
- Species: C. arkaimella

Binomial name
- Coleophora arkaimella Baldizzone & Tabell, 2007

Species of moth

Coleophora arkaimella is a moth of the family Coleophoridae. It is found in the southern Ural Mountains in Russia.

The wingspan is 14-15.5 mm.
