= Coleophora pokrovkella =

Scientific classification
- Kingdom: Animalia
- Phylum: Arthropoda
- Clade: Pancrustacea
- Class: Insecta
- Order: Lepidoptera
- Family: Coleophoridae
- Genus: Coleophora
- Species: C. pokrovkella

Binomial name
- Coleophora pokrovkella Baldizzone & Tabell, 2007

Species of moth

Coleophora pokrovkella is a moth of the family Coleophoridae. It lives in the southern Ural Mountains in Russia.

The wingspan is 14.5-15.5 mm.
