= Coleophora crexella =

Scientific classification
- Kingdom: Animalia
- Phylum: Arthropoda
- Clade: Pancrustacea
- Class: Insecta
- Order: Lepidoptera
- Family: Coleophoridae
- Genus: Coleophora
- Species: C. crexella

Binomial name
- Coleophora crexella Baldizzone, 1987

Species of moth

Coleophora crexella is a moth of the family Coleophoridae that can be found in Algeria, Libya and Tunisia.

The larvae feed on Traganum nudatum. They feed on the leaves of their host plant.
