= Coleophora nepetae =

Scientific classification
- Kingdom: Animalia
- Phylum: Arthropoda
- Clade: Pancrustacea
- Class: Insecta
- Order: Lepidoptera
- Family: Coleophoridae
- Genus: Coleophora
- Species: C. nepetae

Binomial name
- Coleophora nepetae Baldizzone, 1994

Species of moth

Coleophora nepetae is a moth of the family Coleophoridae. It is found in Afghanistan.

The larvae feed on Nepeta honigbergeri. They feed on the leaves of their host plant.
