= Coleophora teregnathella =

Scientific classification
- Kingdom: Animalia
- Phylum: Arthropoda
- Clade: Pancrustacea
- Class: Insecta
- Order: Lepidoptera
- Family: Coleophoridae
- Genus: Coleophora
- Species: C. teregnathella

Binomial name
- Coleophora teregnathella Baldizzone & Savenkov, 2002

Species of moth

Coleophora teregnathella is a moth of the family Coleophoridae. It is found in the Russian Far East.

The wingspan is about 12–13 mm (0.47–0.51 in).
