= Coleophora namaqua =

Scientific classification
- Kingdom: Animalia
- Phylum: Arthropoda
- Clade: Pancrustacea
- Class: Insecta
- Order: Lepidoptera
- Family: Coleophoridae
- Genus: Coleophora
- Species: C. namaqua

Binomial name
- Coleophora namaqua Baldizzone & van der Wolf, 2015

Species of moth

Coleophora namaqua is a species of moth in the family Coleophoridae. It is found in South Africa, where it has been recorded from the Northern Cape.
