= Haplochrois otiosa =

Scientific classification
- Domain: Eukaryota
- Kingdom: Animalia
- Phylum: Arthropoda
- Class: Insecta
- Order: Lepidoptera
- Family: Elachistidae
- Genus: Haplochrois
- Species: H. otiosa

Binomial name
- Haplochrois otiosa (Walsingham, 1909)

Synonyms
- Eritarbes otiosa Walsingham, 1909

Species of moth

Haplochrois otiosa is a moth in the family Elachistidae. It is found in Mexico.
