= Haplochrois thalycra =

Scientific classification
- Kingdom: Animalia
- Phylum: Arthropoda
- Class: Insecta
- Order: Lepidoptera
- Family: Elachistidae
- Genus: Haplochrois
- Species: H. thalycra

Binomial name
- Haplochrois thalycra Meyrick, 1897

Species of moth

Haplochrois thalycra is a moth in the family Elachistidae. It was described by Edward Meyrick in 1897. It is found in Australia, where it has been recorded from New South Wales.
