= Haplochrois hysterota =

Scientific classification
- Kingdom: Animalia
- Phylum: Arthropoda
- Clade: Pancrustacea
- Class: Insecta
- Order: Lepidoptera
- Family: Elachistidae
- Genus: Haplochrois
- Species: H. hysterota

Binomial name
- Haplochrois hysterota (Meyrick, 1918)

Synonyms
- Platybathra hysterota Meyrick, 1918

Species of moth

Haplochrois hysterota is a moth in the family Elachistidae. It was described by Edward Meyrick in 1918. It is found in South Africa.
