= Coleophora corsicella =

Scientific classification
- Kingdom: Animalia
- Phylum: Arthropoda
- Class: Insecta
- Order: Lepidoptera
- Family: Coleophoridae
- Genus: Coleophora
- Species: C. corsicella

Binomial name
- Coleophora corsicella Walsingham, 1898

Synonyms
- Coleophora flavescentella Toll, 1961; Coleophora calcariella Chrétien, 1901

Species of moth

Coleophora corsicella is a moth of the family Coleophoridae. It is found from France to Italy and Greece and from Slovakia to the Iberian Peninsula.

The larvae feed on Agrostemma, Lychnis viscaria, Silene italica and Silene viscosa.
