= Haplochrois albanica =

Scientific classification
- Domain: Eukaryota
- Kingdom: Animalia
- Phylum: Arthropoda
- Class: Insecta
- Order: Lepidoptera
- Family: Elachistidae
- Genus: Haplochrois
- Species: H. albanica

Binomial name
- Haplochrois albanica (Rebel & Zerny, 1932)

Synonyms
- Tetanocentria albanica Rebel & Zerny, 1932

Species of moth

Haplochrois albanica is a species of moth of the family Elachistidae. It is found in southern and central Europe.

The wingspan is 11–12 mm. Adults have been recorded from June to August.

The food plant is unknown.
