= Haplochrois galapagosalis =

Scientific classification
- Kingdom: Animalia
- Phylum: Arthropoda
- Clade: Pancrustacea
- Class: Insecta
- Order: Lepidoptera
- Family: Elachistidae
- Genus: Haplochrois
- Species: H. galapagosalis

Binomial name
- Haplochrois galapagosalis B. Landry, 2001

Species of moth

Haplochrois galapagosalis is a moth in the family Elachistidae. It was described by Bernard Landry in 2001. It is found on the Galápagos Islands.

The length of the forewings is 4–6 mm. Adults have been recorded on wing from January to May.

== Etymology ==
The species is named for the Ecuadorian archipelago where it was collected.
