= Haplochrois bipunctella =

Scientific classification
- Kingdom: Animalia
- Phylum: Arthropoda
- Clade: Pancrustacea
- Class: Insecta
- Order: Lepidoptera
- Family: Elachistidae
- Genus: Haplochrois
- Species: H. bipunctella

Binomial name
- Haplochrois bipunctella (Chambers, 1880)

Synonyms
- Tetanocentria bipunctella; Aetia bipunctella Chambers, 1880; Chaetocampa crotonella Bottimer, 1926; Aetia crotonella

Species of moth

Haplochrois bipunctella is a moth of the family Elachistidae. It is found in North America, including Arizona, Mississippi, New Mexico, Oklahoma and Texas.

Adults are on wing from May to September.

The larvae feed on Croton engelmannii. They create leaf petiole galls and mine the seeds of their host plant.
