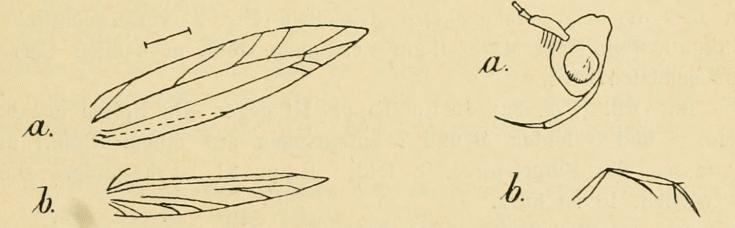

Scientific classification
- Kingdom: Animalia
- Phylum: Arthropoda
- Class: Insecta
- Order: Lepidoptera
- Family: Elachistidae
- Genus: Haplochrois; Meyrick, 1897

Synonyms
- Aethia Chambers, 1880; Eritarbes Walsingham, 1909; Rhadinastis Meyrick, 1897; Tetanocentria Rebel, 1902; Platybathra Meyrick, 1911; Parametriotes Kusnezov, 1916; Syntetrernis Meyrick, 1922

= Haplochrois =

Genus of moths

Haplochrois is a genus of moths in the family Elachistidae, though some classifications place it in the Agonoxenidae, Coleophoridae or Cosmopterigidae.

== Selected species ==
- Haplochrois albanica (Rebel & Zerny, 1932)
- Haplochrois bipunctella (Chambers, 1880)
- Haplochrois buvati Baldizzone, 1985
- Haplochrois chlorometalla Meyrick, 1897
- Haplochrois coleophorella (Sinev, 1993)
- Haplochrois galapagosalis Landry, 2001
- Haplochrois ganota (Meyrick, 1911)
- Haplochrois gelechiella Rebel, 1902
- Haplochrois guttata Busck, 1914
- Haplochrois halans (Meyrick, 1924)
- Haplochrois hysterota (Meyrick, 1918)
- Haplochrois ochraceella Rebel, 1903
- Haplochrois otiosa Walsingham, 1909
- Haplochrois picropa (Meyrick, 1921)
- Haplochrois tanyptera Turner, 1923
- Haplochrois thalycra Meyrick, 1897
- Haplochrois theae (Kusnezov, 1916)
