= Haplochrois picropa =

Scientific classification
- Kingdom: Animalia
- Phylum: Arthropoda
- Class: Insecta
- Order: Lepidoptera
- Family: Elachistidae
- Genus: Haplochrois
- Species: H. picropa

Binomial name
- Haplochrois picropa (Meyrick, 1921)

Synonyms
- Platybathra picropa Meyrick, 1921

Species of moth

Haplochrois picropa is a moth in the family Elachistidae. It was described by Edward Meyrick in 1921. It is found in Zimbabwe.
