= Haplochrois coleophorella =

Scientific classification
- Kingdom: Animalia
- Phylum: Arthropoda
- Clade: Pancrustacea
- Class: Insecta
- Order: Lepidoptera
- Family: Elachistidae
- Genus: Haplochrois
- Species: H. coleophorella

Binomial name
- Haplochrois coleophorella (Sinev, 1993)

Synonyms
- Tetanocentria coleophorella Sinev, 1993

Species of moth

Haplochrois coleophorella is a moth in the family Elachistidae. It was described by Sinev in 1993. It is found in Russia.
