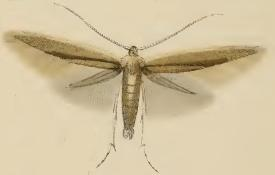

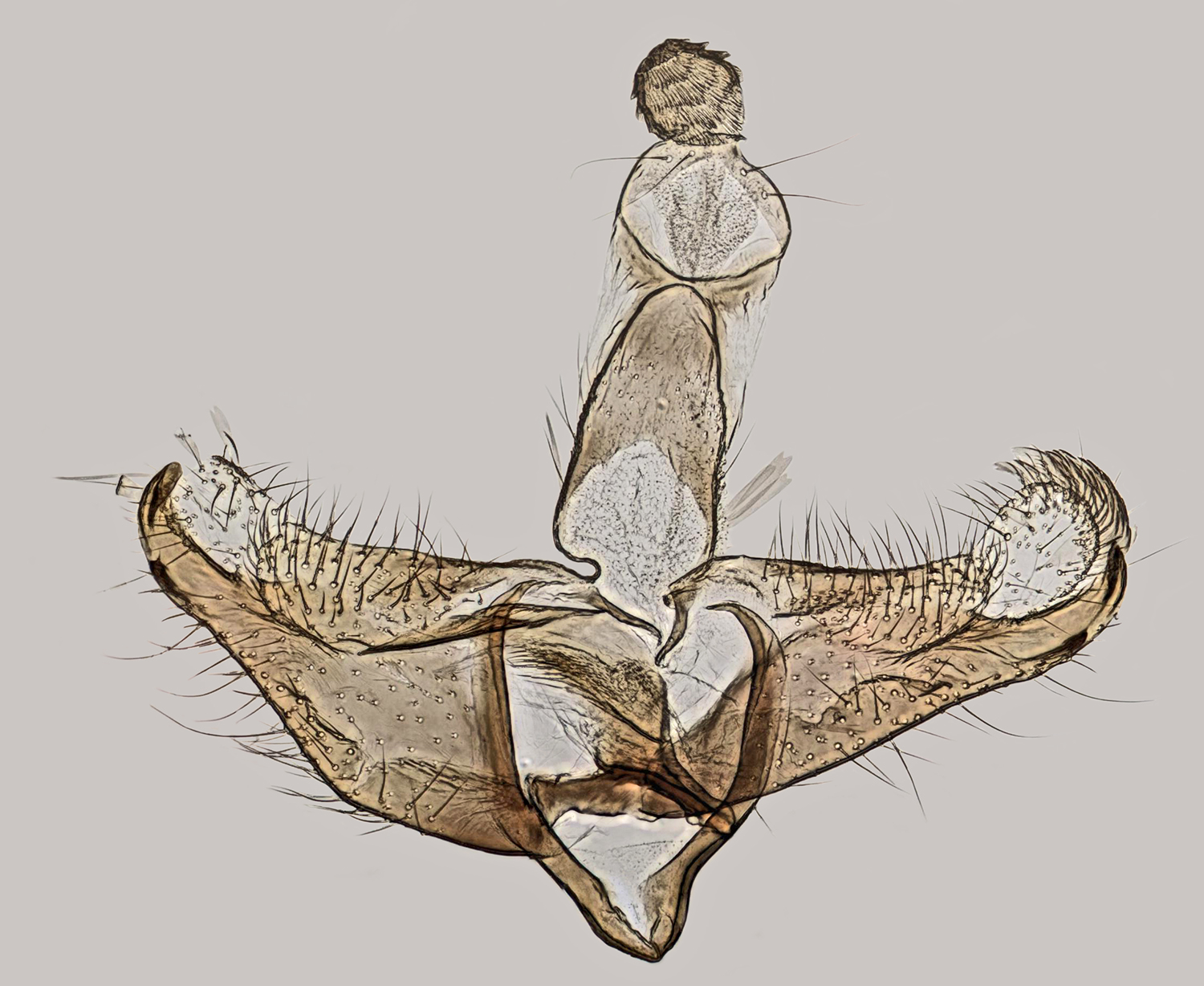
- Coleophora milvipennis male genitalia, Tregarron bog, Wales,

Scientific classification
- Kingdom: Animalia
- Phylum: Arthropoda
- Class: Insecta
- Order: Lepidoptera
- Family: Coleophoridae
- Genus: Coleophora
- Species: C. milvipennis

Binomial name
- Coleophora milvipennis Zeller, 1839

Synonyms
- Eupista milvipennis

= Coleophora milvipennis =

Species of moth

Coleophora milvipennis is a moth of the family Coleophoridae. It is found in all of Europe, east to Japan (Hokkaido).

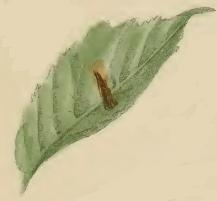
Elm leaf eaten by the larva

Larva

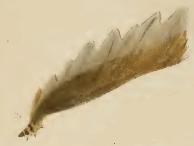
Larval case

The wingspan is 10–13 mm. It was previously thought to be the birch-feeding form of Coleophora limosipennella until the 1970s, when it was separated as a separate species. Adult moths have buff forewings with a whitish stripe along the costa.It is impossible to identify without microscopic examination of the genitalia.

Adults are on wing in one generation per year from late June to July.

The larvae feed on Alnus glutinosa, Alnus incana, Alnus viridis, Betula nana, Betula pubescens, Carpinus betulus, Corylus avellana and Myrica gale. Larvae can be found almost year-round.
