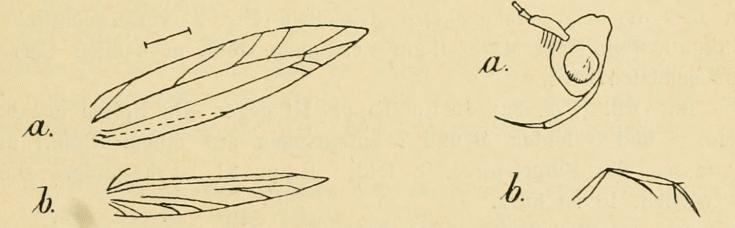
- Haplochrois gelechiella illustrations.

Scientific classification
- Domain: Eukaryota
- Kingdom: Animalia
- Phylum: Arthropoda
- Class: Insecta
- Order: Lepidoptera
- Family: Elachistidae
- Genus: Haplochrois
- Species: H. gelechiella

Binomial name
- Haplochrois gelechiella (Rebel, 1902)

Synonyms
- Tetanocentria gelechiella Rebel, 1902

= Haplochrois gelechiella =

Species of moth

Haplochrois gelechiella is a species of moth of the family Elachistidae. It is found in Greece.

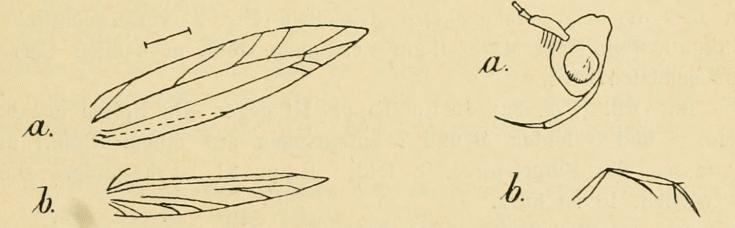
Illustrations of adult accompanying the original description

The wingspan is 12–14 mm. Adults have been recorded in July.

The food plant is unknown.
