= Haplochrois halans =

Scientific classification
- Kingdom: Animalia
- Phylum: Arthropoda
- Class: Insecta
- Order: Lepidoptera
- Family: Elachistidae
- Genus: Haplochrois
- Species: H. halans

Binomial name
- Haplochrois halans (Meyrick, 1924)

Synonyms
- Batrachedra halans Meyrick, 1924

Species of moth

Haplochrois halans is a moth in the family Elachistidae. It is found in South Africa.
