= Coleophora ispartae =

Scientific classification
- Kingdom: Animalia
- Phylum: Arthropoda
- Clade: Pancrustacea
- Class: Insecta
- Order: Lepidoptera
- Family: Coleophoridae
- Genus: Coleophora
- Species: C. ispartae

Binomial name
- Coleophora ispartae Baldizzone, 1994

Species of moth

Coleophora ispartae is a moth of the family Coleophoridae. It is found in Turkey.

The larvae feed on Artemisia species. They feed on the leaves of their host plant.
