= Haplochrois ganota =

Scientific classification
- Kingdom: Animalia
- Phylum: Arthropoda
- Class: Insecta
- Order: Lepidoptera
- Family: Elachistidae
- Genus: Haplochrois
- Species: H. ganota

Binomial name
- Haplochrois ganota (Meyrick, 1911)

Synonyms
- Platybathra ganota Meyrick, 1911

Species of moth

Haplochrois ganota is a moth in the family Elachistidae. It was described by Edward Meyrick in 1911. It is found in South Africa.
