= Haplochrois tanyptera =

Scientific classification
- Domain: Eukaryota
- Kingdom: Animalia
- Phylum: Arthropoda
- Class: Insecta
- Order: Lepidoptera
- Family: Elachistidae
- Genus: Haplochrois
- Species: H. tanyptera

Binomial name
- Haplochrois tanyptera Turner, 1923

Species of moth

Haplochrois tanyptera is a moth in the family Elachistidae. It was described by Alfred Jefferis Turner in 1923. It is found in Australia, where it has been recorded from Queensland.
