= Haplochrois ochraceella =

Scientific classification
- Domain: Eukaryota
- Kingdom: Animalia
- Phylum: Arthropoda
- Class: Insecta
- Order: Lepidoptera
- Family: Elachistidae
- Genus: Haplochrois
- Species: H. ochraceella

Binomial name
- Haplochrois ochraceella (Rebel, 1903)

Synonyms
- Tetanocentria ochraceella Rebel, 1902

Species of moth

Haplochrois ochraceella is a species of moth of the family Elachistidae. It is found in southern and central Europe.

The wingspan is 10–15 mm. Adults have been recorded from the beginning of June to the beginning of August.

The food plant is unknown.
