= Coleophora ivrizensis =

Scientific classification
- Kingdom: Animalia
- Phylum: Arthropoda
- Clade: Pancrustacea
- Class: Insecta
- Order: Lepidoptera
- Family: Coleophoridae
- Genus: Coleophora
- Species: C. ivrizensis

Binomial name
- Coleophora ivrizensis Baldizzone, 1994

Species of insect

Coleophora ivrizensis is a moth of the family Coleophoridae. It is found in Turkey.
