= Haplochrois guttata =

Scientific classification
- Domain: Eukaryota
- Kingdom: Animalia
- Phylum: Arthropoda
- Class: Insecta
- Order: Lepidoptera
- Family: Elachistidae
- Genus: Haplochrois
- Species: H. guttata

Binomial name
- Haplochrois guttata (Busck, 1914)

Synonyms
- Eritarbes guttata Busck, 1914

Species of moth

Haplochrois guttata is a moth in the family Elachistidae. It is found in Panama.
