= Coleophora gazella =

Scientific classification
- Kingdom: Animalia
- Phylum: Arthropoda
- Class: Insecta
- Order: Lepidoptera
- Family: Coleophoridae
- Genus: Coleophora
- Species: C. gazella

Binomial name
- Coleophora gazella (Toll, 1952)

Synonyms
- Coleophora gazella Toll & Amsel, 1967 (Junior primary homonym); Coleophora argandabella Amsel, 1968; Multicoloria gazella sinevi Reznik, 1989

Species of moth

Coleophora gazella is a moth of the family Coleophoridae. It is found in Turkestan, Afghanistan and Turkey.

The larvae feed on the leaves of Artemisia turanica, including f. diffusa in stony desert. Larvae can be found from the end of May to the beginning of June and (after diapause) again from April to May. Larvae hibernate.

== Subspecies ==
- Coleophora gazella gazella
- Coleophora gazella sinevi (Reznik, 1989)
