= Coleophora amethystinella =

Scientific classification
- Kingdom: Animalia
- Phylum: Arthropoda
- Class: Insecta
- Order: Lepidoptera
- Family: Coleophoridae
- Genus: Coleophora
- Species: C. amethystinella

Binomial name
- Coleophora amethystinella Ragonot, 1885

Synonyms
- Coleophora metallica Toll, 1961

Species of moth

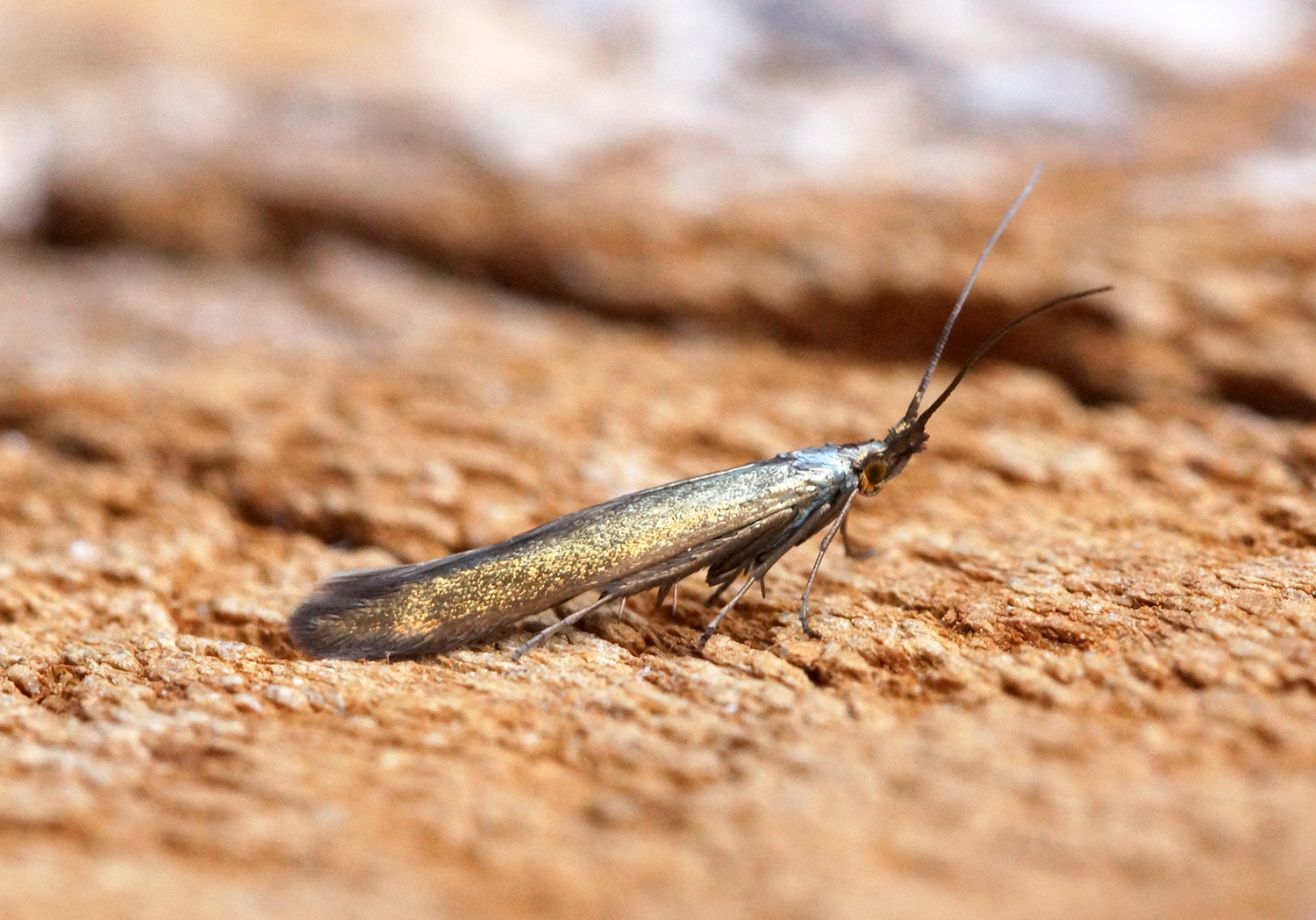

Coleophora amethystinella is a moth of the family Coleophoridae, found in Asia and Europe.

== Taxonomy ==
The species was previously considered to be a synonym of Coleophora fuscicornis.

== Description ==
The length of the forewings is 7–8.5 mm for males and 6.5–7 mm for females. Adults are on wing in June in western Europe.They feed within the seedpods of their host plant.

== Distribution ==
The moth has a disjunct distribution being found in the Mediterranean region from Portugal to Iraq. It was first recorded from Essex, England in 1973 and has since been found elsewhere in southern England.
