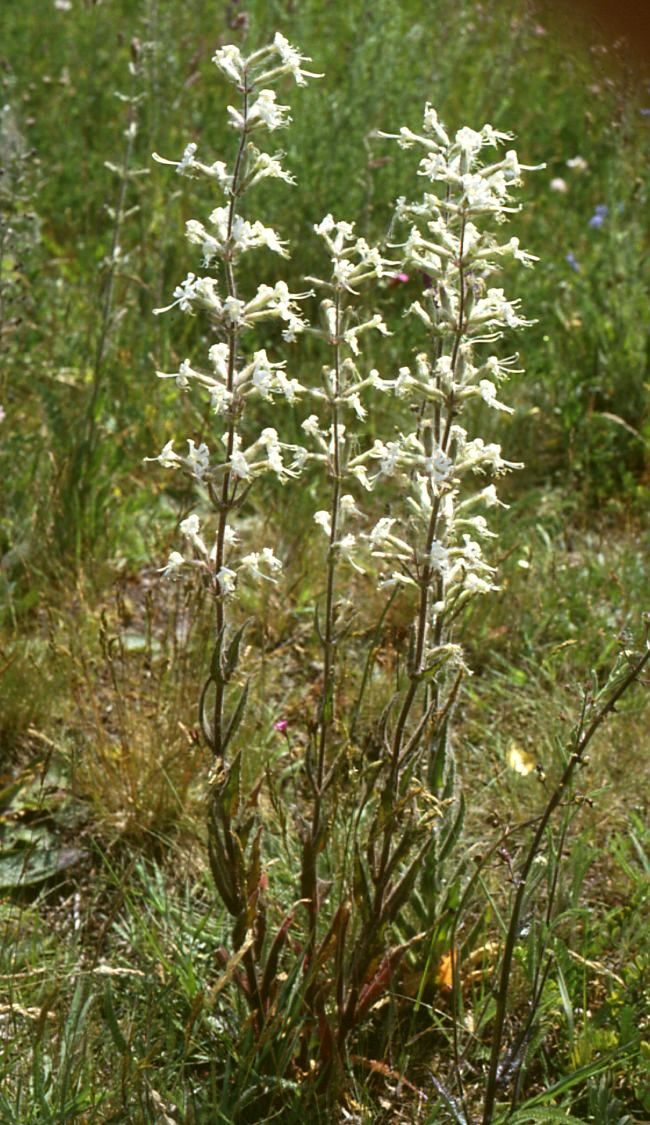
- Habit
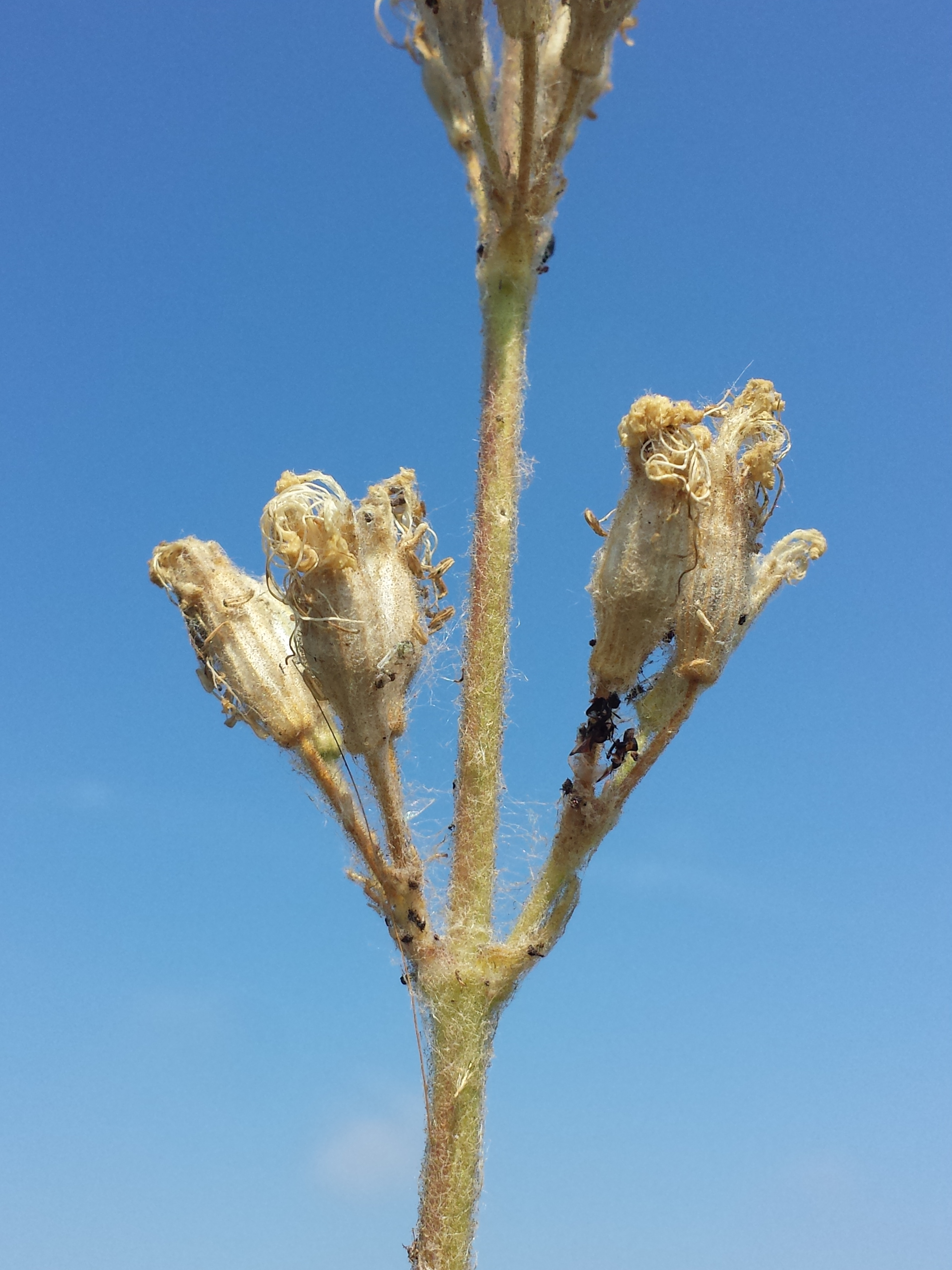
- Insects trapped on stem

Scientific classification
- Kingdom: Plantae
- Clade: Tracheophytes
- Clade: Angiosperms
- Clade: Eudicots
- Order: Caryophyllales
- Family: Caryophyllaceae
- Genus: Silene
- Species: S. viscosa

Binomial name
- Silene viscosa (L.) Pers.

Synonyms
- List: Carpophora viscosa (L.) Tzvelev; Carpophora viscosa var. kossinskyi Tzvelev; Carpophora viscosa var. krascheninnikovii Tzvelev; Cucubalus dubrensis Mill.; Cucubalus royenii M.Bieb.; Cucubalus viscidus Krock.; Cucubalus viscosus L.; Elisanthe viscosa (L.) Rupr.; Lychnis viscosa (L.) Scop.; Melandrium griffithii (Boiss.) Rohrb.; Melandrium viscosum (L.) Čelak.; Silene griffithii Boiss.; Silene royenii Pers.; Silene taurica Fisch. ex Sweet; Viscago glutinosa Baumg.; Viscago viscosa (L.) Moench

= Silene viscosa =

Species of plant

Silene viscosa, the white sticky catchfly, is a species of flowering plant in the family Caryophyllaceae. It is native to cool-temperate areas of eastern Europe, western Siberia, and western and central Asia, and has been introduced to Germany. Molecular analysis shows that it contains two highly divergent genetic lineages. There is a western lineage and an eastern lineage, suggesting that one is a cryptic species.
