= Coleophora albipennella =

Scientific classification
- Kingdom: Animalia
- Phylum: Arthropoda
- Class: Insecta
- Order: Lepidoptera
- Family: Coleophoridae
- Genus: Coleophora
- Species: C. albipennella

Binomial name
- Coleophora albipennella Staudinger, 1879

Species of moth

Coleophora albipennella is a moth of the family Coleophoridae. It is found in Asia Minor.
