= Coleophora albostraminata =

Scientific classification
- Kingdom: Animalia
- Phylum: Arthropoda
- Class: Insecta
- Order: Lepidoptera
- Family: Coleophoridae
- Genus: Coleophora
- Species: C. albostraminata

Binomial name
- Coleophora albostraminata Toll, 1960

Species of moth

Coleophora albostraminata is a moth of the family Coleophoridae. It is found in Spain.
