= Coleophora argyrella =

Scientific classification
- Kingdom: Animalia
- Phylum: Arthropoda
- Class: Insecta
- Order: Lepidoptera
- Family: Coleophoridae
- Genus: Coleophora
- Species: C. argyrella

Binomial name
- Coleophora argyrella Herrich-Schaffer, 1861

Species of moth

Coleophora argyrella is a moth of the family Coleophoridae. It is found in southern Russia and Syria.

The larvae feed on the shoots of Alhagi pseudalhagi.
