= Coleophora vulpecula =

Scientific classification
- Kingdom: Animalia
- Phylum: Arthropoda
- Clade: Pancrustacea
- Class: Insecta
- Order: Lepidoptera
- Family: Coleophoridae
- Genus: Coleophora
- Species: C. vulpecula

Binomial name
- Coleophora vulpecula Zeller, 1849

Synonyms
- Coleophora vulpeculoides Toll, 1952

Species of moth

Coleophora vulpecula is a moth of the family Coleophoridae. It is found from Germany to the Iberian Peninsula, Italy and Bulgaria. It has also been recorded from northern Russia.
