= Coleophora fuscicornis =

Scientific classification
- Kingdom: Animalia
- Phylum: Arthropoda
- Clade: Pancrustacea
- Class: Insecta
- Order: Lepidoptera
- Family: Coleophoridae
- Genus: Coleophora
- Species: C. fuscicornis

Binomial name
- Coleophora fuscicornis Lienig & Zeller, 1846

Species of moth

Coleophora fuscicornis is a moth of the family Coleophoridae. It is found on the Israel, Syria and Turkey. Records for Great Britain refer to Coleophora amethystinella.

The length of the forewings is 9-10.5 mm for males and 6.5 mm for females. Adults are on wing in March in Israel. Further north, the flight time is probably later in the year.
