= Coleophora asiaeminoris =

Scientific classification
- Kingdom: Animalia
- Phylum: Arthropoda
- Class: Insecta
- Order: Lepidoptera
- Family: Coleophoridae
- Genus: Coleophora
- Species: C. asiaeminoris

Binomial name
- Coleophora asiaeminoris Toll, 1952

Synonyms
- Coleophora asieaeminoris

Species of moth

Coleophora asiaeminoris is a moth of the family Coleophoridae that is endemic to Turkey.
