= Haplochrois theae =

Scientific classification
- Domain: Eukaryota
- Kingdom: Animalia
- Phylum: Arthropoda
- Class: Insecta
- Order: Lepidoptera
- Family: Elachistidae
- Genus: Haplochrois
- Species: H. theae

Binomial name
- Haplochrois theae (Kusnezov, 1916)

Synonyms
- Parametriotes theae Kusnezov, 1916

Species of moth

Haplochrois theae is a species of moth of the family Elachistidae. It is found from western Transcaucasia and Anatolia to China. It probably originated from Southeast Asia. During the 20th century, this species was a serious pest on tea plantations in Georgia and to a lesser degree, in the Krasnodar Territory of Russia.

The wingspan is 9–12 mm. Adults are on wing from June to August in one generation per year.

The larvae feed on Camellia, on which the species is considered a pest. They mine the leaves of their host plant.
