= Coleophora caucasica =

Scientific classification
- Kingdom: Animalia
- Phylum: Arthropoda
- Clade: Pancrustacea
- Class: Insecta
- Order: Lepidoptera
- Family: Coleophoridae
- Genus: Coleophora
- Species: C. caucasica

Binomial name
- Coleophora caucasica Stainton, 1867

Species of moth

Coleophora caucasica is a moth of the family Coleophoridae. It is found in Asia Minor.
