= Coleophora basimaculella =

Scientific classification
- Kingdom: Animalia
- Phylum: Arthropoda
- Class: Insecta
- Order: Lepidoptera
- Family: Coleophoridae
- Genus: Coleophora
- Species: C. basimaculella

Binomial name
- Coleophora basimaculella Mann, 1864

Species of moth

Coleophora basimaculella is a moth of the family Coleophoridae. It is found in south-eastern Europe and Asia Minor.

The length of the forewings is 5.5-7.5 mm for males and 4–5 mm for females. Adults are on wing in April and May.
