= Coleophora occatella =

Scientific classification
- Kingdom: Animalia
- Phylum: Arthropoda
- Class: Insecta
- Order: Lepidoptera
- Family: Coleophoridae
- Genus: Coleophora
- Species: C. occatella

Binomial name
- Coleophora occatella Staudinger, 1880

Synonyms
- Casignetella occatella

Species of moth

Coleophora occatella is a moth of the family Coleophoridae. It is found in Bulgaria, Romania, Ukraine and southern Russia.

Adults are on wing in May and August.
