= Coleophora isomoera =

Scientific classification
- Kingdom: Animalia
- Phylum: Arthropoda
- Class: Insecta
- Order: Lepidoptera
- Family: Coleophoridae
- Genus: Coleophora
- Species: C. isomoera

Binomial name
- Coleophora isomoera Falkovitsh, 1972

Species of moth

Coleophora isomoera is a moth of the family Coleophoridae. It is found in Spain and Morocco, Turkey, Uzbekistan, Mongolia and China.
