= Coleophora malatiella =

Scientific classification
- Kingdom: Animalia
- Phylum: Arthropoda
- Class: Insecta
- Order: Lepidoptera
- Family: Coleophoridae
- Genus: Coleophora
- Species: C. malatiella

Binomial name
- Coleophora malatiella Toll, 1952

Synonyms
- Coleophora aureliani Capuse, 1967

Species of moth

Coleophora malatiella is a moth of the family Coleophoridae. It is found in Romania and Turkey.
