= Coleophora wiltshirei =

Scientific classification
- Kingdom: Animalia
- Phylum: Arthropoda
- Class: Insecta
- Order: Lepidoptera
- Family: Coleophoridae
- Genus: Coleophora
- Species: C. wiltshirei

Binomial name
- Coleophora wiltshirei Toll, 1959

Species of moth

Coleophora wiltshirei is a moth of the family Coleophoridae. It is found in Turkey and Iraq.
