= Coleophora amasicola =

Scientific classification
- Kingdom: Animalia
- Phylum: Arthropoda
- Class: Insecta
- Order: Lepidoptera
- Family: Coleophoridae
- Genus: Coleophora
- Species: C. amasicola

Binomial name
- Coleophora amasicola Toll, 1942

Species of moth

Coleophora amasicola is a moth of the family Coleophoridae that is endemic to Turkey.
