= Coleophora minaxella =

Scientific classification
- Kingdom: Animalia
- Phylum: Arthropoda
- Class: Insecta
- Order: Lepidoptera
- Family: Coleophoridae
- Genus: Coleophora
- Species: C. minaxella

Binomial name
- Coleophora minaxella Toll, 1952

Species of moth

Coleophora minaxella is a moth of the family Coleophoridae. It is found in Turkey.
