= Coleophora pellicornella =

Scientific classification
- Kingdom: Animalia
- Phylum: Arthropoda
- Class: Insecta
- Order: Lepidoptera
- Family: Coleophoridae
- Genus: Coleophora
- Species: C. pellicornella

Binomial name
- Coleophora pellicornella Zerny, 1930

Species of moth

Coleophora pellicornella is a moth of the family Coleophoridae. It is found in Turkey, Spain, Portugal but also China.
