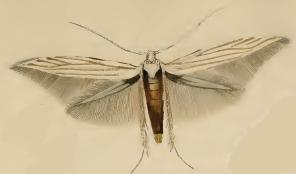

Scientific classification
- Kingdom: Animalia
- Phylum: Arthropoda
- Class: Insecta
- Order: Lepidoptera
- Family: Coleophoridae
- Genus: Coleophora
- Species: C. pennella

Binomial name
- Coleophora pennella (Denis & Schiffermuller, 1775)

Synonyms
- List: Tinea pennella Denis & Schiffermuller, 1775; Coleophora flavilineella Toll, 1952; Coleophora diffinis Staudinger, 1879; Phalaena (Tinea) borowskiella Goeze, 1783; Tinea mucosa Geoffroy in Fourcroy, 1785; Phalaena (Tinea) onosmella Brahm, 1791; Tinea onosmella Brahm, 1791; Tinea struthionipennella Hübner, 1796; Coleophora onosmella enervatella Zeller, 1849; Coleophora hispanicella Möschler, 1866; Coleophora nervosella Müller-Rutz, 1927; Coleophora gogovi Capuse, 1971

= Coleophora pennella =

Species of moth

Coleophora pennella is a moth of the family Coleophoridae. It is found in most of Europe.

The wingspan is 15–20 millimetres (0.59–0.79 in). Adults are on wing from June to July.

The larvae feed on alkanet (Anchusa officinalis), houndstongue (Cynoglossum officinale), Italian viper's bugloss (Echium italicum), viper's bugloss (Echium vulgare), common gromwell (Lithospermum officinale), forget-me-nots (Myosotis species), monkswort (Nonea species), Onosma, alkenet (Pentaglottis), lungwort (Pulmonaria officinalis) and common comfrey (Symphytum officinale). Full-grown larvae can be found from mid May to early June.

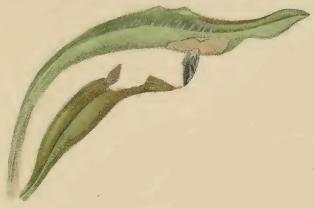
Leaves of Echium vulgare eaten by the larva, with two larval cases attached

Larva
