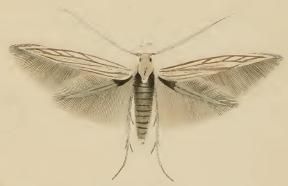

Scientific classification
- Kingdom: Animalia
- Phylum: Arthropoda
- Class: Insecta
- Order: Lepidoptera
- Family: Coleophoridae
- Genus: Coleophora
- Species: C. chamaedriella

Binomial name
- Coleophora chamaedriella Bruand, 1852

Synonyms
- Coleophora setipalpella Staudinger, 1879; Coleophora distinctella Toll, 1952

= Coleophora chamaedriella =

Species of moth

Coleophora chamaedriella is a moth of the family Coleophoridae. It is found from Poland to Spain, Sardinia, Italy and Greece.

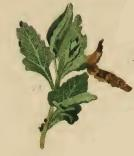
Sprig of Teucrium chamaedrys with a larval case attached to one of the leaves

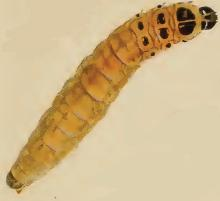
Larva

Larvae can be found from September to May.
