= Coleophora albotitae =

Scientific classification
- Kingdom: Animalia
- Phylum: Arthropoda
- Class: Insecta
- Order: Lepidoptera
- Family: Coleophoridae
- Genus: Coleophora
- Species: C. albotitae

Binomial name
- Coleophora albotitae Rebel, 1936

Species of moth

Coleophora albotitae is a moth of the family Coleophoridae that is endemic to Turkey.
