= Coleophora parthenica =

Scientific classification
- Kingdom: Animalia
- Phylum: Arthropoda
- Class: Insecta
- Order: Lepidoptera
- Family: Coleophoridae
- Genus: Coleophora
- Species: C. parthenica

Binomial name
- Coleophora parthenica Meyrick, 1891

Synonyms
- Coleophora cygnipennella Toll, 1957; Coleophora candidella Toll, 1959; Coleophora transcaspica Toll, 1959; Coleophora candidella Toll & Amsel, 1967 (Junior primary homonym of Coleophora candidella Toll, 1959); Coleophora lashkarella Toll & Amsel, 1967; Coleophora hilmendella Amsel, 1968 (Replacement name for Coleophora candidella Toll & Amsel, 1967)

Species of moth

Coleophora parthenica, the Russian thistle stem miner moth, is a moth of the family Coleophoridae. It is native to North Africa, the Middle East and Asia, including Pakistan, Egypt and Turkey. It is an introduced species in the United States in California, Nevada, Utah, Idaho, Arizona and Hawaii. It has been introduced intentionally as a biological control of invasive Salsola species.

Adults are creamy-white. There are up to three generations per year in warm areas and one or two generations in cooler areas.

The larvae feed on Salsola species, including Salsola australis. Full-grown larvae are about 17 mm (0.67 in) long and orange.
