= Coleophora cuprariella =

Scientific classification
- Kingdom: Animalia
- Phylum: Arthropoda
- Clade: Pancrustacea
- Class: Insecta
- Order: Lepidoptera
- Family: Coleophoridae
- Genus: Coleophora
- Species: C. cuprariella

Binomial name
- Coleophora cuprariella Lienig & Zeller, 1846

Synonyms
- Coleophora metallicella Fuchs, 1903 (homonym); Coleophora fuchsiella Oudejans, 1971 (replacement name)

Species of moth

Coleophora cuprariella is a moth of the family Coleophoridae. It is found on the Dodecanese Islands and Turkey.

The length of the forewings is 5–6 mm. Adults are on wing in April.
