= Coleophora nomgona =

Scientific classification
- Kingdom: Animalia
- Phylum: Arthropoda
- Class: Insecta
- Order: Lepidoptera
- Family: Coleophoridae
- Genus: Coleophora
- Species: C. nomgona

Binomial name
- Coleophora nomgona Falkovitsh, 1975

Species of moth

Coleophora nomgona is a moth of the family Coleophoridae. It is found in Hungary, Romania, Ukraine, southern Russia and Mongolia.
