= Coleophora eichleri =

Scientific classification
- Kingdom: Animalia
- Phylum: Arthropoda
- Class: Insecta
- Order: Lepidoptera
- Family: Coleophoridae
- Genus: Coleophora
- Species: C. eichleri

Binomial name
- Coleophora eichleri Patzak, 1977

Synonyms
- Ecebalia eichleri

Species of moth

Coleophora eichleri is a moth of the family Coleophoridae. It is found in southern Russia and central Asia. It occurs in desert-steppe and desert biotopes.

Adults are on wing from May to June.

The larvae feed on Caroxylon dendroides and Kochia prostrata. They feed on the generative organs of their host plant.
