= Coleophora testudo =

Scientific classification
- Kingdom: Animalia
- Phylum: Arthropoda
- Class: Insecta
- Order: Lepidoptera
- Family: Coleophoridae
- Genus: Coleophora
- Species: C. testudo

Binomial name
- Coleophora testudo Falkovitsh, 1973

Species of moth

Coleophora testudo is a moth of the family Coleophoridae. It is found in Turkestan and Uzbekistan.

The wingspan is 10.5-11.5 mm.

The larvae feed on Astragalus (including Astragalus unifoliolatus) and Ammodendron species. Larvae can be found at the end of May and (after diapause) from the end of March to April.
