= Coleophora protecta =

Scientific classification
- Kingdom: Animalia
- Phylum: Arthropoda
- Class: Insecta
- Order: Lepidoptera
- Family: Coleophoridae
- Genus: Coleophora
- Species: C. protecta

Binomial name
- Coleophora protecta Walsingham, 1907

Synonyms
- Coleophora pseudoserenella Toll, 1952; Coleophora fatmella Toll, 1956

Species of moth

Coleophora protecta is a moth of the family Coleophoridae described by Thomas de Grey, 6th Baron Walsingham, in 1907. It is found in Lebanon, Algeria, Morocco and Tunisia.

The larvae feed on Tragacantha armata and Tragacantha karakalensis. They feed on the leaves of their host plant.
