= Coleophora phlomidis =

Scientific classification
- Kingdom: Animalia
- Phylum: Arthropoda
- Clade: Pancrustacea
- Class: Insecta
- Order: Lepidoptera
- Family: Coleophoridae
- Genus: Coleophora
- Species: C. phlomidis

Binomial name
- Coleophora phlomidis Stainton, 1867

Synonyms
- Coleophora spiniferella Toll, 1952; Coleophora subochrea Toll, 1952

Species of moth

Coleophora phlomidis is a moth of the family Coleophoridae. It is found in Romania, southern Russia, central Asia and Asia Minor (Iran and Syria).

Adults are on wing from the middle of July to the middle of August.

The larvae feed on the leaves of Phlomis species (including Phlomis cancellata and Phlomis kopetdaghensis).
