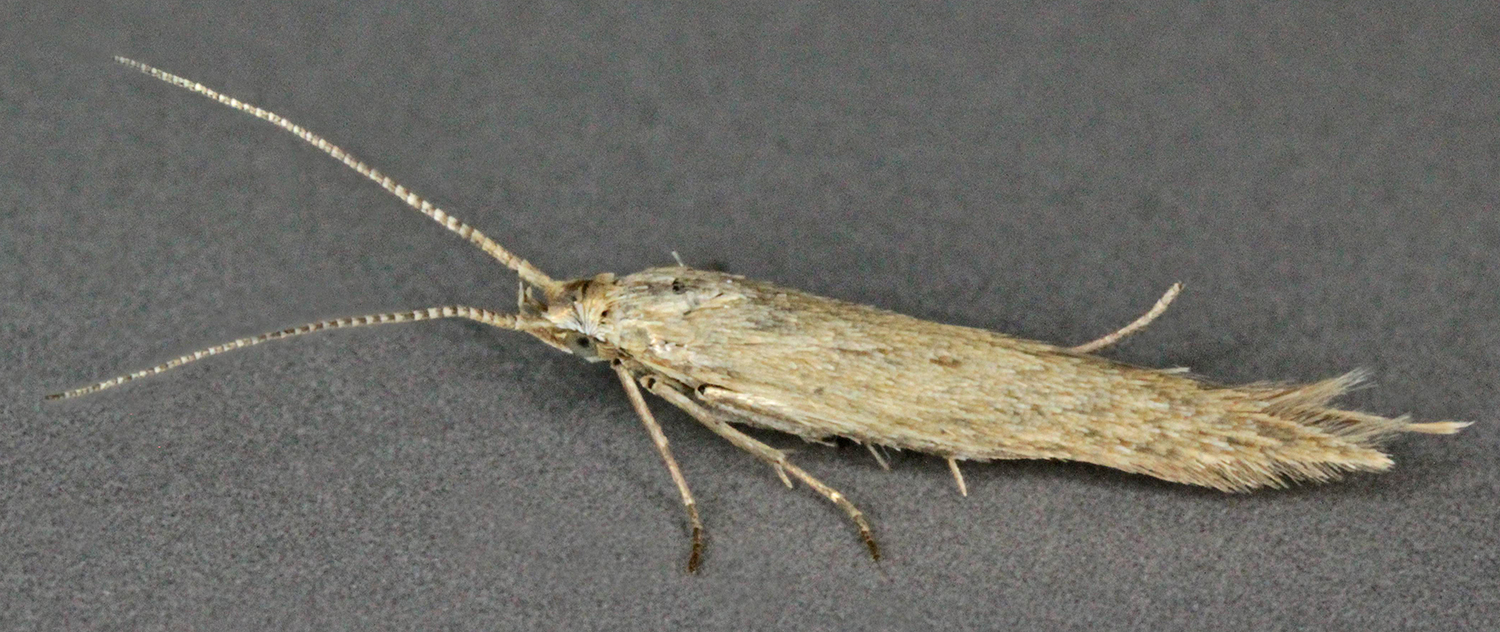
- Coleophora versurella, Deeside, North Wales

Scientific classification
- Kingdom: Animalia
- Phylum: Arthropoda
- Class: Insecta
- Order: Lepidoptera
- Family: Coleophoridae
- Genus: Coleophora
- Species: C. versurella

Binomial name
- Coleophora versurella Zeller, 1849

Synonyms
- List: Coleophora miserella Staudinger, 1880; Coleophora agricolella Fuchs, 1886; Coleophora atlanticolella Rebel, 1896; Coleophora tholoneura Meyrick, 1936; Coleophora pallorella Benander, 1939; Coleophora fayalensis Rebel, 1940; Coleophora thalassella McDunnough, 1940; Coleophora constanti Hering, 1942; Coleophora klimeschi Vlach, 1942; Coleophora saccharella Amsel, 1953; Coleophora pisella Amsel, 1953; Coleophora chiarelliae Pastrana, 1963; Coleophora amaranthivora Oku, 1965; Coleophora laripennella auct. nec. Zetterstedt, 1839; Ecebalia versurella; Coleophora enchorda Meyrick, 1931

= Coleophora versurella =

Species of moth

Coleophora versurella is a moth of the family Coleophoridae. It was described by Philipp Christoph Zeller in 1849.

== Description ==
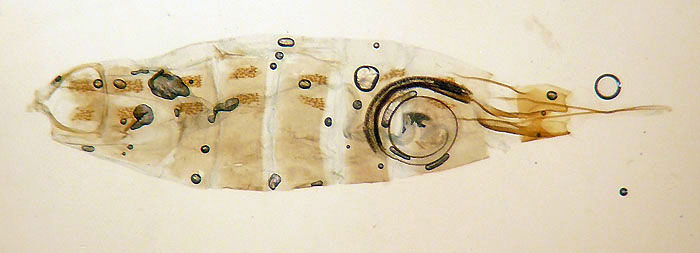
Genitalia of Coleophora versurella

The wingspan is 11–15 mm.The forewings are yellow. Several other species of Coleophora look similar and are only to be identified by reference to the genitalia.

Adults are on wing from June to September. The larvae feed on orache (Atriplex species) and goosefoot (Chenopodium species). Other recorded food plants include sea purslane (Halimione portulacoides) and Amaranthus.

== Distribution ==
It is found everywhere in Europe except for Iceland and Luxembourg. It has also been recorded from Argentina, India, the United Arab Emirates and Oman.
