= Coleophora tauricella =

Scientific classification
- Kingdom: Animalia
- Phylum: Arthropoda
- Class: Insecta
- Order: Lepidoptera
- Family: Coleophoridae
- Genus: Coleophora
- Species: C. tauricella

Binomial name
- Coleophora tauricella Staudinger, 1880

Synonyms
- Coleophora egenella Toll, 1952; Coleophora kurdistanella Amsel, 1955; Coleophora skopusella Amsel, 1935

Species of moth

Coleophora tauricella is a moth of the family Coleophoridae. It is found in Croatia and Greece.

The larvae feed on Echium species.
