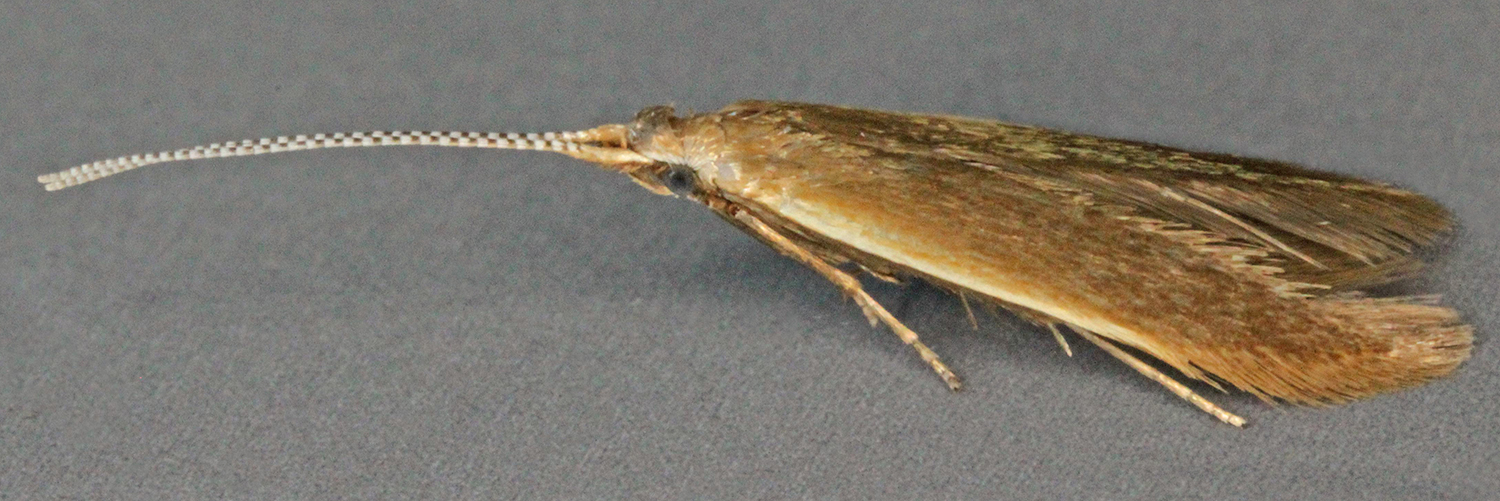

Scientific classification
- Kingdom: Animalia
- Phylum: Arthropoda
- Class: Insecta
- Order: Lepidoptera
- Family: Coleophoridae
- Genus: Coleophora
- Species: C. limosipennella

Binomial name
- Coleophora limosipennella (Duponchel, 1843)

Synonyms
- Ornix limosipennella Duponchel, 1843

= Coleophora limosipennella =

Species of moth

Coleophora limosipennella is a moth of the family Coleophoridae described by Philogène Auguste Joseph Duponchel in 1843. It is found in Europe from Fennoscandia to the Pyrenees, Italy and the Balkan Peninsula and from Great Britain to the Baltic States and Romania. It is an introduced species in North America.

The moth flies from June to July depending on the location. Its wingspan is 10–13 mm (0.39–0.51 in).

Coleophora limosipennella larvae feed on Ulmus, and supposedly also on Alnus and Betula. Full-grown larvae can be found in June and July.

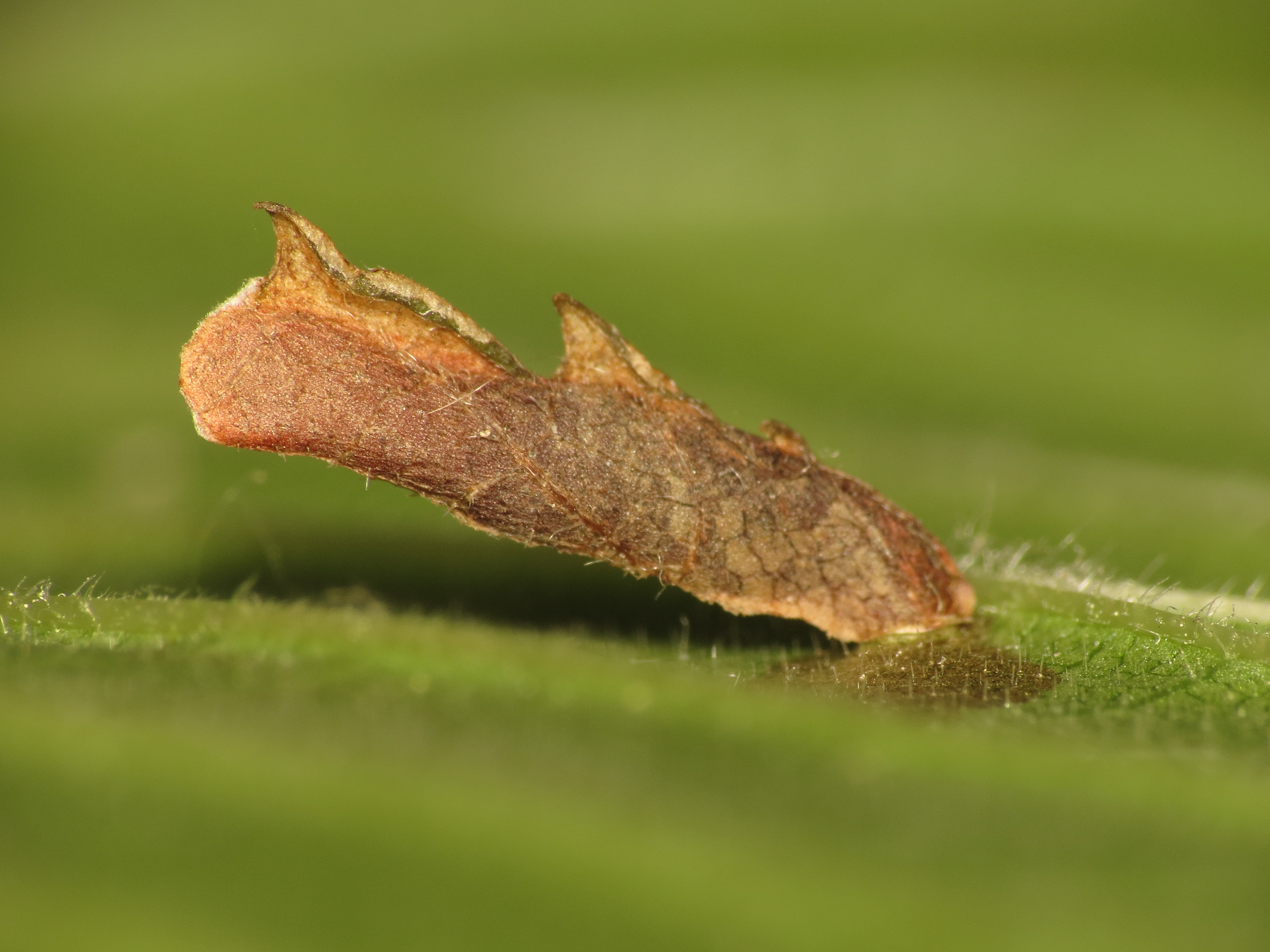
Larval case
