= Giorgio Baldizzone =

Italian entomologist

Giorgio Baldizzone (born 27 May 1946 in Asti, Piedmont, Italy) is an Italian entomologist who specialises in the study of Microlepidoptera, in particular the family Coleophoridae. Baldizzone is a past president of the Piedmonte and Valle d'Aosta chapter of the World Wide Fund for Nature.
