= Trichoclea =

Scientific classification
- Kingdom: Animalia
- Phylum: Arthropoda
- Class: Insecta
- Order: Lepidoptera
- Superfamily: Noctuoidea
- Family: Noctuidae
- Genus: Trichoclea; Grote, 1883

Genus of moths

Trichoclea was a genus of moths of the family Noctuidae. It is now considered a synonym of Anarta.

== Former species ==
- Trichoclea antica Smith, 1891
- Trichoclea decepta Grote, 1883
- Trichoclea edwardsii Smith, 1888
- Trichoclea florida (Smith, 1900)
- Trichoclea postica Smith, 1891

== Placed in Sideridis ==
- Trichoclea artesta is now Sideridis artesta (Smith, 1903)
- Trichoclea fuscolutea is now Sideridis fuscolutea (Smith, 1892)
- Trichoclea mojave is now Sideridis mojave Benjamin, 1932
- Trichoclea ruisa is now Sideridis ruisa Forbes, 1913
- Trichoclea uscripta is now Sideridis uscripta (Smith, 1891)
- Trichoclea vindemialis is now Sideridis vindemialis (Guenée, 1852)
