= Megasis =

Scientific classification
- Kingdom: Animalia
- Phylum: Arthropoda
- Class: Insecta
- Order: Lepidoptera
- Family: Pyralidae
- Tribe: Phycitini
- Genus: Megasis; Guenée, 1845

Synonyms
- Sarata Ragonot, 1887

Genus of moths

Megasis is a genus of snout moths described by Achille Guenée in 1845.

== Species ==
List after Leraut, 2021

- Megasis alpha (Heinrich, 1956)
- Megasis alpherakii Ragonot, 1887
- Megasis atrella (Hulst, 1890)
- Megasis beta (Heinrich, 1956)
- Megasis caudellella (Dyar, 1904)
- Megasis cinereella (Hulst, 1900)
- Megasis delta (Heinrich, 1956)
- Megasis dophnerella (Ragonot, 1887)
- Megasis edwardsialis (Hulst, 1886)
- Megasis epsilon (Heinrich, 1956)
- Megasis gamma (Heinrich, 1956)
- Megasis hyrcanella Ragonot, 1893
- Megasis iota (Heinrich, 1956)
- Megasis kappa (Heinrich, 1956)
- Megasis kocaki Akin, 2016
- Megasis lesurella D. Lucas, 1932
- Megasis nigrifasciella (Ragonot, 1887)
- Megasis perfuscalis (Hulst, 1886)
- Megasis phi (Heinrich, 1956)
- Megasis pullatella Ragonot, 1887
- Megasis punctella Dyar, 1914
- Megasis ragonoti P. Leraut, 2003
- Megasis rippertella (Zeller, 1839)
- Megasis rubrithoracella (Barnes & McDunnough, 1913)
- Megasis signatella (Pagenstecher, 1907)
- Megasis tephrella Ragonot, 1893

Else: For Megasis noctileucella Ragonot, 1887, see as synonym under Lambaesia fumosella (Ragonot, 1887).
For Megasis philippella (Viette, 1970), see Tsaraphycis philippella Viette, 1970
For Megasis pupillatella Ragonot, 1887, see Arsissa pupillatella (Ragonot, 1887)
For Megasis satanella Ragonot, 1887, see as synonym under Isauria dilucidella (Duponchel, 1836)
