= Satanella =

Satanella may refer to:

== Books ==
- Satanella, one of the pen names of Austrian writer Ada Christen (1839-1901)
- Across Europe with Satanella, book by motorbike traveller Clare Sheridan

== Film and theatre ==
- Satanella Amarante company, Portugal, founded by Luisa Satanela, in which António Silva (actor) and others performed
- Herzogin Satanella, 1921 Austrian film directed by Michael Curtiz
- Satanella, lead role played by María Martín in La mano della morta; see Hand of Death (1949 film)

== Music and dance ==
- Satanella (ballet), 1848 revision by Marius Petipa of Le Diable amoureux (ballet) 1840
  - "Satanella pas de deux", added to ballet 1859 Cesare Pugni
- Satanella (Balfe), 1858 opera
- Satanella, opera by Emil von Reznicek
- Satanela also Satanella, 1898 Czech opera by Josef Richard Rozkošný
- Satanella, 1863 comic opera by Augustus Glossop Harris
- "Satanella-Polka", Op.124 Johann Strauss, II
- "Satanella-Quadrille", Op.123 Johann Strauss, II

== Transport ==
- Satanella (ship), Welsh pleasure steamer in accident with SS Fenella (1881)
- Satanella, nickname of an AJS motorcycle, the first British motorcycle in the Soviet Union Clare Sheridan

== Science ==
- Sideridis satanella a species of moth; see Sideridis
- Megasis satanella, a species of snout moth in the genus Megasis
