= Megasis ragonoti =

Scientific classification
- Kingdom: Animalia
- Phylum: Arthropoda
- Class: Insecta
- Order: Lepidoptera
- Family: Pyralidae
- Genus: Megasis
- Species: M. ragonoti

Binomial name
- Megasis ragonoti Leraut, 2003

Species of moth

Megasis ragonoti is a species of snout moth in the genus Megasis. It was described by Patrice J.A. Leraut in 2003 and is known from Altai, Russia.
