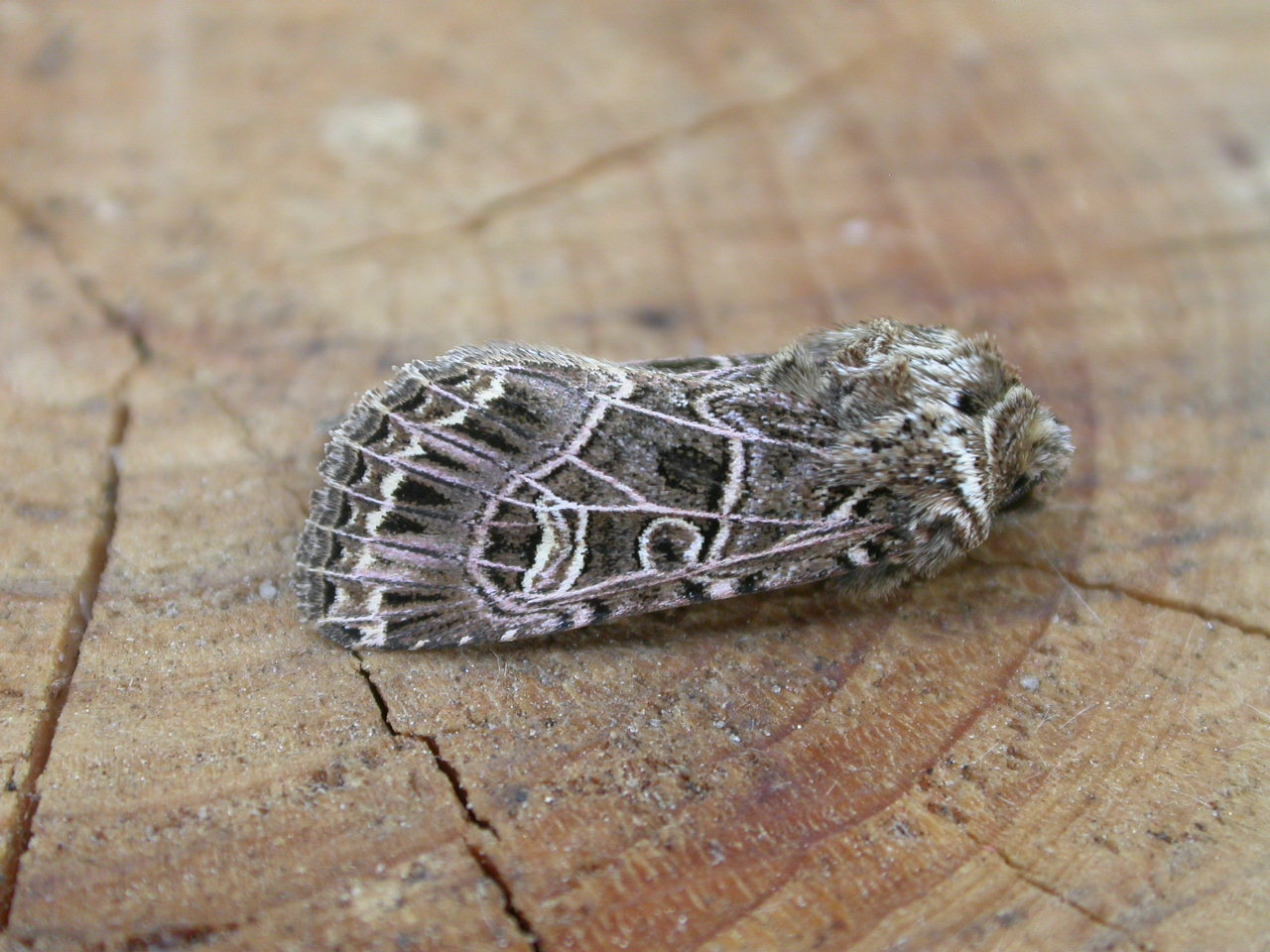

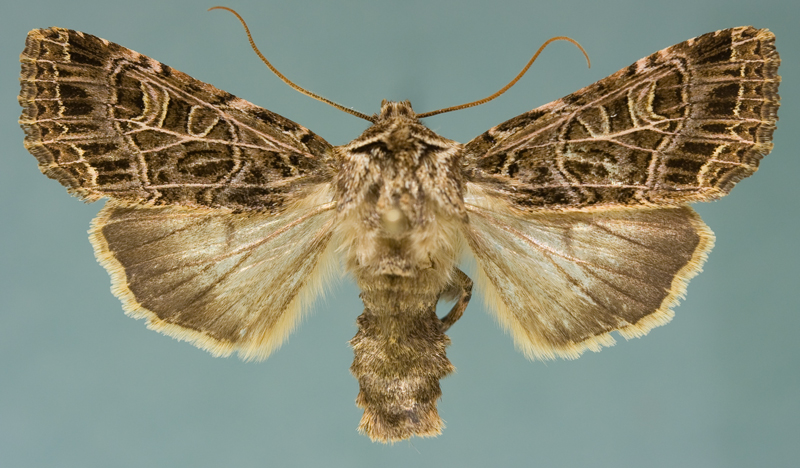

Scientific classification
- Domain: Eukaryota
- Kingdom: Animalia
- Phylum: Arthropoda
- Class: Insecta
- Order: Lepidoptera
- Superfamily: Noctuoidea
- Family: Noctuidae
- Genus: Sideridis
- Species: S. reticulata

Binomial name
- Sideridis reticulata (Goeze, 1781)

Synonyms
- Heliophobus reticulata; Sideridis reticulatus

= Sideridis reticulata =

Species of moth

Sideridis reticulata, commonly known as the bordered Gothic, is a moth of the family Noctuidae. It is found in the Palearctic realm, from the Iberian Peninsula throughout Europe and the temperate regions of Central Asia and the Russian Far East. In the north it occurs in Fennoscandia south of the Arctic Circle. In the south it ranges to the Mediterranean. It rises to over 2000 metres above sea level in the Alps.

== Technical description and variation ==
The wingspan is 32–37 mm. Forewing dark fuscous, with a purplish sheen when fresh; all the veins white, between outer and submarginal lines black with pale outlines; claviform stigma black and broad; upper stigmata concisely outlined with pale, the reniform with a central pale line; a slight pale apical streak; submarginal line white; hindwing fuscous, the basal half, especially in male, considerably paler; — unicolor Alph. is said to have no violet tinge; but this is always the case when the insect has been out for any length of time.

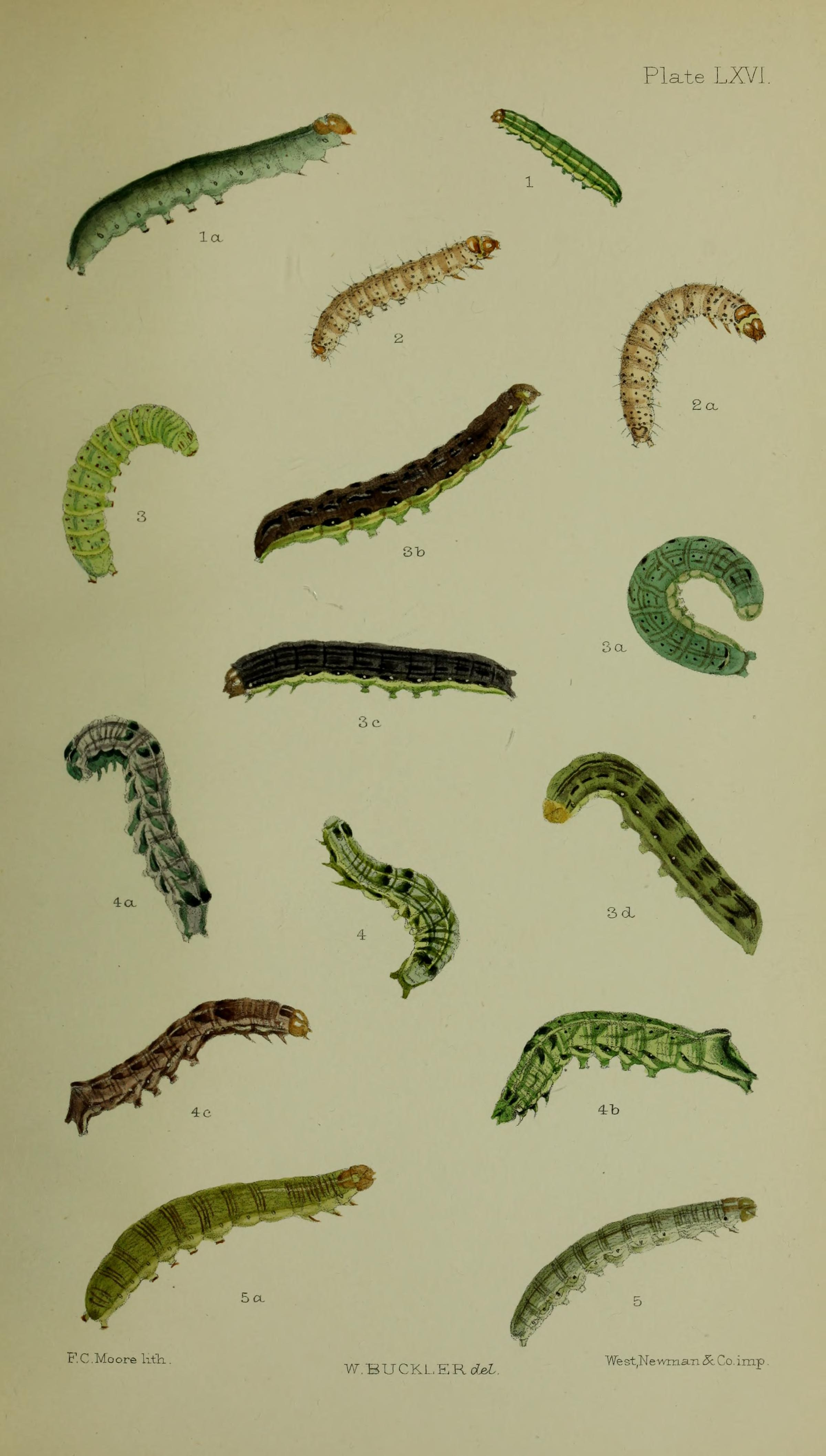
Figs 5, 5a larva after last moult

== Biology ==
The moth flies from May to August depending on the location.

Larva greenish or pinkish ochreous, irrorated (speckled) with darker; dorsal line faint; lateral lines black and well-marked; head brown. The larvae feed on Saponaria officinalis, Silene vulgaris and Polygonum aviculare.

The species has disappeared from the United Kingdom as a resident species during the first decade of the 21st century.

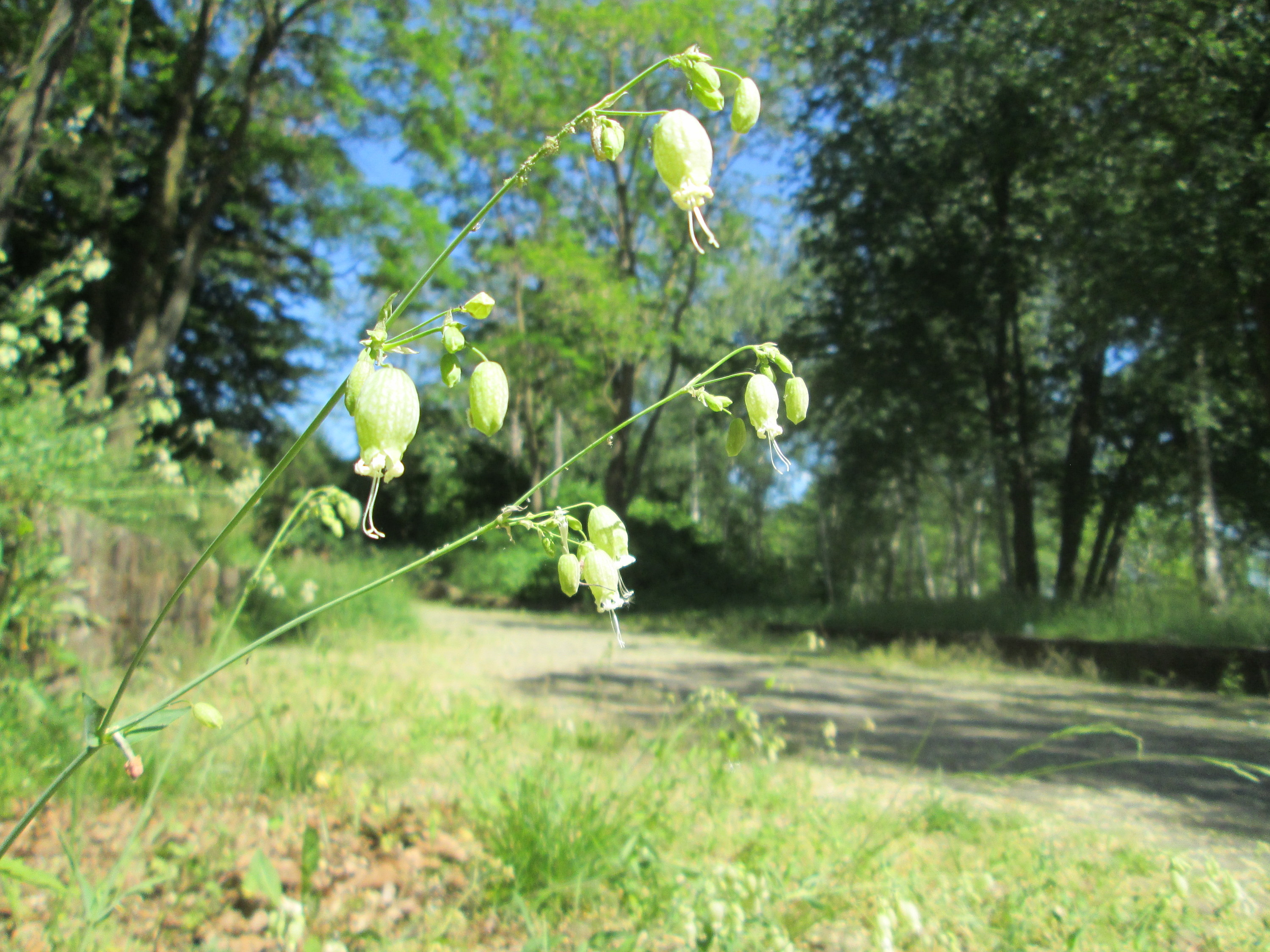
Habitat
