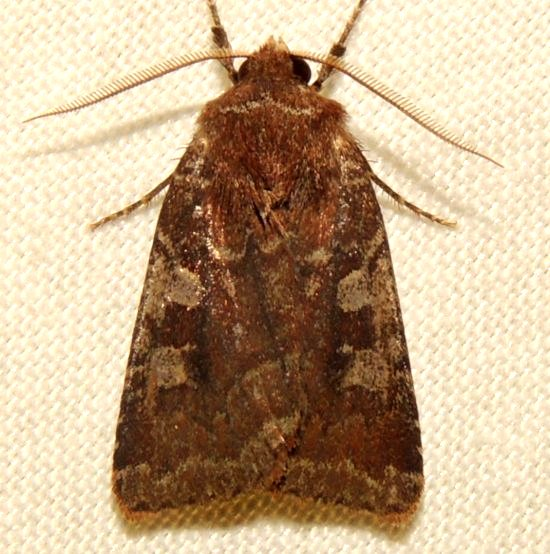

Scientific classification
- Domain: Eukaryota
- Kingdom: Animalia
- Phylum: Arthropoda
- Class: Insecta
- Order: Lepidoptera
- Superfamily: Noctuoidea
- Family: Noctuidae
- Genus: Sideridis
- Species: S. congermana

Binomial name
- Sideridis congermana (Morrison, 1874)

= Sideridis congermana =

Species of moth

Sideridis congermana, or the German cousin, is a species of cutworm or dart moth in the family Noctuidae. It is found in North America.

The MONA or Hodges number for Sideridis congermana is 10266.
