= Arsissa ramosella =

Scientific classification
- Domain: Eukaryota
- Kingdom: Animalia
- Phylum: Arthropoda
- Class: Insecta
- Order: Lepidoptera
- Family: Pyralidae
- Genus: Arsissa
- Species: A. ramosella

Binomial name
- Arsissa ramosella (Herrich-Schäffer, 1852)

Synonyms
- Myelois ramosella Herrich-Schäffer, 1852

Species of moth

Arsissa ramosella is a species of snout moth in the genus Arsissa. It was described by Gottlieb August Wilhelm Herrich-Schäffer in 1852. It is found in Turkey and Transcaucasia.
