= Megasis hyrcanella =

Scientific classification
- Kingdom: Animalia
- Phylum: Arthropoda
- Class: Insecta
- Order: Lepidoptera
- Family: Pyralidae
- Genus: Megasis
- Species: M. hyrcanella

Binomial name
- Megasis hyrcanella Ragonot, 1893

Species of moth

Megasis hyrcanella is a species of snout moth in the genus Megasis. It was described by Ragonot in 1893, and is known from Iran. The species epithet is derived from Hyrcania, a satrapy which previously existed within present-day Iran.
