= Tsaraphycis safedella =

Scientific classification
- Domain: Eukaryota
- Kingdom: Animalia
- Phylum: Arthropoda
- Class: Insecta
- Order: Lepidoptera
- Family: Pyralidae
- Genus: Tsaraphycis
- Species: T. safedella

Binomial name
- Tsaraphycis safedella (Amsel, 1970)

Synonyms
- Megasis safedella Amsel, 1970

Species of moth

Tsaraphycis safedella is a species of snout moth in the genus Tsaraphycis. It was described by Hans Georg Amsel in 1970 and is found in Afghanistan.
