= Arsissa atlantica =

Scientific classification
- Domain: Eukaryota
- Kingdom: Animalia
- Phylum: Arthropoda
- Class: Insecta
- Order: Lepidoptera
- Family: Pyralidae
- Genus: Arsissa
- Species: A. atlantica

Binomial name
- Arsissa atlantica Asselbergs, 2009

Species of moth

Arsissa atlantica is a species of snout moth in the genus Arsissa. It was described by Jan Asselbergs in 2009 and is known from the Canary Islands.
