= Arsissa =

Scientific classification
- Kingdom: Animalia
- Phylum: Arthropoda
- Class: Insecta
- Order: Lepidoptera
- Family: Pyralidae
- Tribe: Phycitini
- Genus: Arsissa; Ragonot, 1893

Genus of moths

Arsissa is a genus of snout moths. It was described by Ragonot, in 1893, and is known from Spain and Namibia.

== Species ==
- Arsissa afghana (Hartig, 1937)
- Arsissa aksuella (Caradja, 1916)
- Arsissa albistriga (Erschoff, 1874)
- Arsissa divaricella (Ragonot, 1887)
- Arsissa firusella (Amsel, 1961)
- Arsissa haberhaueri (Ragonot, 1893)
- Arsissa pupillatella (Ragonot, 1887)
- Arsissa ramosella (Herrich-Schäffer, 1852)
- Arsissa transvaalica Balinsky, 1991
- Arsissa atlantica Asselbergs, 2009
