= Megasis satanella =

Scientific classification
- Kingdom: Animalia
- Phylum: Arthropoda
- Class: Insecta
- Order: Lepidoptera
- Family: Pyralidae
- Genus: Megasis
- Species: M. satanella

Binomial name
- Megasis satanella Ragonot, 1887

Species of moth

Megasis satanella was a species of snout moth in the genus Megasis. It was described by Émile Louis Ragonot in 1887, and is known from Armenia. It was later considered to be a junior synonym of Isauria dilucidella (Duponchel, 1836) by Roesler 1993.
