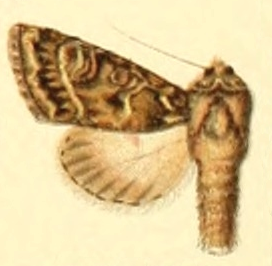

Scientific classification
- Kingdom: Animalia
- Phylum: Arthropoda
- Clade: Pancrustacea
- Class: Insecta
- Order: Lepidoptera
- Superfamily: Noctuoidea
- Family: Noctuidae
- Genus: Sideridis
- Species: S. peculiaris

Binomial name
- Sideridis peculiaris (Staudinger, 1888)

Synonyms
- Mamestra peculiaris Staudinger, 1888; Scotogramma peculiaris (Staudinger, 1888)

= Sideridis peculiaris =

Species of moth

Sideridis peculiaris is a moth of the family Noctuidae. It is found in temperate zones of Russia and Central Asia.
