= Isauria (moth) =

Scientific classification
- Kingdom: Animalia
- Phylum: Arthropoda
- Class: Insecta
- Order: Lepidoptera
- Family: Pyralidae
- Subfamily: Phycitinae
- Genus: Isauria; Ragonot, 1887

Synonyms
- Adelosemia Ragonot, 1887; Divona Ragonot, 1893; Melitene Ragonot, 1888; Pseudomegasis Chrétien, 1931

Genus of moths

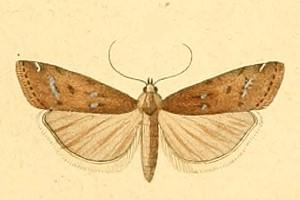

Isauria is a genus of snout moths described by Émile Louis Ragonot in 1887.

== Species ==
- Isauria dilucidella (Duponchel, 1836)
- Isauria gabalitella (Chrétien, 1931)
- Isauria kuldgensis Ragonot, 1887
- Isauria rubricantella ((Joannis, 1913)

Since elsewhere

- Isauria crepusculella (Lederer, 1870)
- Isauria subsoritella (Ragonot, 1887)
- Isauria ubricantella (de Joannis, 1913)
