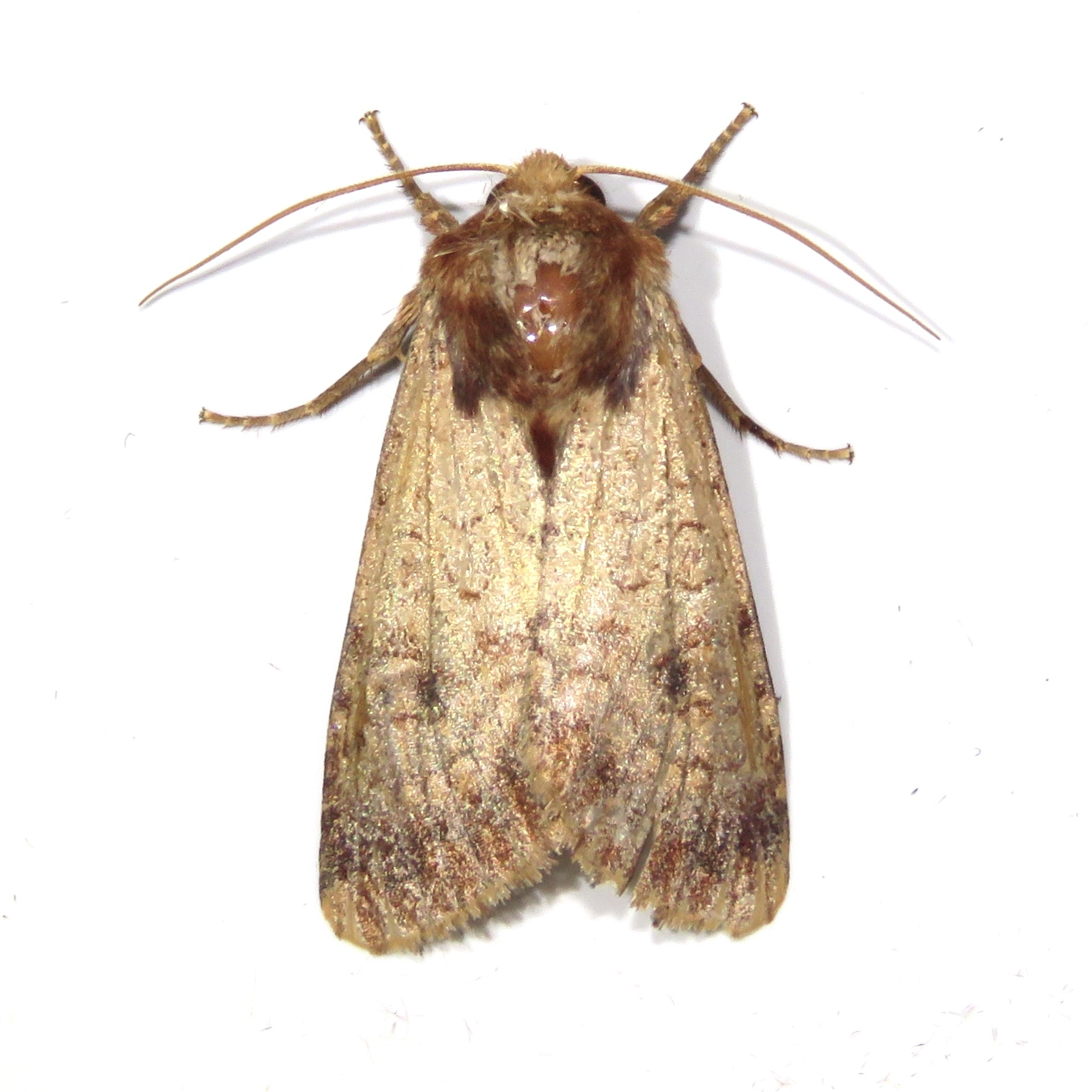

Scientific classification
- Domain: Eukaryota
- Kingdom: Animalia
- Phylum: Arthropoda
- Class: Insecta
- Order: Lepidoptera
- Superfamily: Noctuoidea
- Family: Noctuidae
- Tribe: Hadenini
- Genus: Sideridis
- Species: S. rosea

Binomial name
- Sideridis rosea (Harvey, 1874)

= Sideridis rosea =

Species of moth

Sideridis rosea, the rosewing, is a species of cutworm or dart moth in the family Noctuidae. It is found in North America.
