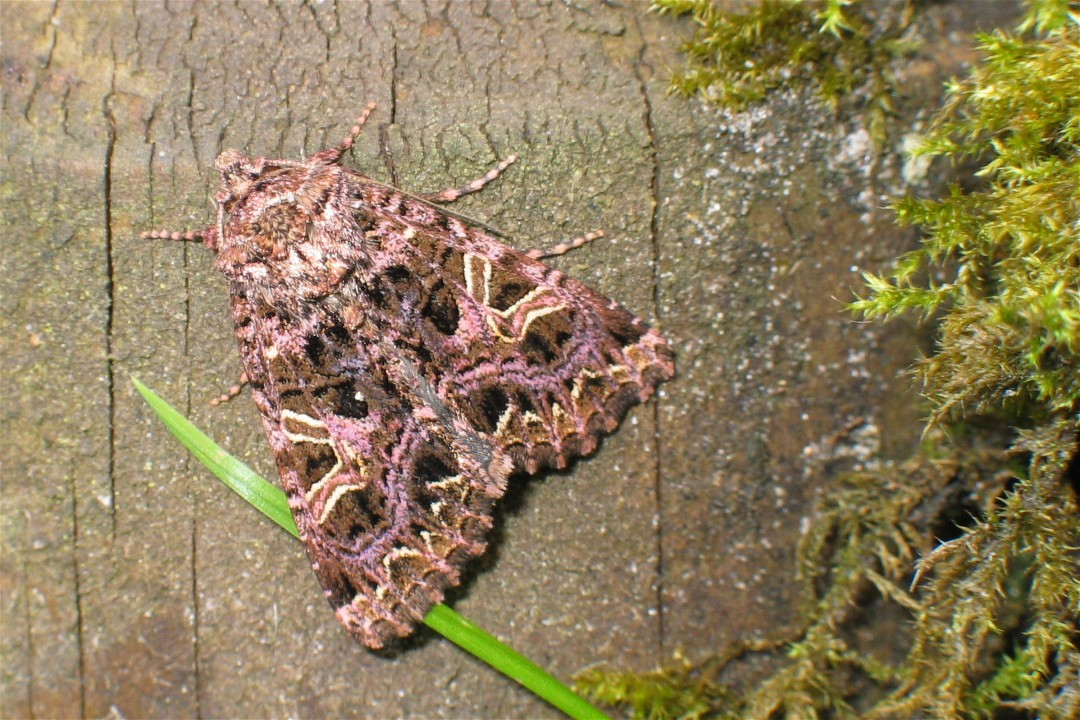

Scientific classification
- Domain: Eukaryota
- Kingdom: Animalia
- Phylum: Arthropoda
- Class: Insecta
- Order: Lepidoptera
- Superfamily: Noctuoidea
- Family: Noctuidae
- Genus: Sideridis
- Species: S. rivularis

Binomial name
- Sideridis rivularis (Fabricius, 1775)

Synonyms
- Hadena rivularis; Dianthoecia cucubali

= Sideridis rivularis =

Species of moth

Sideridis rivularis, the campion, is a species of moth of the family Noctuidae. It is found in from the northern part of the Iberian Peninsula, through the whole of Europe. To the east, it is found in Central Asia and Siberia, up to Manchuria. To the south, it is found in the Mediterranean Sea region (with the exception of Greece) and parts of Asia Minor. In the Alps, it is found at up to 1,600 metres above sea level.

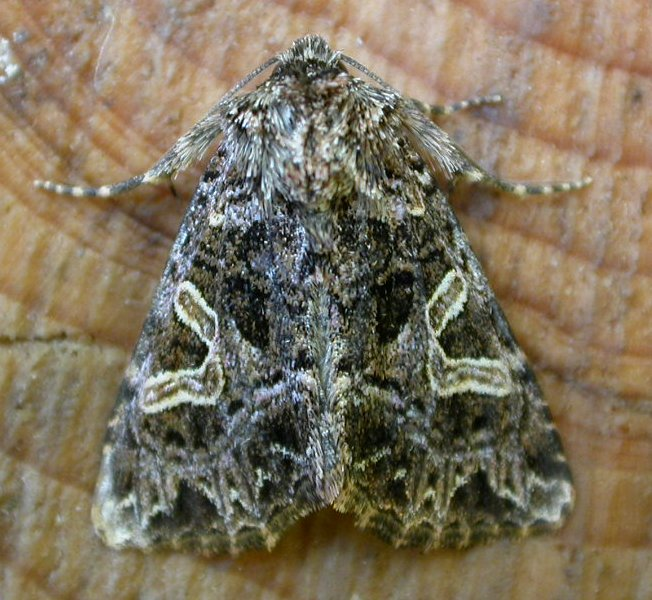
Sideridis rivularis

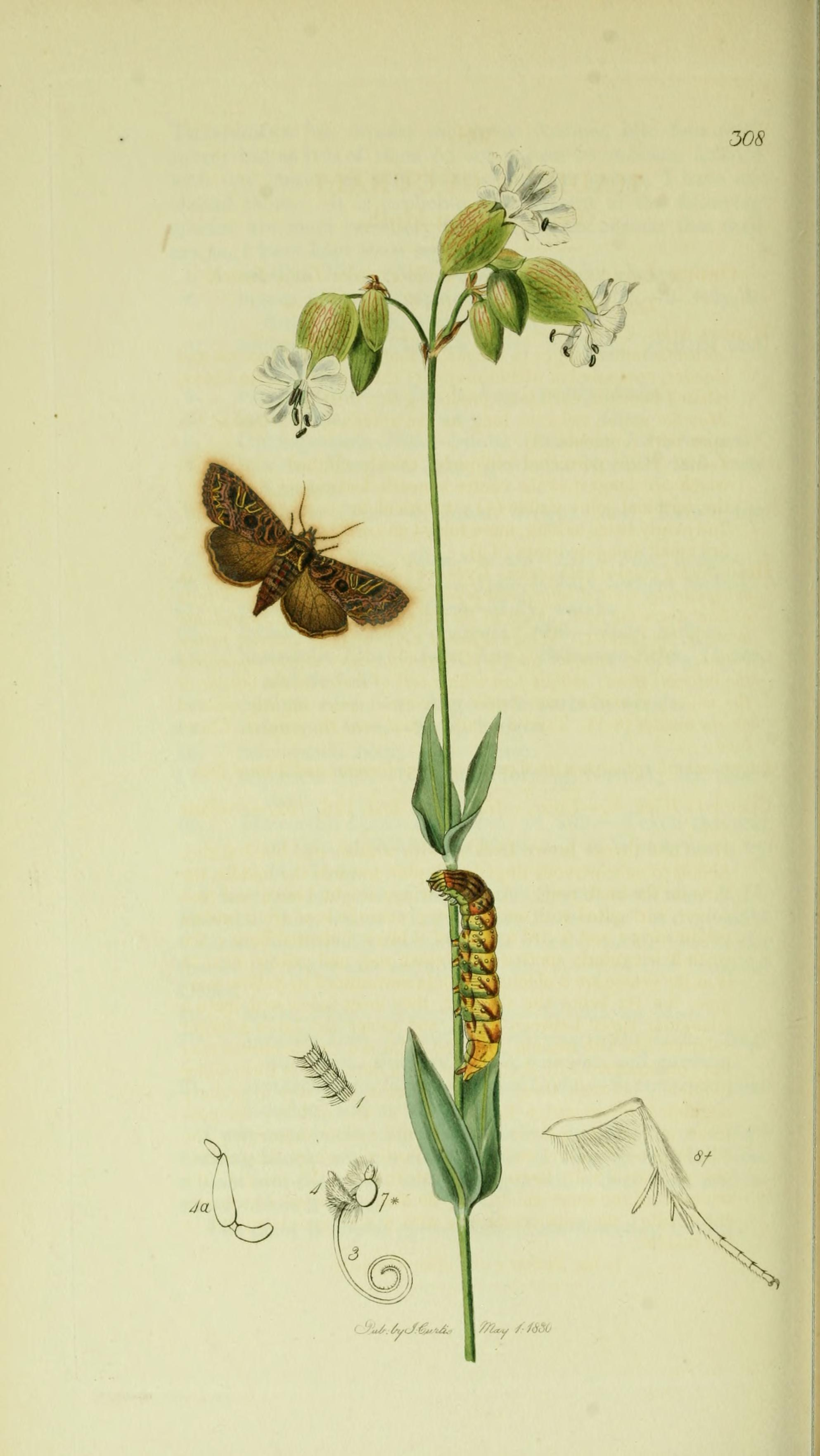
Illustration from John Curtis's British Entomology Volume 5

== Technical description and variation ==
The wingspan is 27–30 mm. The length of the forewings is 14–16 mm. Forewing brownish fuscous with a violet sheen; the lines double; claviform stigma large, black; orbicular and reniform grey with yellowish or whitish outlines, conversely oblique and contiguous on median vein; veins dark outlined with grey; submarginal line yellowish or white, dentate; hindwing brownish fuscous, darker in female: the ab. behenis Frr. has the outer half of costa of forewing pale; — S. mandarina Leech (now considered to be a species) from Japan and China, is rather larger and darker, the markings in consequence somewhat less distinct.

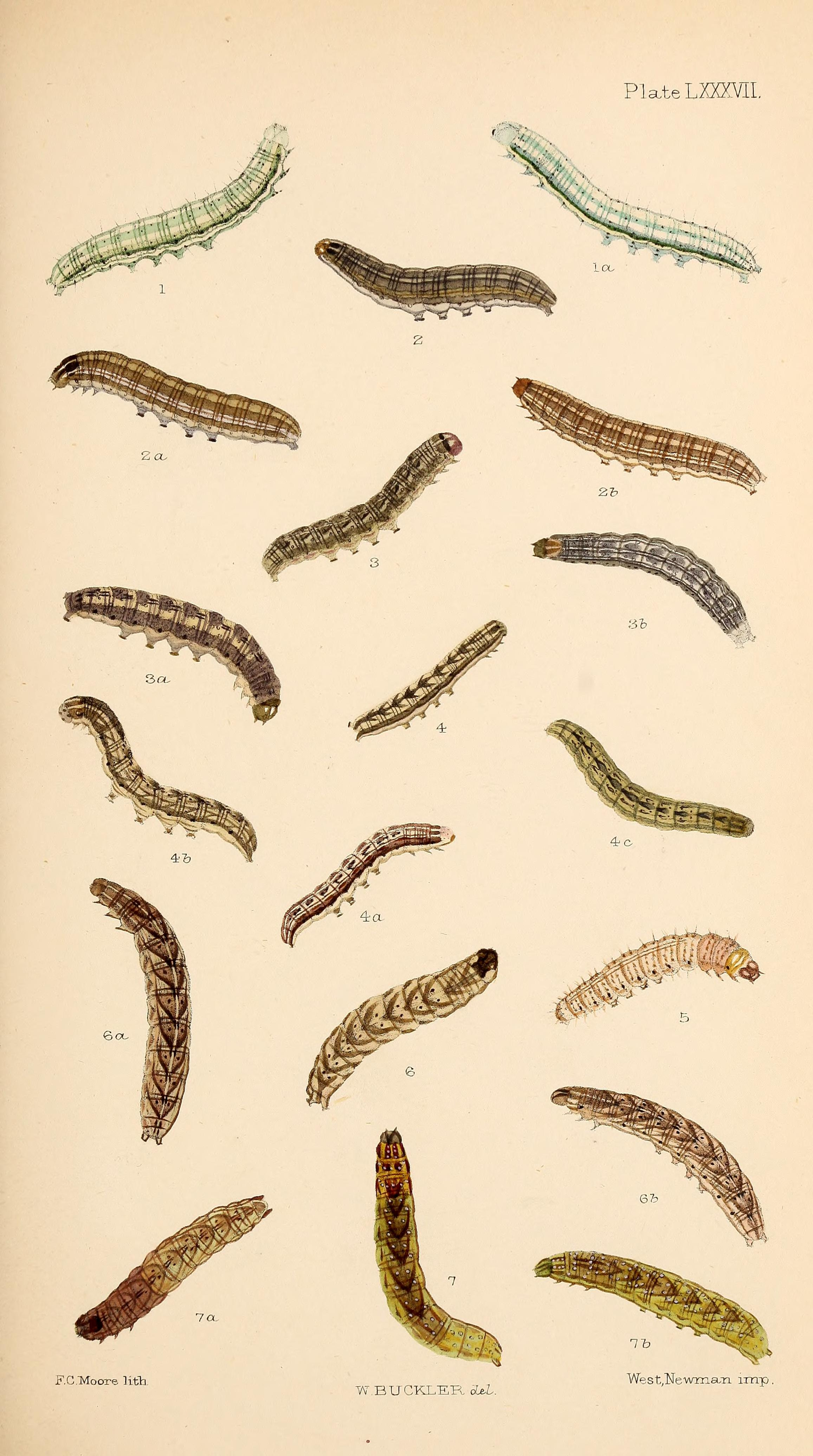
Figs.7,7a,7b larvae after final moult

== Biology ==
The moth flies from April to September depending on the location. There are two generations per year.

Larva greenish grey or yellowish, dotted with white: dorsal line dark with a row of oblique reddish grey stripes on each side. They feed on various low-growing plants, such as Silene species (primarily red campion (Silene dioica), Lychnis spp. and Cucubalus baccifer. At first, they feed on the flowers and seed-capsules, eating the seeds, later they also feed on the leaves.
