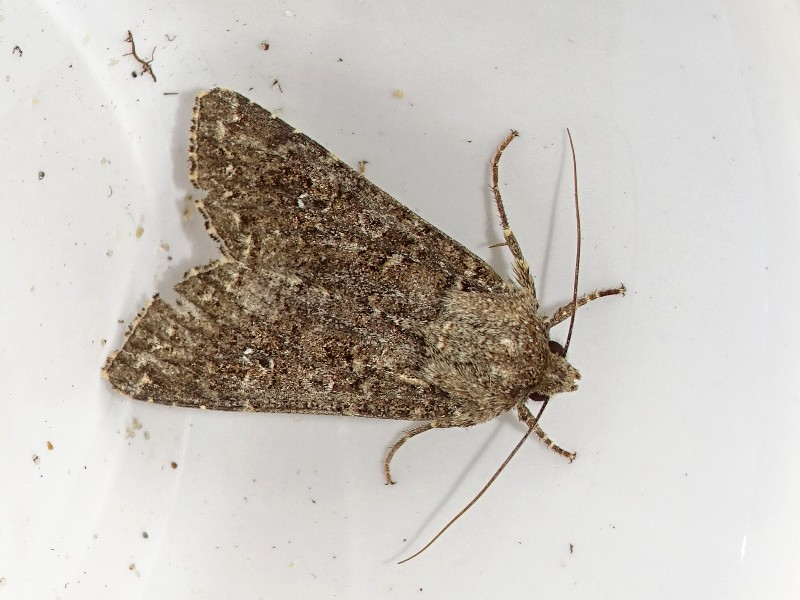

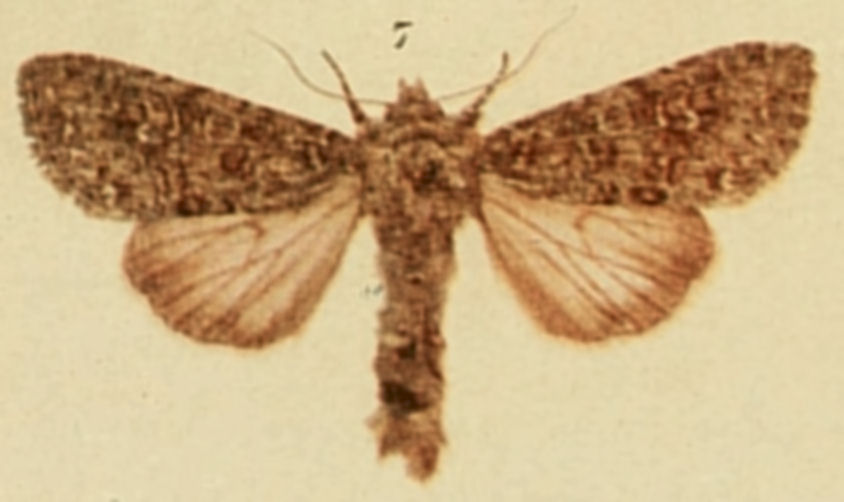

Scientific classification
- Domain: Eukaryota
- Kingdom: Animalia
- Phylum: Arthropoda
- Class: Insecta
- Order: Lepidoptera
- Superfamily: Noctuoidea
- Family: Noctuidae
- Genus: Sideridis
- Species: S. turbida

Binomial name
- Sideridis turbida (Esper, 1790)

Synonyms
- Phalaena (Noctua) turbida Esper, 1790; Phalaena (Noctua) turbida Esper, [1803]; Noctua albicolon Hübner, [1813]; Trichoclea boursini Agenjo, 1941; Sideridis albicolon (Hübner, 1813)

= Sideridis turbida =

White colon

Species of moth

Sideridis turbida, the white colon, is a moth of the family Noctuidae, subfamily Hadeninae. It is found throughout continental Europe, the British Isles and southern Scandinavia.

== Technical description and variation ==
The wingspan is 36–44 mm. Forewing drab grey, suffused brown, except along costa and inner margin, and in an oblique pale fascia-form submarginal area;the pale submarginal fascia externally throw's off pale teeth; a long black streak from base below cell: median vein white, with only a small white spot at end of cell and a minute black point above it: veins whitish with black terminal streaks in the intervals:hindwing dark greyish, fuscous. - ab. suffusa Tutt is a melanic brown form common in Britain, occurring, but rarely, in the Alps; — ochracea Tutt is a brownish ochreous form, also rare, apparently, on the continent.

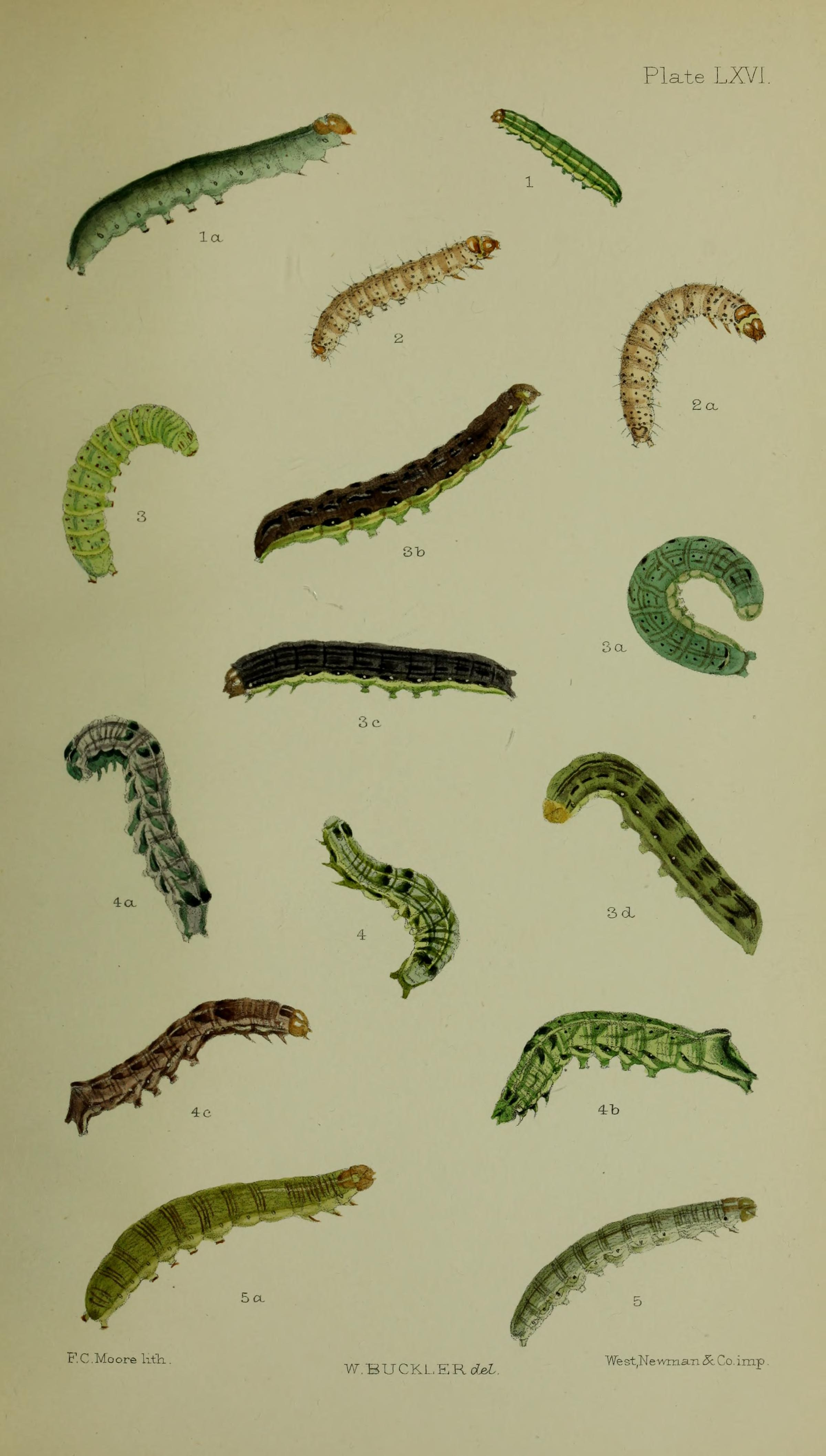
Figs 1 larva about halfgrown 1a larva after last moult

== Biology ==
The moth flies from May to July, with a second brood in August–September in southern parts of its range.

Larva reddish brown, with scattered black clots: dorsal and subdorsal lines black and fine; venter paler;thoracic plate black with 3 white lines; head brown. The larvae feed on various plants growing in sandy places, including dandelion and plantain.

The English vernacular name refers to the only distinctive marking on the moth, a pair of white dots outward of the center of the forewing resembling a colon or joined into a > shape.
