= Tsaraphycis =

Scientific classification
- Kingdom: Animalia
- Phylum: Arthropoda
- Class: Insecta
- Order: Lepidoptera
- Family: Pyralidae
- Subfamily: Phycitinae
- Genus: Tsaraphycis; Viette, 1970

Synonyms
- Gigasis Leraut, 2003

Genus of moths

Tsaraphycis is a genus of snout moths. It was described by Viette in 1970.

== Species ==
- Tsaraphycis libanoticella (Zerny, 1934)
- Tsaraphycis mimeticella (Staudinger, 1879)
- Tsaraphycis oreadella G. Leraut, 2019
- Tsaraphycis philippella Viette, 1970
- Tsaraphycis safedella (Amsel, 1970)
- Tsaraphycis viettei G. Leraut, 2019
