= Megasis lesurella =

Scientific classification
- Kingdom: Animalia
- Phylum: Arthropoda
- Class: Insecta
- Order: Lepidoptera
- Family: Pyralidae
- Genus: Megasis
- Species: M. lesurella

Binomial name
- Megasis lesurella D. Lucas, 1932

Synonyms
- Megasis bourgogneella D. Lucas, 1942

Species of moth

Megasis lesurella is a species of snout moth in the genus Megasis. It was described by Daniel Lucas in 1932 and is known from Morocco (including Aïn Leuh and Ifrane).
