= Tsaraphycis libanoticella =

Scientific classification
- Kingdom: Animalia
- Phylum: Arthropoda
- Class: Insecta
- Order: Lepidoptera
- Family: Pyralidae
- Genus: Tsaraphycis
- Species: T. libanoticella

Binomial name
- Tsaraphycis libanoticella (Zerny, 1934)

Synonyms
- Megasis libanoticella Zerny, 1934

Species of moth

Tsaraphycis libanoticella is a species of snout moth in the genus Tsaraphycis. It was described by Zerny in 1934. It is found in Lebanon and Turkey.
