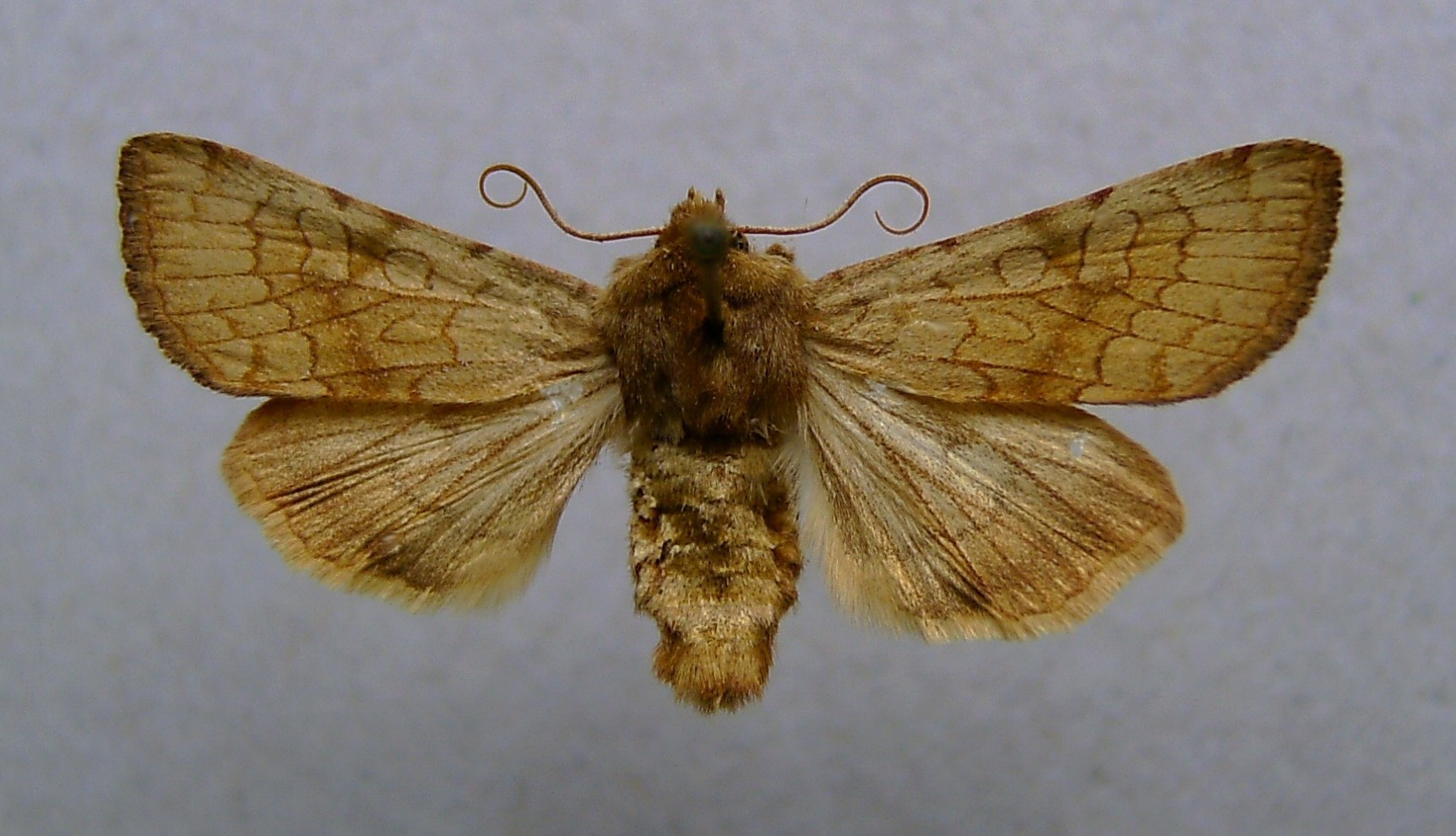

Scientific classification
- Domain: Eukaryota
- Kingdom: Animalia
- Phylum: Arthropoda
- Class: Insecta
- Order: Lepidoptera
- Superfamily: Noctuoidea
- Family: Noctuidae
- Genus: Sideridis
- Species: S. lampra

Binomial name
- Sideridis lampra (Schawerda, 1913)

Synonyms
- Sideridis evidens; Leucania evidens var. lampra Schawerda, 1913; Noctua evidens Hübner, [1808]; Sideridis anapheles Nye, 1975

= Sideridis lampra =

Species of moth

Sideridis lampra is a species of moth of the family Noctuidae. It is found from southern and central Europe, east to the Ural and Altai and in the south to eastern Turkey.

The wingspan is 28–35 mm. Adults are on wing mid April to the beginning of July and from mid August to the end of September. There are two generations per year.

The larvae feed on Berberis species, they prefer the flowers. Adults feed on the flower nectar of Berberis vulgaris and Echium vulgare.
