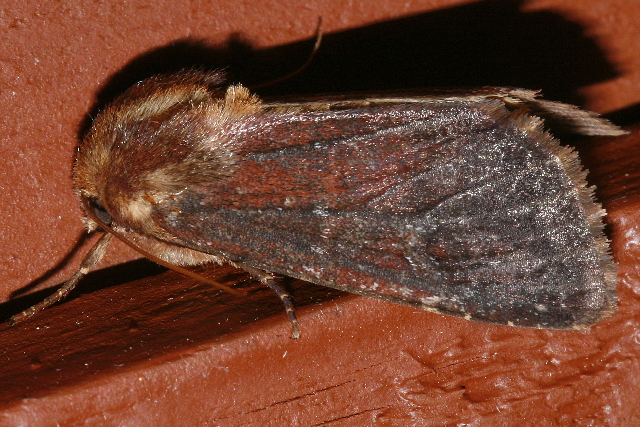

Scientific classification
- Kingdom: Animalia
- Phylum: Arthropoda
- Clade: Pancrustacea
- Class: Insecta
- Order: Lepidoptera
- Superfamily: Noctuoidea
- Family: Noctuidae
- Genus: Sideridis
- Species: S. maryx

Binomial name
- Sideridis maryx (Guenée, 1852)

= Sideridis maryx =

Species of moth

Sideridis maryx the maroonwing moth, is a species of moth native to North America. In the US state of Connecticut, it is listed as a species of special concern and is believed to be extirpated. The larval food plant is unknown, but it is suspected to be a specialist feeding on Arctostaphylos uva-ursi. The species was first described by Achille Guenée in 1852.
