= Megasis rippertella =

Scientific classification
- Kingdom: Animalia
- Phylum: Arthropoda
- Clade: Pancrustacea
- Class: Insecta
- Order: Lepidoptera
- Family: Pyralidae
- Genus: Megasis
- Species: M. rippertella

Binomial name
- Megasis rippertella (Zeller, 1839)

Synonyms
- Anerastia rippertella Zeller, 1839; Zophodia rippertella

Species of moth

Megasis rippertella is a species of snout moth. It is found in Spain, France, Switzerland, Austria, Italy, Bosnia and Herzegovina, North Macedonia, Greece, Bulgaria, Romania, Ukraine, Russia and Turkey.

The wingspan is about 35 mm.
