= Megasis noctileucella =

Scientific classification
- Kingdom: Animalia
- Phylum: Arthropoda
- Class: Insecta
- Order: Lepidoptera
- Family: Pyralidae
- Genus: Megasis
- Species: M. noctileucella

Binomial name
- Megasis noctileucella Ragonot, 1887

Species of moth

Megasis noctileucella was a species of snout moth in the genus Megasis. It was described by Ragonot in 1887, and is known from Armenia. It was later considered to be a junior synonym of Lambaesia fumosella (Ragonot, 1887)
