= Arsissa transvaalica =

Scientific classification
- Kingdom: Animalia
- Phylum: Arthropoda
- Class: Insecta
- Order: Lepidoptera
- Family: Pyralidae
- Genus: Arsissa
- Species: A. transvaalica

Binomial name
- Arsissa transvaalica Balinsky, 1991

Species of moth

Arsissa transvaalica is a species of snout moth in the genus Arsissa. It was described by Boris Balinsky in 1991 and is known from Namibia and South Africa.
