= Sideridis kitti =

Scientific classification
- Domain: Eukaryota
- Kingdom: Animalia
- Phylum: Arthropoda
- Class: Insecta
- Order: Lepidoptera
- Superfamily: Noctuoidea
- Family: Noctuidae
- Genus: Sideridis
- Species: S. kitti

Binomial name
- Sideridis kitti (Schawerda, 1914)

Species of moth

Sideridis kitti is a moth belonging to the family Noctuidae. The species was first described by Schawerda in 1914.

It is native to Eurasia.
