= Tsaraphycis mimeticella =

Scientific classification
- Kingdom: Animalia
- Phylum: Arthropoda
- Class: Insecta
- Order: Lepidoptera
- Family: Pyralidae
- Genus: Tsaraphycis
- Species: T. mimeticella

Binomial name
- Tsaraphycis mimeticella (Staudinger, 1879)

Synonyms
- Ancylosis mimeticella Staudinger, 1879; Megasis mimeticella; Megasis maritimella Caradja, 1910; Megasis tolli Amsel, 1954

Species of moth

Tsaraphycis mimeticella is a species of snout moth in the genus Tsaraphycis. It was described by Staudinger in 1879. It is found in France, Spain, Iran and Turkey.
