= Sideridis implexa =

Scientific classification
- Kingdom: Animalia
- Phylum: Arthropoda
- Clade: Pancrustacea
- Class: Insecta
- Order: Lepidoptera
- Superfamily: Noctuoidea
- Family: Noctuidae
- Genus: Sideridis
- Species: S. implexa

Binomial name
- Sideridis implexa (Hübner, 1813)

Synonyms
- Noctua implexa Hübner, 1809; Apamea fallovi Oberthüri, 1876; Saragossa implexa

Species of moth

Sideridis implexa is a species of moth of the family Noctuidae. It is found from Morocco to Libya, in Spain and from south-eastern Europe and the Balkans to Turkey, Israel, Lebanon and the Caucasian region.

Adults are on wing from March to April. There is one generation per year.

The larvae feed on Dianthus species.
