= Megasis alpherakii =

Scientific classification
- Kingdom: Animalia
- Phylum: Arthropoda
- Class: Insecta
- Order: Lepidoptera
- Family: Pyralidae
- Genus: Megasis
- Species: M. alpherakii

Binomial name
- Megasis alpherakii Ragonot, 1887

Species of moth

Megasis alpherakii is a species of snout moth in the genus Megasis. It was described by Ragonot in 1887, and is known from Xinjiang Province, China.
