= Arsissa pupillatella =

Scientific classification
- Kingdom: Animalia
- Phylum: Arthropoda
- Class: Insecta
- Order: Lepidoptera
- Family: Pyralidae
- Genus: Arsissa
- Species: A. pupillatella

Binomial name
- Arsissa pupillatella (Ragonot, 1887)

Synonyms
- Megasis pupillatella Ragonot, 1887

Species of moth

Arsissa pupillatella is a species of snout moth in the genus Arsissa. It was originally described as Megasis pupillatella by Émile Louis Ragonot in 1887, It is known from Turkmenistan (including Askhabad, the type location).
