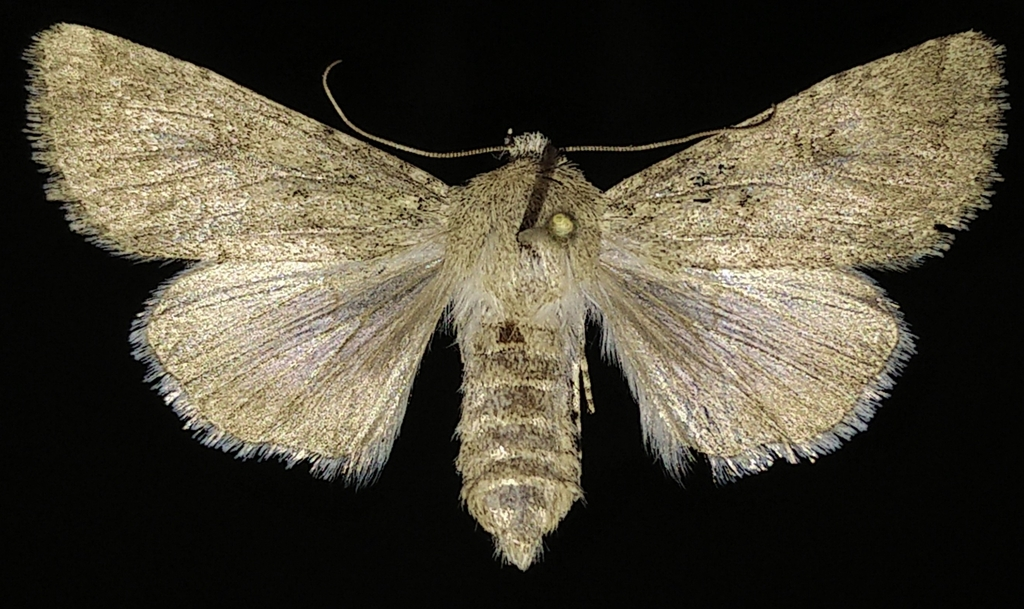

Scientific classification
- Kingdom: Animalia
- Phylum: Arthropoda
- Clade: Pancrustacea
- Class: Insecta
- Order: Lepidoptera
- Superfamily: Noctuoidea
- Family: Noctuidae
- Genus: Anarta
- Species: A. decepta

Binomial name
- Anarta decepta Grote, 1883

Synonyms
- Trichoclea postica Smith, 1891; Anarta postica (Smith, 1891); Trichoclea decepta

= Anarta decepta =

Species of moth

Anarta decepta is a species of moth in the family Noctuidae. It was first described by Augustus Radcliffe Grote in 1883 from Colorado and is found along the Pacific Coast of the United States and Canada. It was first discovered in Hawaii in light trap catches made in the Pearl Harbor area on Oahu in the autumn of 1947.

The wingspan is 28–29 mm.
