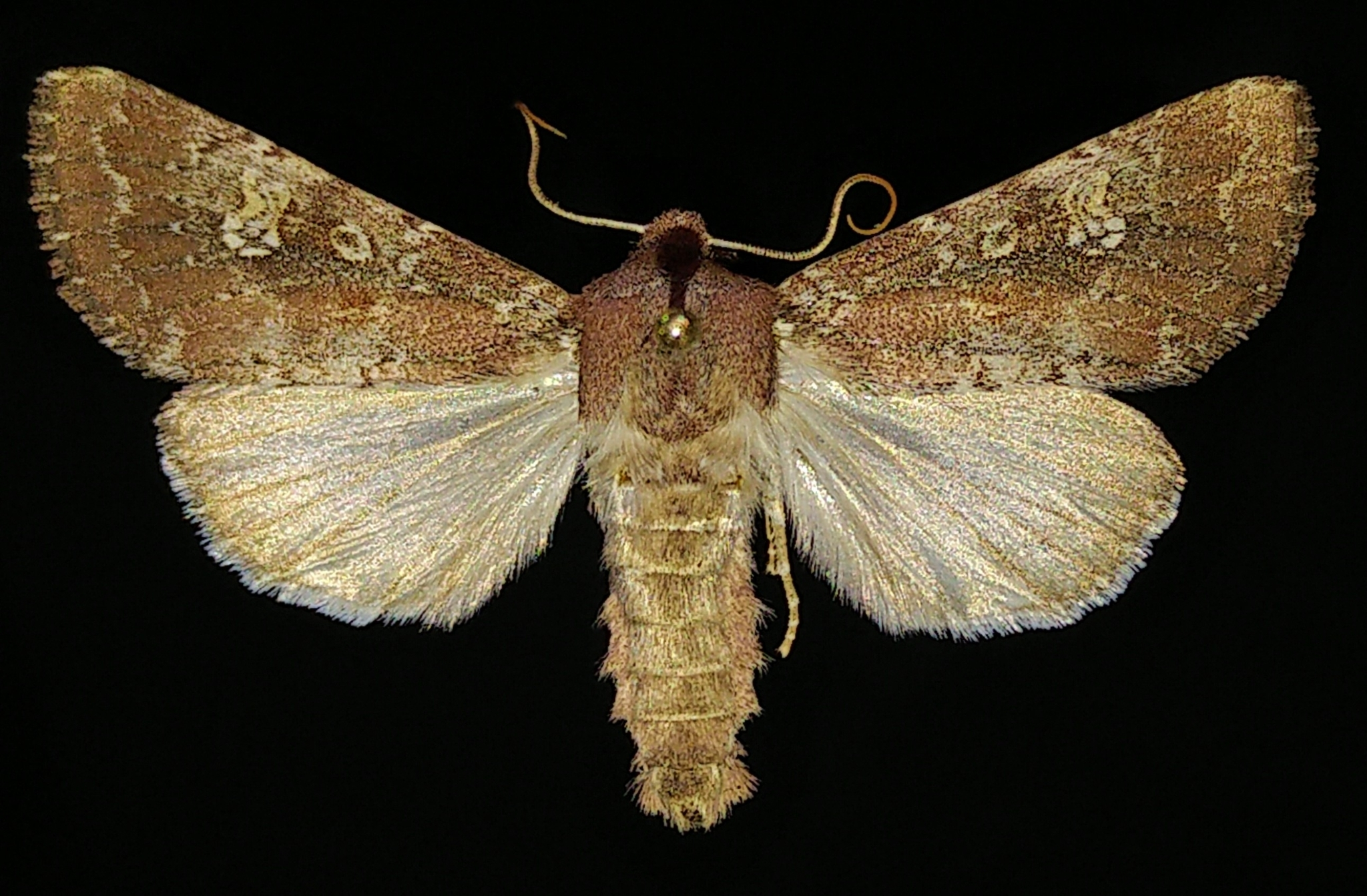

Scientific classification
- Domain: Eukaryota
- Kingdom: Animalia
- Phylum: Arthropoda
- Class: Insecta
- Order: Lepidoptera
- Superfamily: Noctuoidea
- Family: Noctuidae
- Genus: Sideridis
- Species: S. artesta

Binomial name
- Sideridis artesta (Smith, 1903)

= Sideridis artesta =

Hairy artesta moth

Species of moth

Sideridis artesta, the hairy artesta moth, is a species of cutworm or dart moth in the family Noctuidae. It is found in North America.
