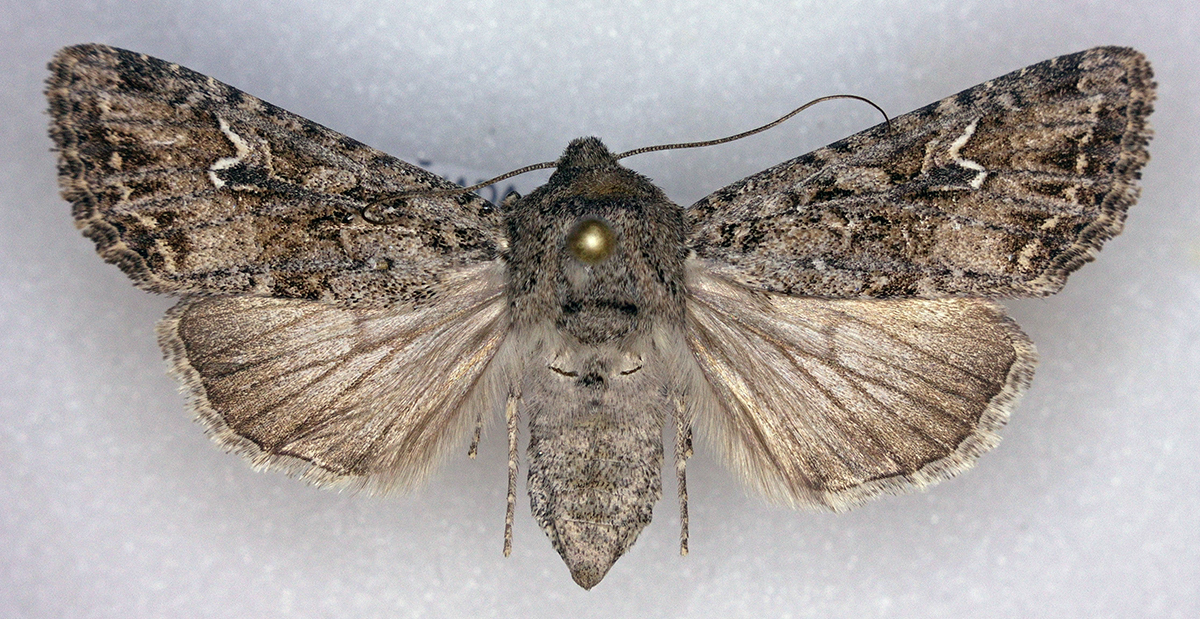

Conservation status
- Unranked (NatureServe)

Scientific classification
- Domain: Eukaryota
- Kingdom: Animalia
- Phylum: Arthropoda
- Class: Insecta
- Order: Lepidoptera
- Superfamily: Noctuoidea
- Family: Noctuidae
- Tribe: Hadenini
- Genus: Sideridis
- Species: S. fuscolutea

Binomial name
- Sideridis fuscolutea (Smith, 1892)

Synonyms
- Mamestra fuscolutea Smith, 1892; Trichoclea fuscolutea (Smith, 1892)

= Sideridis fuscolutea =

Species of moth

Sideridis fuscolutea is a species of moth in the family Noctuidae. It can be found in western North America.
