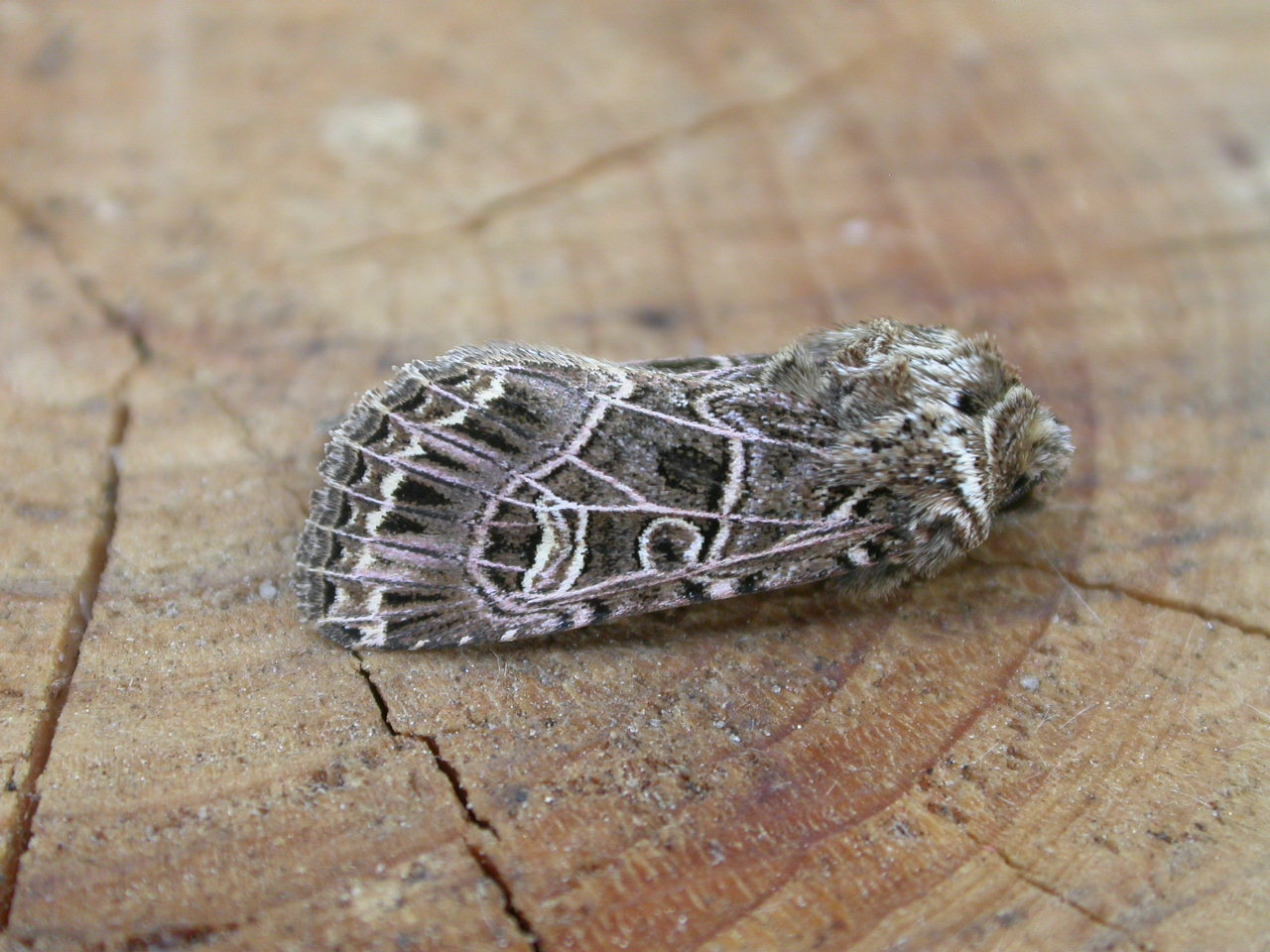
- Sideridis reticulata

Scientific classification
- Domain: Eukaryota
- Kingdom: Animalia
- Phylum: Arthropoda
- Class: Insecta
- Order: Lepidoptera
- Superfamily: Noctuoidea
- Family: Noctuidae
- Subfamily: Noctuinae
- Tribe: Hadenini
- Genus: Sideridis; Hübner, [1821]

= Sideridis =

Genus of moths

Sideridis is a genus of moths of the family Noctuidae raised by Jacob Hübner in 1821.

== Species ==
- Sideridis africana (Berio, 1977)
- Sideridis arcanus Hreblay & Plante, 1995
- Sideridis artesta (Smith, 1903)
- Sideridis bombycia (Eversmann, 1856)
- Sideridis chersotoides Wiltshire, 1956
- Sideridis cholica (Hampson, 1905)
- Sideridis congermana (Morrison, 1874)
- Sideridis discrepans (Walker, 1865)
- Sideridis egena (Lederer, 1853)
- Sideridis elaeochroa (Hampson, 1919)
- Sideridis fuscolutea (Smith, 1892)
- Sideridis herczigi Varga & Ronkay, 1991
- Sideridis honeyi (Yoshimoto, 1989)
- Sideridis implexa (Hübner, [1809])
- Sideridis incommoda (Staudinger, 1888)
- Sideridis irkutica Sukhareva, 1979
- Sideridis kitti (Schawerda, 1914)
- Sideridis lampra (Schawerda, 1913)
- Sideridis lohi (Noel, 1906)
- Sideridis mandarina (Leech, 1900)
- Sideridis marginata Köhler, 1947
- Sideridis maryx (Guenée, 1852)
- Sideridis mojave (Benjamin, 1932)
- Sideridis peculiaris (Staudinger, 1888)
- Sideridis remmi Kononenko, 1982
- Sideridis reticulata – Bordered Gothic (Goeze, 1781)
- Sideridis rivularis – The Campion (Fabricius, 1775)
- Sideridis rosea (Harvey, 1874)
- Sideridis ruisa (Forbes, 1913)
- Sideridis satanella (Alphéraky, 1892)
- Sideridis sericea Warren, 1915
- Sideridis simplex (Staudinger, 1889)
- Sideridis stoliczkana (Moore, 1878)
- Sideridis suavina (Draudt, 1950)
- Sideridis texturata (Alphéraky, 1892)
- Sideridis turbida (Esper, 1790)
- Sideridis unica (Leech, 1889)
- Sideridis uscripta (Smith, 1891)
- Sideridis unicolor (Alphéraky, 1889)
- Sideridis vindemialis (Guenée, 1852)

== Former species ==
- Sideridis palmillo is now Tricholita palmillo (Barner, 1907)
