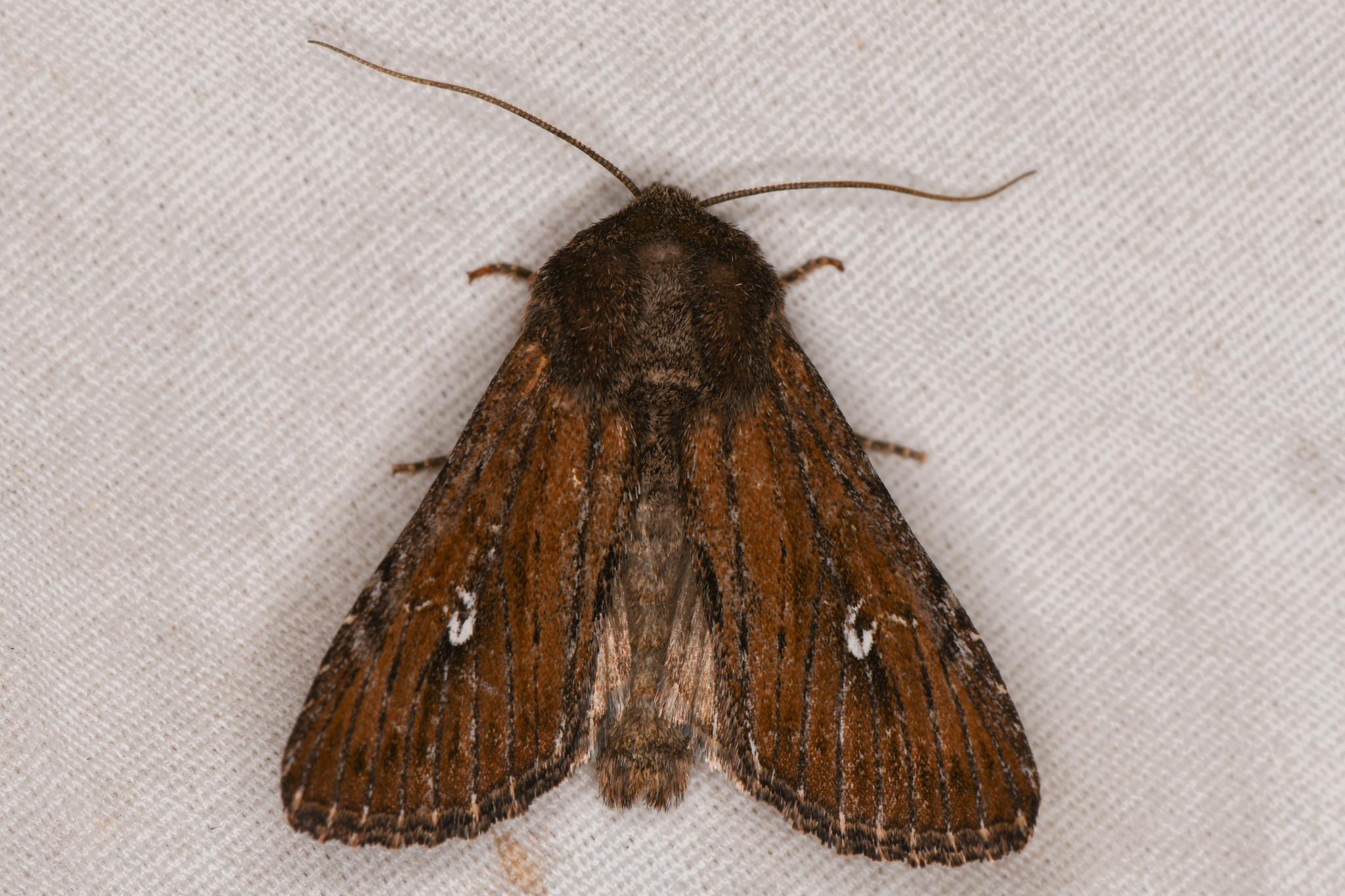

Scientific classification
- Kingdom: Animalia
- Phylum: Arthropoda
- Clade: Pancrustacea
- Class: Insecta
- Order: Lepidoptera
- Superfamily: Noctuoidea
- Family: Noctuidae
- Tribe: Hadenini
- Genus: Sideridis
- Species: S. u-scripta

Binomial name
- Sideridis u-scripta (Smith, 1891)

= Sideridis u-scripta =

Species of moth

Sideridis u-scripta is a species of cutworm or dart moth in the family Noctuidae. It is found in North America. It was originally described as Mamestra u-scripta Smith, 1891 from the Western USA, with specimens from "Sierra Nevada, California; Nevada County, California." The species name was later listed with the revised spelling "uscripta" in Hodges, 1983 (under a different genus from original), then several subsequent works continued to list similarly under the genus Sideridis. Then the original hyphenated spelling of the species name is restored as Sideridis u-scripta (Smith, 1891).
