= Sideridis ruisa =

Scientific classification
- Kingdom: Animalia
- Phylum: Arthropoda
- Clade: Pancrustacea
- Class: Insecta
- Order: Lepidoptera
- Superfamily: Noctuoidea
- Family: Noctuidae
- Tribe: Hadenini
- Genus: Sideridis
- Species: S. ruisa

Binomial name
- Sideridis ruisa Forbes, 1913

Species of moth

Sideridis ruisa is a species of cutworm or dart moth in the family Noctuidae. It is found in North America.

The MONA or Hodges number for Sideridis ruisa is 10262.
