= Tsaraphycis philippella =

Scientific classification
- Kingdom: Animalia
- Phylum: Arthropoda
- Class: Insecta
- Order: Lepidoptera
- Family: Pyralidae
- Genus: Tsaraphycis
- Species: T. philippella

Binomial name
- Tsaraphycis philippella (Viette, 1970)

Synonyms
- Megasis philippella (Viette, 1970)

Species of moth

Tsaraphycis philippella is a species of snout moth in the genus Tsaraphycis. It was described by Pierre Viette in 1970, and is known from northern Madagascar. It was later considered as Megasis philippella (Viette, 1970) by some authors, but again as the original Tsaraphycis philippella after Leraut, 2019.

Its wingspan is around 32–34 mm, length of the forewings is 17.5-18.5 mm. The forewings are dark grey with black spots, grey and brown zones. Rear wings are grey black.

The holotype was collected by P. Soga in Andilambe.
