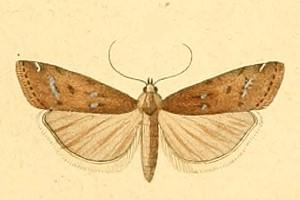

Scientific classification
- Kingdom: Animalia
- Phylum: Arthropoda
- Class: Insecta
- Order: Lepidoptera
- Family: Pyralidae
- Genus: Isauria
- Species: I. dilucidella

Binomial name
- Isauria dilucidella (Duponchel, 1836)

Synonyms
- Phycis dilucidella Duponchel, 1836; Myelois ilignella Zeller, 1839; Myelois crepusculella Lederer, 1870; Eucarphia incredibilis Staudinger, 1879; Phycis laternella Eversmann, 1844; Megasis satanella Ragonot, 1887; =Adelosemia satanella (Ragonot, 1887) Per?; Adelosemia subsoritella Ragonot, 1887; Adelosemia odontella Ragonot, 1893; Isauria ledereri (Ragonot, 1893); Megasis cuencella Caradja, 1916; Pseudomegasis gabalitella Chrétien, 1931; Megasis ilignella grisescens D. Lucas, 1950; Divona (Megasis) parvella Amsel, 1951; Divona shahidanella Amsel, 1970

= Isauria dilucidella =

Species of moth

Isauria dilucidella is a species of moth in the family Pyralidae. It was described by Philogène Auguste Joseph Duponchel in 1836. It is found in most of Europe (except Portugal, Ireland, Great Britain, Fennoscandia, the Benelux, Poland and the Baltic region), Algeria, the United Arab Emirates, Syria, Lebanon, the Palestinian territories, Iraq, Turkmenistan, Mongolia, as well as Georgia, Kazakhstan, Armenia, Turkey, Iran and Afghanistan.

The wingspan is 19–24 mm.

The larvae feed on Lotus corniculatus and Astragalus monspessulanus.
