= T. pulchra =

T. pulchra may refer to:

- Tibouchina pulchra, a synonym of Pleroma raddianum, a glory bush
- Tillandsia pulchra, a plant found in the Americas
- Timia pulchra, a picture-winged fly
- Titanio pulchra, a grass moth
- Tritonia pulchra, a sea slug
