= T. carbonaria =

T. carbonaria may refer to:

- Tetragonula carbonaria, a stingless bee species endemic to Australia
- Timia carbonaria, a picture-winged fly species

== See also ==
- Carbonaria (disambiguation)
