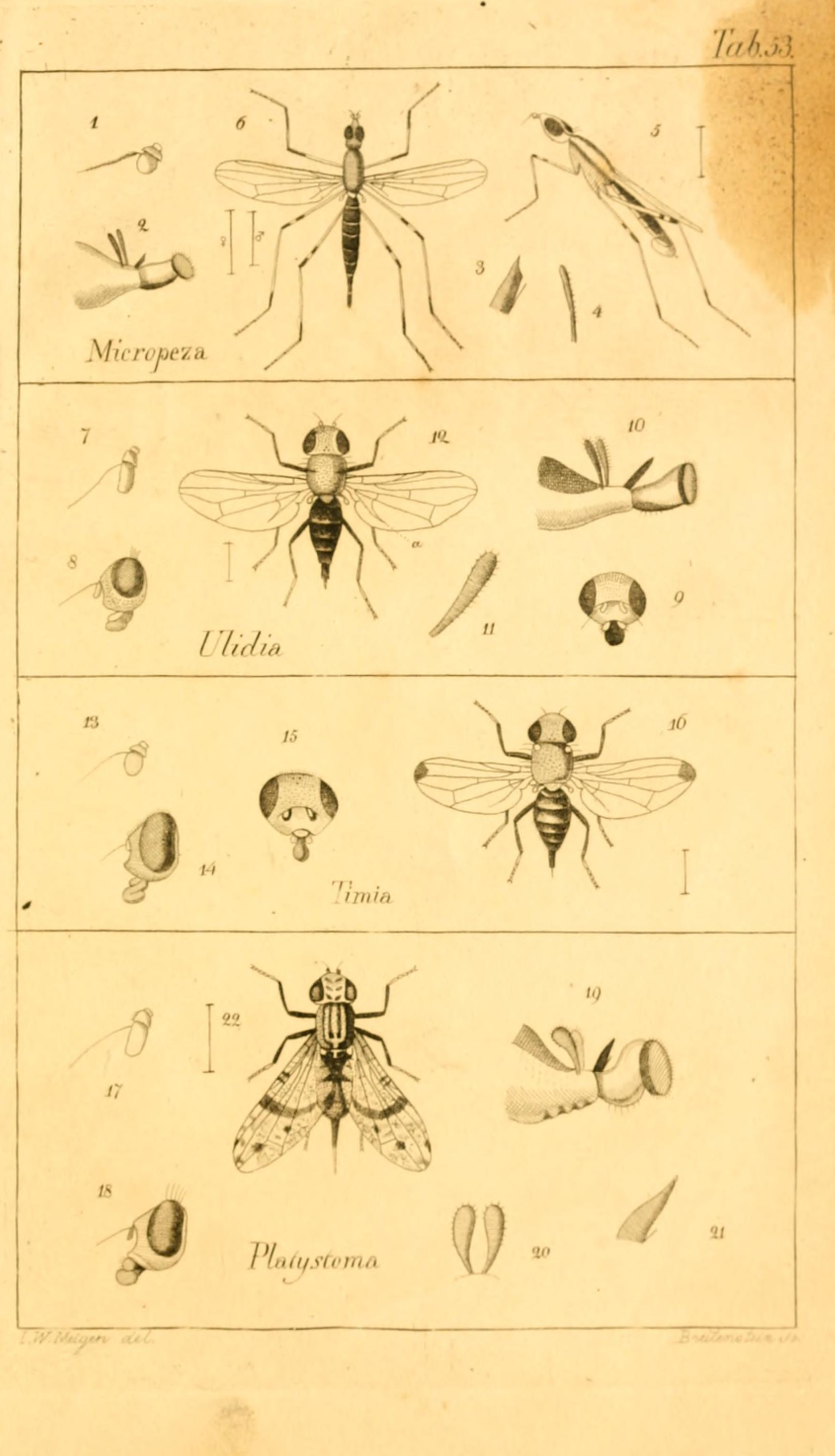
- Timia in Meigen Systematische Beschreibung der bekannten europäischen zweiflügeligen Insekten 1826

Scientific classification
- Kingdom: Animalia
- Phylum: Arthropoda
- Class: Insecta
- Order: Diptera
- Family: Ulidiidae
- Subfamily: Ulidiinae
- Tribe: Ulidiini
- Genus: Timia; Wiedemann, 1824

Type species
- Timia erythrocephala Wiedemann, 1824

= Timia (fly) =

Genus of flies

Timia is a genus of flies in the family Ulidiidae, which is difficult to separate from the genus Ulidia.

== Species ==
- T. abstersa Loew, 1873
- T. albiantennata Zaitzev, 1984
- T. albifacies Gorodkov & Zaitzev, 1986
- T. alini Hering, 1938
- T. altaica Galinskaya, 2014
- T. amoena Loew, 1874
- T. anomala Becker, 1907
- T. apicalis Wiedemann, 1824
- T. arianica Gregor, 1970
- T. asiatica Zaitzev, 1982
- T. berlandi Séguy, 1953
- T. beybienkoi Zaitzev, 1982
- T. camillae Mik, 1889
- T. canaliculata Becker, 1906
- T. carbonaria Hendel, 1908
- T. danieli Gregor, 1970
- T. desparsata Enderlein, 1934
- T. dimidiata Becker, 1906
- T. emeljanovi Zaitzev, 1982
- T. emiliae Zaitzev, 1982
- T. erythrocephala Wiedemann, 1824
- T. flaveola Galinskaya, 2011
- T. gobica Zaitzev, 1982
- T. golbeki Gorodkov & Zaitzev, 1986
- T. gussakovskyi Gorodkov & Zaitzev, 1986
- T. hirtipes Hendel, 1908
- T. jakowlewi Hendel, 1908
- T. kaszabi Zaitzev, 1982
- T. kerzhneri Zaitzev, 1982
- T. klugi Hendel, 1908
- T. komarowii Mik, 1889
- T. libani Gregor, 1970
- T. melanorrhina Loew, 1866
- T. mokhnata Galinskaya, 2014
- T. mongolica Zaitzev, 1982
- T. monticola Becker, 1906
- T. nasuta Mik, 1889
- T. nigriantennata Zaitzev, 1982
- T. nigriceps Hendel, 1908
- T. nigrimana Loew, 1866
- T. nigripes Mik, 1889
- T. nitida Hendel, 1935
- T. orientalis Zaitzev, 1982
- T. pamirensis Hennig, 1940
- T. paramoena Hennig, 1940
- T. parva Hendel, 1908
- T. persica Hennig, 1965
- T. planiceps Hendel, 1910
- T. polychaeta Kameneva, 1996
- T. problematica Hennig, 1965
- T. protuberans Becker, 1906
- T. pubescens Zaitzev, 1982
- T. pulchra Roder, 1889
- T. punctulata Becker, 1906
- T. reitteri Hendel, 1908
- T. rugifrons
- T. testacea Portschinsky, 1891
- T. turgida Becker, 1906
- T. xanthaspis Loew, 1868
- T. xanthostoma Becker, 1907
- T. zaitzevi Galinskaya, 2011
