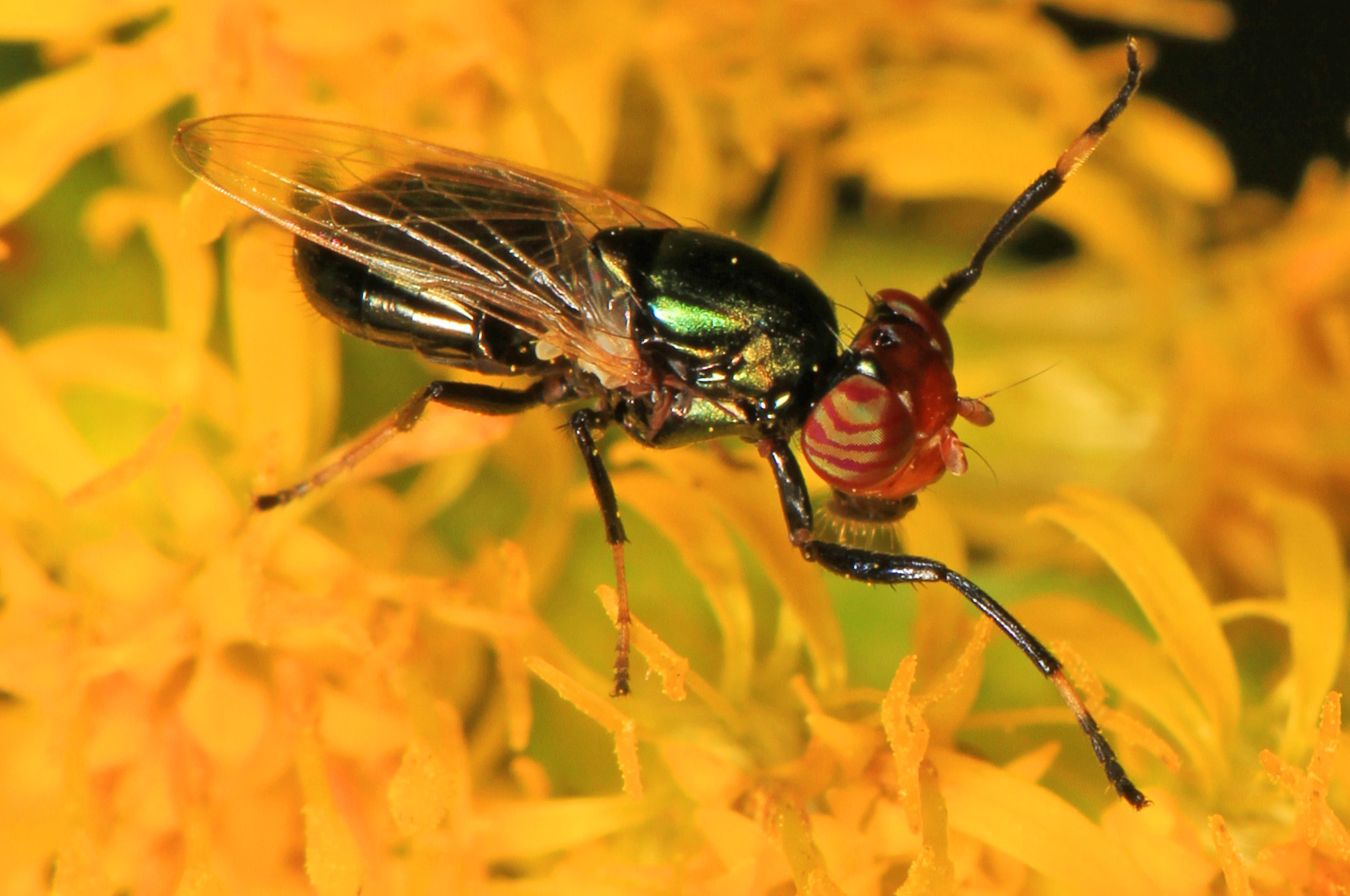
- Physiphora alceae

Scientific classification
- Domain: Eukaryota
- Kingdom: Animalia
- Phylum: Arthropoda
- Class: Insecta
- Order: Diptera
- Family: Ulidiidae
- Subfamily: Ulidiinae
- Tribe: Ulidiini; Macquart, 1835

= Ulidiini =

Tribe of flies in the family Ulidiidae

Ulidiini is a tribe of picture-winged flies in the family Ulidiidae that live in the arid and sub arid regions of the Palaearctic. There are three genera and around 100 species within the tribe. The tribe was first named in 1835; its type genus is Ulidia.

Species in tribe Ulidiini are small and mostly black and brown in color. They can be distinguished from other tribes of the family Ulidiidae by the apical structure of the phallus.

Genera in the tribe Ulidiini include:

- Physiphora Fallén, 1810
- Timia Wiedemann, 1824
- Ulidia Meigen, 1826
