= U. nitida =

U. nitida may refer to:

- Ulidia nitida, a picture-winged fly species
- Uropeltis nitida, a non-venomous shield tail snake species found in southern India

== See also ==
- Nitida (disambiguation)
