= Titanio pulchellalis =

Scientific classification
- Domain: Eukaryota
- Kingdom: Animalia
- Phylum: Arthropoda
- Class: Insecta
- Order: Lepidoptera
- Family: Crambidae
- Subfamily: Odontiinae
- Tribe: Odontiini
- Genus: Titanio
- Species: T. pulchellalis

Binomial name
- Titanio pulchellalis (Staudinger, 1892)

Synonyms
- Noctuomorpha pulchellalis Staudinger, 1892

Species of moth

Titanio pulchellalis is a moth in the family Crambidae. It was described by Staudinger in 1892. It is found in Uzbekistan.
