= Titanio emiralis =

Scientific classification
- Domain: Eukaryota
- Kingdom: Animalia
- Phylum: Arthropoda
- Class: Insecta
- Order: Lepidoptera
- Family: Crambidae
- Subfamily: Odontiinae
- Tribe: Odontiini
- Genus: Titanio
- Species: T. emiralis

Binomial name
- Titanio emiralis Caradja, 1916

Species of moth

Titanio emiralis is a moth in the family Crambidae. It was described by Aristide Caradja in 1916. It is found in eastern Turkestan.
