= Ulidia nitens =

Scientific classification
- Kingdom: Animalia
- Phylum: Arthropoda
- Class: Insecta
- Order: Diptera
- Family: Ulidiidae
- Genus: Ulidia
- Species: U. nitens

Binomial name
- Ulidia nitens Loew, 1845

Species of fly

Ulidia nitens is a species of ulidiid or picture-winged fly in the genus Ulidia of the family Ulidiidae.
