= Ulidia nigricubitalis =

Scientific classification
- Kingdom: Animalia
- Phylum: Arthropoda
- Class: Insecta
- Order: Diptera
- Family: Ulidiidae
- Genus: Ulidia
- Species: U. nigricubitalis

Binomial name
- Ulidia nigricubitalis Zaitzev, 1982

Species of fly

Ulidia nigricubitalis is a species of ulidiid or picture-winged fly in the genus Ulidia of the family Ulidiidae.
