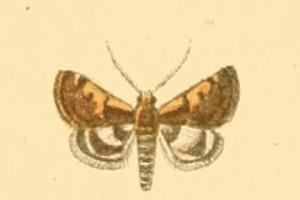
- Titanio magnificalis

Scientific classification
- Domain: Eukaryota
- Kingdom: Animalia
- Phylum: Arthropoda
- Class: Insecta
- Order: Lepidoptera
- Family: Crambidae
- Subfamily: Odontiinae
- Tribe: Odontiini
- Genus: Titanio; Hübner, 1825

Synonyms
- Noctuomorpha Guenée, 1854; Titania J. L. R. Agassiz, 1846; Cleptotypodes Minet, 1983; Denticornutia M. O. Martin, 1986

= Titanio =

Genus of moths

Titanio is a genus of moths of the family Crambidae.

== Species ==
- Titanio basalis Caradja, 1928
- Titanio caradjae (Rebel, 1902)
- Titanio emiralis Caradja, 1916
- Titanio eponyma Meyrick, 1890
- Titanio heliothalis (Staudinger, 1892)
- Titanio hesperialis Hampson, 1900
- Titanio hyrcanella Amsel, 1950
- Titanio ledereri (Staudinger, 1870)
- Titanio magnificalis (Christoph, 1877)
- Titanio metaxanthalis Hampson, 1900
- Titanio modestalis (Christoph, 1877)
- Titanio mortualis Caradja, 1916
- Titanio nawaralis Amsel, 1970
- Titanio nissalis Amsel, 1951
- Titanio normalis (Hübner, 1796)
- Titanio originalis (Herrich-Schäffer, 1860)
- Titanio orphnolyca Meyrick, 1936
- Titanio pulchellalis (Staudinger, 1892)
- Titanio pulchra Rebel, 1902
- Titanio safedalis Amsel, 1970
- Titanio sarekandalis Amsel, 1970
- Titanio schivalis Amsel, 1970
- Titanio sultanalis (Staudinger, 1892)
- Titanio tarraconensis Leraut & Luquet, 1982
- Titanio venustalis Lederer, 1855

== Former species ==
- Titanio angustipennis Zerny, 1914
