= Physiphora nasoni =

Scientific classification
- Kingdom: Animalia
- Phylum: Arthropoda
- Class: Insecta
- Order: Diptera
- Family: Ulidiidae
- Genus: Physiphora
- Species: P. nasoni

Binomial name
- Physiphora nasoni Cresson, 1913

Species of fly

Physiphora nasoni is a species of ulidiid or picture-winged fly in the genus Physiphora of the family Ulidiidae.
