= Ulidia splendida =

Scientific classification
- Kingdom: Animalia
- Phylum: Arthropoda
- Class: Insecta
- Order: Diptera
- Family: Ulidiidae
- Genus: Ulidia
- Species: U. splendida

Binomial name
- Ulidia splendida Zaitzev, 1982

Species of fly

Ulidia splendida is a species of ulidiid or picture-winged fly in the genus Ulidia of the family Ulidiidae.
