= Titanio originalis =

Scientific classification
- Domain: Eukaryota
- Kingdom: Animalia
- Phylum: Arthropoda
- Class: Insecta
- Order: Lepidoptera
- Family: Crambidae
- Subfamily: Odontiinae
- Tribe: Odontiini
- Genus: Titanio
- Species: T. originalis

Binomial name
- Titanio originalis (Herrich-Schaffer, 1860)

Synonyms
- Hercyna originalis Herrich-Schaffer, 1860

Species of moth

Titanio originalis is a species of moth in the family Crambidae. It is found in Russia.
