= Timia parva =

Scientific classification
- Kingdom: Animalia
- Phylum: Arthropoda
- Clade: Pancrustacea
- Class: Insecta
- Order: Diptera
- Family: Ulidiidae
- Genus: Timia
- Species: T. parva

Binomial name
- Timia parva Hendel, 1908

Species of fly

Timia parva is a species of ulidiid or picture-winged fly in the genus Timia of the family Ulidiidae.
