= Ulidia melampodia =

Scientific classification
- Kingdom: Animalia
- Phylum: Arthropoda
- Class: Insecta
- Order: Diptera
- Family: Ulidiidae
- Genus: Ulidia
- Species: U. melampodia

Binomial name
- Ulidia melampodia Loew, 1873

Species of fly

Ulidia melampodia is a species of ulidiid or picture-winged fly in the genus Ulidia of the family Ulidiidae.
