= Titanio heliothalis =

Scientific classification
- Domain: Eukaryota
- Kingdom: Animalia
- Phylum: Arthropoda
- Class: Insecta
- Order: Lepidoptera
- Family: Crambidae
- Subfamily: Odontiinae
- Tribe: Odontiini
- Genus: Titanio
- Species: T. heliothalis

Binomial name
- Titanio heliothalis (Staudinger, 1892)

Synonyms
- Hercyna heliothalis Staudinger, 1892

Species of moth

Titanio heliothalis is a moth in the family Crambidae. It was described by Staudinger in 1892. It is found in Central Asia, where it has been recorded from the Alay Mountains.
