= Titanio caradjae =

Scientific classification
- Kingdom: Animalia
- Phylum: Arthropoda
- Class: Insecta
- Order: Lepidoptera
- Family: Crambidae
- Subfamily: Odontiinae
- Tribe: Odontiini
- Genus: Titanio
- Species: T. caradjae

Binomial name
- Titanio caradjae (Rebel, 1902)

Synonyms
- Atychia caradjae Rebel, 1902

Species of moth

Titanio caradjae is a moth in the family Crambidae. It was described by Rebel in 1902. It is found in Turkey.
