= Timia mokhnata =

Scientific classification
- Kingdom: Animalia
- Phylum: Arthropoda
- Class: Insecta
- Order: Diptera
- Family: Ulidiidae
- Genus: Timia
- Species: T. mokhnata

Binomial name
- Timia mokhnata Galinskaya, 2014

Species of fly

Timia mokhnata is a species of ulidiid or picture-winged fly in the genus Timia of the family Ulidiidae.
