= Ulidia facialis =

Scientific classification
- Kingdom: Animalia
- Phylum: Arthropoda
- Class: Insecta
- Order: Diptera
- Family: Ulidiidae
- Genus: Ulidia
- Species: U. facialis

Binomial name
- Ulidia facialis Hendel, 1931

Species of fly

Ulidia facialis is a species of ulidiid or picture-winged fly in the genus Ulidia of the family Ulidiidae.
