= Physiphora elbae =

Scientific classification
- Kingdom: Animalia
- Phylum: Arthropoda
- Class: Insecta
- Order: Diptera
- Family: Ulidiidae
- Genus: Physiphora
- Species: P. elbae

Binomial name
- Physiphora elbae Steyskal, 1968

Species of fly

Physiphora elbae is a species of ulidiid or picture-winged fly in the genus Physiphora of the family Ulidiidae.
