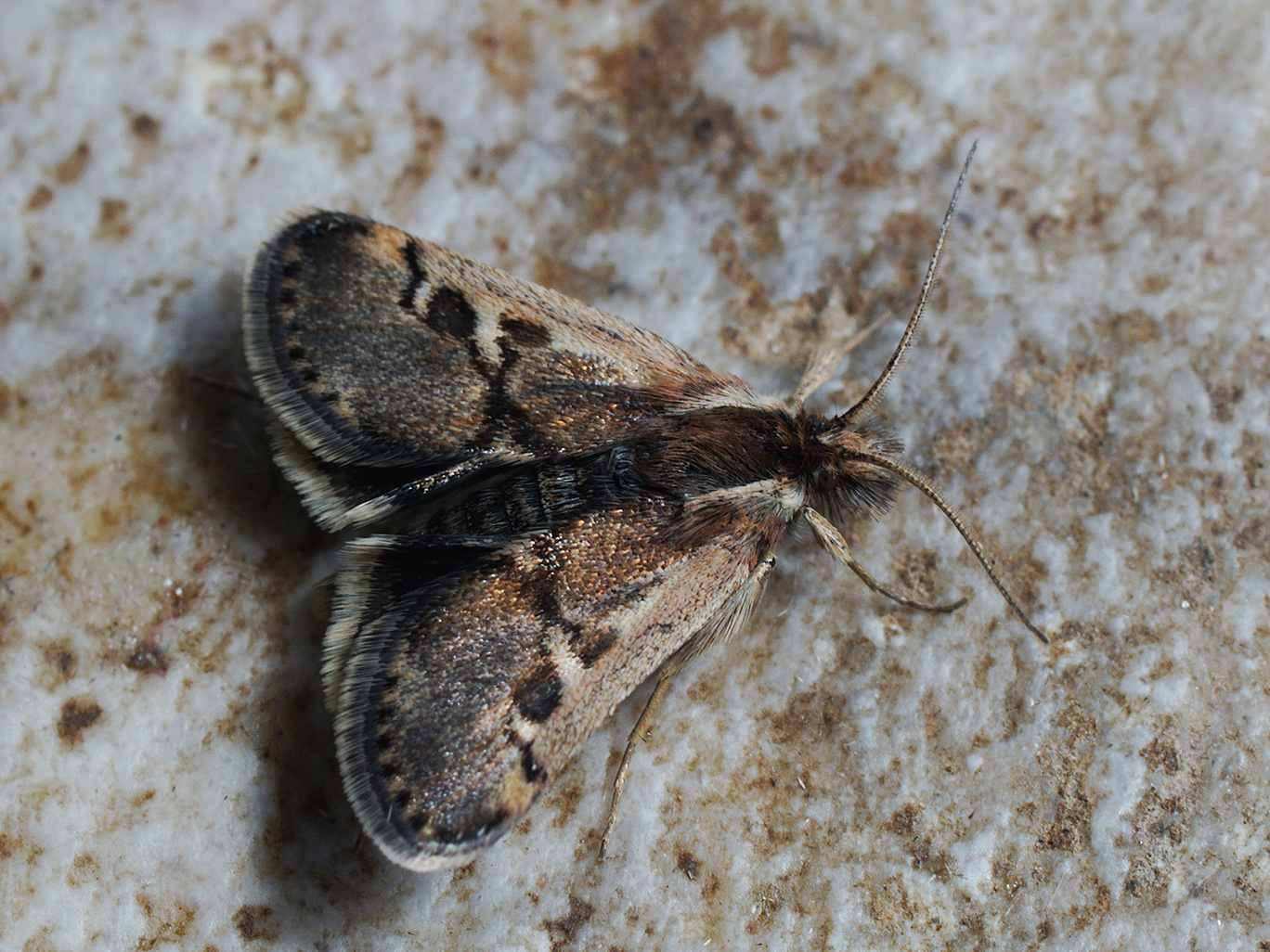

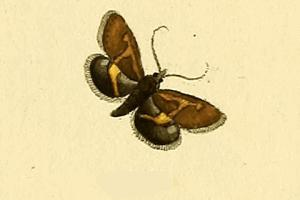

Scientific classification
- Domain: Eukaryota
- Kingdom: Animalia
- Phylum: Arthropoda
- Class: Insecta
- Order: Lepidoptera
- Family: Crambidae
- Subfamily: Odontiinae
- Tribe: Odontiini
- Genus: Titanio
- Species: T. normalis

Binomial name
- Titanio normalis (Hubner, 1796)

Synonyms
- Pyralis normalis Hubner, 1796; Pyralis comitalis Hübner, 1819; Noctuomorpha normalis var. ancyrensis O. Hofmann, 1898; Titanio normata Duponchel, 1844

= Titanio normalis =

Species of moth

Titanio normalis is a species of moth in the family Crambidae. It is found in Spain, Italy, Austria, the Czech Republic, Slovakia, Hungary, Croatia, Romania, Bulgaria, the Republic of Macedonia, Greece, Belarus, Russia and Turkey.

The larvae feed on Convolvulus species. They mine the leaves of their host plant. They mine the leaf from within this tube. Pupation takes place outside of the mine. Larvae can be found in September.
