= Titanio sultanalis =

Scientific classification
- Domain: Eukaryota
- Kingdom: Animalia
- Phylum: Arthropoda
- Class: Insecta
- Order: Lepidoptera
- Family: Crambidae
- Subfamily: Odontiinae
- Tribe: Odontiini
- Genus: Titanio
- Species: T. sultanalis

Binomial name
- Titanio sultanalis (Staudinger, 1892)

Synonyms
- Hercyna sultanalis Staudinger, 1892; Hercyna sultanalis var. splendens Staudinger, 1893

Species of moth

Titanio sultanalis is a moth in the family Crambidae. It was described by Staudinger in 1892. It is found in Uzbekistan.
