= Titanio metaxanthalis =

Scientific classification
- Domain: Eukaryota
- Kingdom: Animalia
- Phylum: Arthropoda
- Class: Insecta
- Order: Lepidoptera
- Family: Crambidae
- Subfamily: Odontiinae
- Tribe: Odontiini
- Genus: Titanio
- Species: T. metaxanthalis

Binomial name
- Titanio metaxanthalis Hampson, 1900

Species of moth

Titanio metaxanthalis is a moth in the family Crambidae. It was described by George Hampson in 1900. It is found in the Tian Shan mountains in Central Asia.
