= Ulidia parallela =

Scientific classification
- Kingdom: Animalia
- Phylum: Arthropoda
- Class: Insecta
- Order: Diptera
- Family: Ulidiidae
- Genus: Ulidia
- Species: U. parallela

Binomial name
- Ulidia parallela Loew, 1845

Species of fly

Ulidia parallela is a species of ulidiid or picture-winged fly in the genus Ulidia of the family Tephritidae.
