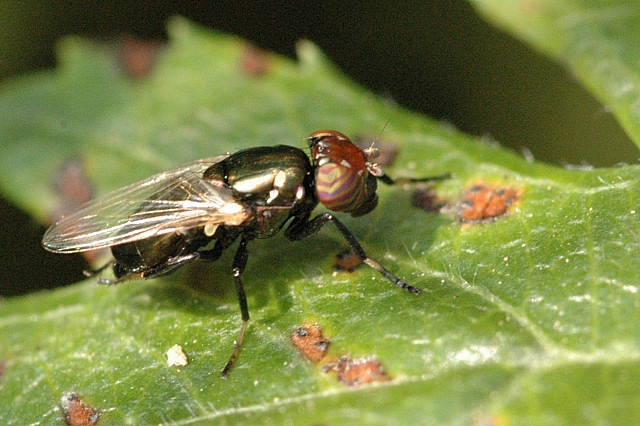
- Physiphora alceae

Scientific classification
- Kingdom: Animalia
- Phylum: Arthropoda
- Clade: Pancrustacea
- Class: Insecta
- Order: Diptera
- Family: Ulidiidae
- Subfamily: Ulidiinae
- Tribe: Ulidiini
- Genus: Physiphora; Fallén, 1810

Type species
- Chrysomyza splendida (= Physiphora demandata (Fabricius)) Fallén, 1817

Synonyms
- Chrysomyza Fallén, 1817; Physophora Agassiz, 1846 (missp.); Chloria Schiner, 1862; Cliochloria Enderlein, 1927

= Physiphora =

Genus of flies

Physiphora is a genus of flies in the family Ulidiidae, containing over 30 species worldwide.

== Distribution ==
The distribution of this genus is largely African, but a few endemic species are found in Asia as far as the Solomon Islands. Some species have been introduced into the Americas and Australasia. The species P. alceae (Preyssler) is cosmopolitan.

== Selected species ==
- Physiphora alceae (Preyssler, 1791)
- Physiphora aenea (Fabricius, 1794)
- Physiphora elbae Steyskal, 1968
- Physiphora euphorbiana Krivosheina & Krivosheina, 1997
- Physiphora flavipes (Karsch, 1888)
- Physiphora hainanensis Chen, 2007
- Physiphora hendeli (Johnson, 1913)
- Physiphora laticauda (Loew, 1873)
- Physiphora nasoni Cresson, 1913
- Physiphora smaragdina Loew, 1852
- Physiphora tenuis Loew, 1868
