= Ulidia salonikiensis =

Scientific classification
- Kingdom: Animalia
- Phylum: Arthropoda
- Clade: Pancrustacea
- Class: Insecta
- Order: Diptera
- Family: Ulidiidae
- Genus: Ulidia
- Species: U. salonikiensis

Binomial name
- Ulidia salonikiensis Hennig, 1940

Species of fly

Ulidia salonikiensis is a species of ulidiid or picture-winged fly in the genus Ulidia of the family Tephritidae.
