= Physiphora tenuis =

Scientific classification
- Kingdom: Animalia
- Phylum: Arthropoda
- Class: Insecta
- Order: Diptera
- Family: Ulidiidae
- Genus: Physiphora
- Species: P. tenuis

Binomial name
- Physiphora tenuis Loew, 1868

Species of fly

Physiphora tenuis is a species of ulidiid or picture-winged fly in the genus Physiphora of the family Ulidiidae.
