= Physiphora laticauda =

Scientific classification
- Kingdom: Animalia
- Phylum: Arthropoda
- Clade: Pancrustacea
- Class: Insecta
- Order: Diptera
- Family: Ulidiidae
- Genus: Physiphora
- Species: P. laticauda

Binomial name
- Physiphora laticauda (Loew, 1873)

Synonyms
- Steneretma laticauda Loew, 1873

Species of fly

Physiphora laticauda is a species of ulidiid or picture-winged fly in the genus Physiphora of the family Ulidiidae.
