= Ulidia atrata =

Scientific classification
- Kingdom: Animalia
- Phylum: Arthropoda
- Class: Insecta
- Order: Diptera
- Family: Ulidiidae
- Genus: Ulidia
- Species: U. atrata

Binomial name
- Ulidia atrata Loew, 1868

Species of fly

Ulidia atrata is a species of ulidiid or picture-winged fly in the genus Ulidia of the family Ulidiidae.
