= Titanio eponyma =

Scientific classification
- Domain: Eukaryota
- Kingdom: Animalia
- Phylum: Arthropoda
- Class: Insecta
- Order: Lepidoptera
- Family: Crambidae
- Subfamily: Odontiinae
- Tribe: Odontiini
- Genus: Titanio
- Species: T. eponyma

Binomial name
- Titanio eponyma Meyrick, 1890

Species of moth

Titanio eponyma is a moth in the family Crambidae. It was described by Edward Meyrick in 1890. It is found in Transcaucasia.
