= Timia turgida =

Scientific classification
- Kingdom: Animalia
- Phylum: Arthropoda
- Class: Insecta
- Order: Diptera
- Family: Ulidiidae
- Genus: Timia
- Species: T. turgida

Binomial name
- Timia turgida Becker, 1906

Species of fly

Timia turgida is a species of ulidiid or picture-winged fly in the genus Timia of the family Ulidiidae.
