= Titanio nissalis =

Scientific classification
- Domain: Eukaryota
- Kingdom: Animalia
- Phylum: Arthropoda
- Class: Insecta
- Order: Lepidoptera
- Family: Crambidae
- Subfamily: Odontiinae
- Tribe: Odontiini
- Genus: Titanio
- Species: T. nissalis

Binomial name
- Titanio nissalis Amsel, 1951

Species of moth

Titanio nissalis is a moth in the family Crambidae. It was described by Hans Georg Amsel in 1951 and is found in Iran.
