= Titanio tarraconensis =

Scientific classification
- Domain: Eukaryota
- Kingdom: Animalia
- Phylum: Arthropoda
- Class: Insecta
- Order: Lepidoptera
- Family: Crambidae
- Subfamily: Odontiinae
- Tribe: Odontiini
- Genus: Titanio
- Species: T. tarraconensis

Binomial name
- Titanio tarraconensis Leraut & Luquet, 1982

Synonyms
- Titanio tarraconensis mauretanica P. Leraut & Luquet, 1982

Species of moth

Titanio tarraconensis is a species of moth in the family Crambidae. It is found in France, Spain and North Africa, including Morocco.
