= Titanio modestalis =

Scientific classification
- Domain: Eukaryota
- Kingdom: Animalia
- Phylum: Arthropoda
- Class: Insecta
- Order: Lepidoptera
- Family: Crambidae
- Subfamily: Odontiinae
- Tribe: Odontiini
- Genus: Titanio
- Species: T. modestalis

Binomial name
- Titanio modestalis (Christoph, 1877)

Synonyms
- Noctuomorpha modestalis Christoph, 1877

Species of moth

Titanio modestalis is a moth in the family Crambidae. It was described by Hugo Theodor Christoph in 1877. It is found in Turkmenistan.
