= Titanio venustalis =

Scientific classification
- Kingdom: Animalia
- Phylum: Arthropoda
- Clade: Pancrustacea
- Class: Insecta
- Order: Lepidoptera
- Family: Crambidae
- Subfamily: Odontiinae
- Tribe: Odontiini
- Genus: Titanio
- Species: T. venustalis

Binomial name
- Titanio venustalis (Lederer, 1855)

Synonyms
- Titanio echinaea Meyrick, 1891

Species of moth

Titanio venustalis is a species of moth in the family Crambidae. It is found in Greece and North Macedonia.
