= Titanio sarekandalis =

Scientific classification
- Domain: Eukaryota
- Kingdom: Animalia
- Phylum: Arthropoda
- Class: Insecta
- Order: Lepidoptera
- Family: Crambidae
- Subfamily: Odontiinae
- Tribe: Odontiini
- Genus: Titanio
- Species: T. sarekandalis

Binomial name
- Titanio sarekandalis Amsel, 1970

Species of moth

Titanio sarekandalis is a moth in the family Crambidae. It was described by Hans Georg Amsel in 1970 and is found in Afghanistan.
