= Timia flaveola =

Scientific classification
- Kingdom: Animalia
- Phylum: Arthropoda
- Class: Insecta
- Order: Diptera
- Family: Ulidiidae
- Genus: Timia
- Species: T. flaveola

Binomial name
- Timia flaveola Galinskaya, 2011

Species of fly

Timia flaveola is a species of ulidiid or picture-winged fly in the genus Timia of the family Ulidiidae.
