= Titanio orphnolyca =

Scientific classification
- Domain: Eukaryota
- Kingdom: Animalia
- Phylum: Arthropoda
- Class: Insecta
- Order: Lepidoptera
- Family: Crambidae
- Subfamily: Odontiinae
- Tribe: Odontiini
- Genus: Titanio
- Species: T. orphnolyca

Binomial name
- Titanio orphnolyca Meyrick, 1936

Species of moth

Titanio orphnolyca is a moth in the family Crambidae. It was described by Edward Meyrick in 1936. It is found in Morocco.
