= Ulidia smaragdina =

Scientific classification
- Kingdom: Animalia
- Phylum: Arthropoda
- Class: Insecta
- Order: Diptera
- Family: Ulidiidae
- Genus: Ulidia
- Species: U. smaragdina

Binomial name
- Ulidia smaragdina Loew, 1852

Species of fly

Ulidia smaragdina is a species of ulidiid or picture-winged fly in the genus Ulidia of the family Ulidiidae.
