= Physiphora aenea =

Scientific classification
- Kingdom: Animalia
- Phylum: Arthropoda
- Class: Insecta
- Order: Diptera
- Family: Ulidiidae
- Genus: Physiphora
- Species: P. aenea

Binomial name
- Physiphora aenea (Fabricius, 1794)

Species of fly

Physiphora aenea is a species of ulidiid or picture-winged fly in the genus Physiphora of the family Ulidiidae.
