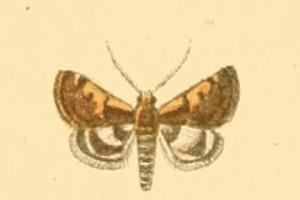

Scientific classification
- Domain: Eukaryota
- Kingdom: Animalia
- Phylum: Arthropoda
- Class: Insecta
- Order: Lepidoptera
- Family: Crambidae
- Subfamily: Odontiinae
- Tribe: Odontiini
- Genus: Titanio
- Species: T. magnificalis

Binomial name
- Titanio magnificalis (Christoph, 1877)

Synonyms
- Noctuomorpha magnificalis Christoph, 1877

= Titanio magnificalis =

Species of moth

Titanio magnificalis is a species of moth in the family Crambidae. It is found in Russia and Turkmenistan.
