= Timia beybienkoi =

Scientific classification
- Kingdom: Animalia
- Phylum: Arthropoda
- Class: Insecta
- Order: Diptera
- Family: Ulidiidae
- Genus: Timia
- Species: T. beybienkoi

Binomial name
- Timia beybienkoi Zaitzev, 1982

Species of fly

Timia beybienkoi is a species of ulidiid or picture-winged fly in the genus Timia of the family Ulidiidae. It was described by Tatiana V. Galinskaya in 2011 as part of her review of yellow-bodied species of the genus Timia.
