= Physiphora flavipes =

Scientific classification
- Kingdom: Animalia
- Phylum: Arthropoda
- Clade: Pancrustacea
- Class: Insecta
- Order: Diptera
- Family: Ulidiidae
- Genus: Physiphora
- Species: P. flavipes

Binomial name
- Physiphora flavipes (Karsch, 1888)

Synonyms
- Chrysomyza flavipes Karsch, 1888; Cliochloria senegalensis Enderlein, 1927; Chrysomyza africana Hendel, 1909

Species of fly

Physiphora flavipes is a species of fly in the genus Physiphora of the family Ulidiidae.
