= Titanio mortualis =

Scientific classification
- Domain: Eukaryota
- Kingdom: Animalia
- Phylum: Arthropoda
- Class: Insecta
- Order: Lepidoptera
- Family: Crambidae
- Subfamily: Odontiinae
- Tribe: Odontiini
- Genus: Titanio
- Species: T. mortualis

Binomial name
- Titanio mortualis Caradja, 1916

Species of moth

Titanio mortualis is a moth in the family Crambidae. It was described by Aristide Caradja in 1916. It is found in eastern Turkestan.
