= Titanio hesperialis =

Scientific classification
- Domain: Eukaryota
- Kingdom: Animalia
- Phylum: Arthropoda
- Class: Insecta
- Order: Lepidoptera
- Family: Crambidae
- Subfamily: Odontiinae
- Tribe: Odontiini
- Genus: Titanio
- Species: T. hesperialis

Binomial name
- Titanio hesperialis Hampson, 1900

Species of moth

Titanio hesperialis is a moth in the family Crambidae. It was described by George Hampson in 1900. It is found in Mongolia.
