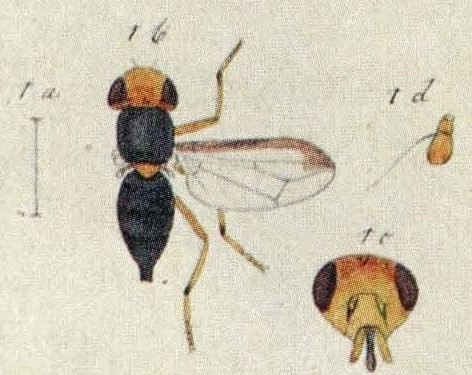
- Johann Wilhelm Meigen's Europäischen Zweiflügeligen Insekten, 1790

Scientific classification
- Kingdom: Animalia
- Phylum: Arthropoda
- Class: Insecta
- Order: Diptera
- Family: Ulidiidae
- Genus: Timia
- Species: T. erythrocephala

Binomial name
- Timia erythrocephala Wiedemann, 1824

= Timia erythrocephala =

Species of fly

Timia erythrocephala is a species of ulidiid or picture-winged fly in the genus Timia of the family Ulidiidae. It is the type species of the genus Timia.
