= Titanio ledereri =

Scientific classification
- Domain: Eukaryota
- Kingdom: Animalia
- Phylum: Arthropoda
- Class: Insecta
- Order: Lepidoptera
- Family: Crambidae
- Subfamily: Odontiinae
- Tribe: Odontiini
- Genus: Titanio
- Species: T. ledereri

Binomial name
- Titanio ledereri (Staudinger, 1870)

Synonyms
- Cleptotypodes ledereri (Staudinger, 1870); Ennychia ledereri Staudinger, 1870

Species of moth

Titanio ledereri is a species of moth in the family Crambidae. It is found in Hungary.
