= Titanio hyrcanella =

Scientific classification
- Domain: Eukaryota
- Kingdom: Animalia
- Phylum: Arthropoda
- Class: Insecta
- Order: Lepidoptera
- Family: Crambidae
- Subfamily: Odontiinae
- Tribe: Odontiini
- Genus: Titanio
- Species: T. hyrcanella

Binomial name
- Titanio hyrcanella Amsel, 1950

Species of moth

Titanio hyrcanella is a moth in the family Crambidae. It was described by Hans Georg Amsel in 1950 and is found in Iran.
