= Titanio basalis =

Scientific classification
- Kingdom: Animalia
- Phylum: Arthropoda
- Class: Insecta
- Order: Lepidoptera
- Family: Crambidae
- Subfamily: Odontiinae
- Tribe: Odontiini
- Genus: Titanio
- Species: T. basalis

Binomial name
- Titanio basalis Caradja, 1928

Species of moth

Titanio basalis is a moth in the family Crambidae. It was described by Aristide Caradja in 1928. It is found in Xinjiang.
