= Physiphora euphorbiana =

Scientific classification
- Kingdom: Animalia
- Phylum: Arthropoda
- Class: Insecta
- Order: Diptera
- Family: Ulidiidae
- Genus: Physiphora
- Species: P. euphorbiana

Binomial name
- Physiphora euphorbiana Krivosheina & Krivosheina, 1997

Species of fly

Physiphora euphorbiana is a species of ulidiid or picture-winged fly in the genus Physiphora of the family Ulidiidae found in western India.
