= Timia asiatica =

Scientific classification
- Kingdom: Animalia
- Phylum: Arthropoda
- Class: Insecta
- Order: Diptera
- Family: Ulidiidae
- Genus: Timia
- Species: T. asiatica

Binomial name
- Timia asiatica Zaitzev, 1982

Species of fly

Timia asiatica is a species of ulidiid or picture-winged fly in the genus Timia of the family Ulidiidae.
