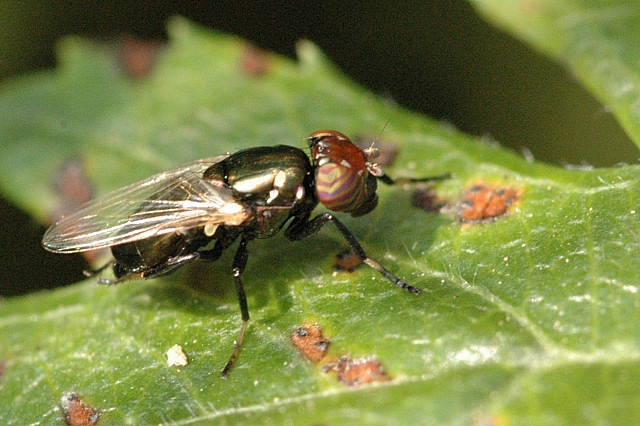

Scientific classification
- Kingdom: Animalia
- Phylum: Arthropoda
- Class: Insecta
- Order: Diptera
- Family: Ulidiidae
- Genus: Physiphora
- Species: P. alceae

Binomial name
- Physiphora alceae (Preyssler, 1791)

= Physiphora alceae =

Species of fly

Physiphora alceae is a species of ulidiid or picture-winged fly in the genus Physiphora of the family Ulidiidae.

== Distribution ==
Physiphora alceae is a cosmopolitan species.

== Lifecycle ==
Larvae of P. alceae feed on decaying plant and animal material and .

== Mating behavior ==
The males of P. alceae were reported to court with an elaborate dance. The courting male may move his fore legs up and down in front of the female. He may also shake his fore legs, turn sidewise to his partner and lift one of his wings, tap on the head or thorax of the partner and probe her with his proboscis (mouthparts).
