= Titanio pulchra =

Scientific classification
- Domain: Eukaryota
- Kingdom: Animalia
- Phylum: Arthropoda
- Class: Insecta
- Order: Lepidoptera
- Family: Crambidae
- Subfamily: Odontiinae
- Tribe: Odontiini
- Genus: Titanio
- Species: T. pulchra

Binomial name
- Titanio pulchra Rebel, 1902

Species of moth

Titanio pulchra is a moth in the family Crambidae. It was described by Rebel in 1902. It is found in Transcaspia.
