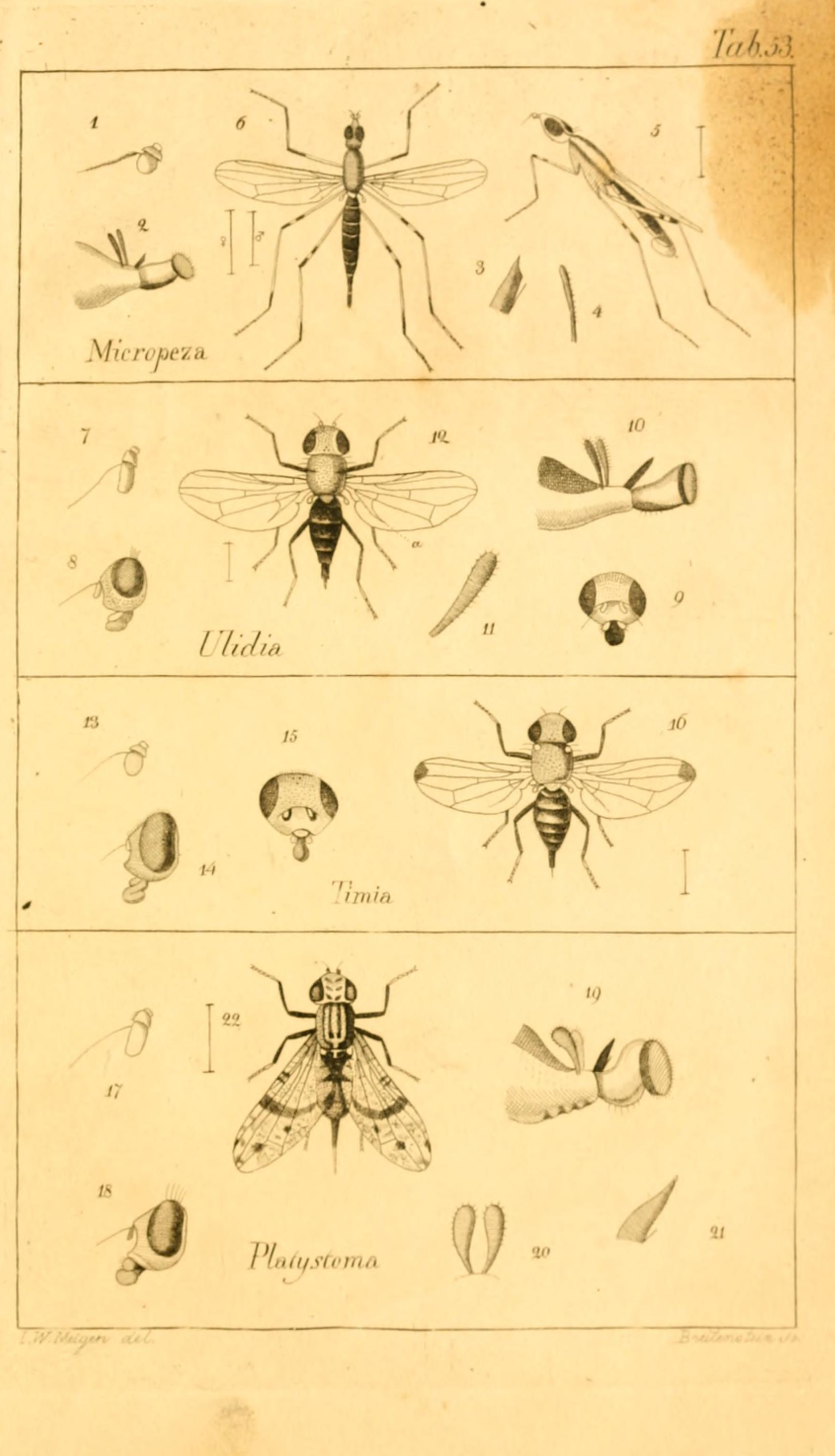
- Ulidia in Meigen Systematische Beschreibung der bekannten europäischen zweiflügeligen Insekten 1826

Scientific classification
- Kingdom: Animalia
- Phylum: Arthropoda
- Class: Insecta
- Order: Diptera
- Family: Ulidiidae
- Subfamily: Ulidiinae
- Tribe: Ulidiini
- Genus: Ulidia; Meigen, 1826

Type species
- Ulidia erythrophthalma Meigen, 1826

= Ulidia =

Genus of flies

Ulidia is a genus of picture-winged flies in the family Ulidiidae.

== Species ==
- Ulidia albidipennis Loew, 1845
- Ulidia apicalis Meigen, 1826
- Ulidia atrata Loew, 1868
- Ulidia atrovirens
- Ulidia bipunctata
- Ulidia clausa
- Ulidia erythrophthalma Meigen, 1826
- Ulidia facialis Hendel, 1931
- Ulidia fulvifrons
- Ulidia gongjuensis Chen, 2009
- Ulidia kandybinae Zaitzev, 1982
- Ulidia megacephala Loew, 1845
- Ulidia melampodia
- Ulidia metope Kameneva, 2010
- Ulidia nigricubitalis
- Ulidia nigripennis Loew, 1845
- Ulidia nitens
- Ulidia nitida
- Ulidia omani Steyskal, 1970
- Ulidia parallela Loew, 1845
- Ulidia rubida
- Ulidia ruficeps Becker, 1913
- Ulidia salonikiensis Hennig, 1940
- Ulidia semiopaca Loew, 1845
- Ulidia smaragdina
- Ulidia splendida
- Ulidia wadicola Steyskal, 1968
- Ulidia xizangensis Chen, 2009
