= Leucoptera heringiella =

Scientific classification
- Kingdom: Animalia
- Phylum: Arthropoda
- Class: Insecta
- Order: Lepidoptera
- Family: Lyonetiidae
- Genus: Leucoptera
- Species: L. heringiella

Binomial name
- Leucoptera heringiella Toll, 1938

Species of moth

Leucoptera heringiella is a moth in the family Lyonetiidae that is found from Poland to North Macedonia, Bulgaria and in southern Russia.

The larvae feed on Chamaecytisus austriacus, Chamaecytisus ratisbonensis, Chamaecytisus supinus and Lembotropis nigricans. They mine the leaves of their host plant.
