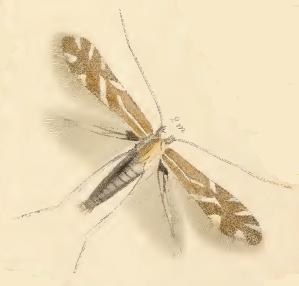

Scientific classification
- Domain: Eukaryota
- Kingdom: Animalia
- Phylum: Arthropoda
- Class: Insecta
- Order: Lepidoptera
- Family: Gracillariidae
- Genus: Phyllonorycter
- Species: P. staintoniella

Binomial name
- Phyllonorycter staintoniella (Nicelli, 1853)

Synonyms
- Lithocolletis staintoniella Nicelli, 1853; Lithocolletis desertella Gregor & Povolny, 1949; Lithocolletis tinctoriella Le Marchand, 1926; Phyllonorycter staintonella

= Phyllonorycter staintoniella =

Species of moth

Phyllonorycter staintoniella is a moth of the family Gracillariidae. It is found from Sweden to the Pyrenees, Sardinia, Italy and Bulgaria and from Great Britain to Poland and Romania.

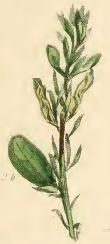
Sprig of Genista pilosa, with two mined leaves

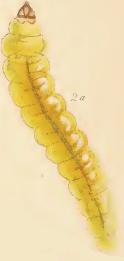
Larva

The wingspan is 4.5–7 mm.

The larvae feed on Chamaecytisus austriacus, Chamaecytisus ratisbonensis, Cytisus procumbens, Cytisus scoparius, Genista baetica, Genista pilosa, Genista scorpius, Genista tinctoria, Laburnum anagyroides and Lembotropis nigricans. They mine the leaves of their host plant.
