= Coleophora supinella =

Scientific classification
- Kingdom: Animalia
- Phylum: Arthropoda
- Class: Insecta
- Order: Lepidoptera
- Family: Coleophoridae
- Genus: Coleophora
- Species: C. supinella

Binomial name
- Coleophora supinella Ortner, 1949

Species of moth

Coleophora supinella is a moth of the family Coleophoridae. It is found from Germany, Spain, Italy, Belgium, France, Czech Republic, Slovakia, and Austria. It is also known from Bulgaria.

The wingspan is 12.5-15.5 mm.

The larvae feed on Chamaecytisus supinus and Chamaecytisus austriacus. They feed on the generative organs of their host plant. They create a case.
