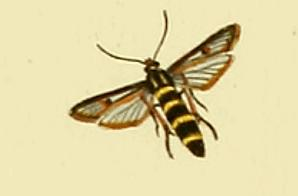

Scientific classification
- Kingdom: Animalia
- Phylum: Arthropoda
- Clade: Pancrustacea
- Class: Insecta
- Order: Lepidoptera
- Family: Sesiidae
- Genus: Bembecia
- Species: B. megillaeformis

Binomial name
- Bembecia megillaeformis (Hübner, 1813)

Synonyms
- Sphinx megillaeformis Hübner, [1813]; Sesia megilliformis; Dypsosphecia masellaeformis Ragusa, 1923

= Bembecia megillaeformis =

Species of moth

Bembecia megillaeformis is a moth of the family Sesiidae. It is found in central and south-eastern Europe, east to Turkey, Uralsk, the Crimea and the Black Sea.

The wingspan is 18–22 millimetres (0.71–0.87 in). Adults are on wing from June to August.

The larvae feed on Genista tinctoria, Genista ratisbonensis, Cytisus hirsutus, Colutea arborescens, Chamaecytisus, Astragalus glycyphyllos and Corothamus procumbens.

== Subspecies ==
- Bembecia megillaeformis megillaeformis (Germany, Slovakia, Austria, Hungary, Romania, Croatia, Italy, southern Russia, Uralsk, Crimea, Black Sea)
- Bembecia megillaeformis luqueti Špatenka, 1992 (France: Brittany, Loire Valley)
