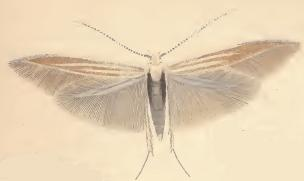

Scientific classification
- Kingdom: Animalia
- Phylum: Arthropoda
- Clade: Pancrustacea
- Class: Insecta
- Order: Lepidoptera
- Family: Coleophoridae
- Genus: Coleophora
- Species: C. trifariella

Binomial name
- Coleophora trifariella Zeller, 1849

= Coleophora trifariella =

Species of moth

Coleophora trifariella is a moth of the family Coleophoridae. It is found from Germany and Poland to the Iberian Peninsula and Italy and from France to Romania. There is a disjunct population in Belarus. It is also known from Turkey.

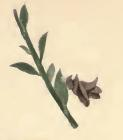
Sprig of broom with attached larva-case

Larva

The larvae feed on Chamaecytisus supinus, Coronilla, Cytisus scoparius, Genista pilosa, Genista tinctoria, Laburnum anagyroides, Lembotropis nigricans and Spartium junceum. Larvae can be found up to June.
