= Trifurcula chamaecytisi =

Scientific classification
- Kingdom: Animalia
- Phylum: Arthropoda
- Class: Insecta
- Order: Lepidoptera
- Family: Nepticulidae
- Genus: Trifurcula
- Species: T. chamaecytisi

Binomial name
- Trifurcula chamaecytisi Z. & A. Laštuvka, 1994

Species of moth

Trifurcula chamaecytisi is a moth of the family Nepticulidae. It was described by Zdenek Laštuvka and Ales Laštuvka in 1994. It is known from Austria, the Czech Republic, Slovenia, Hungary and Russia.

The larvae feed on Chamaecytisus species, including C. austriacus.
