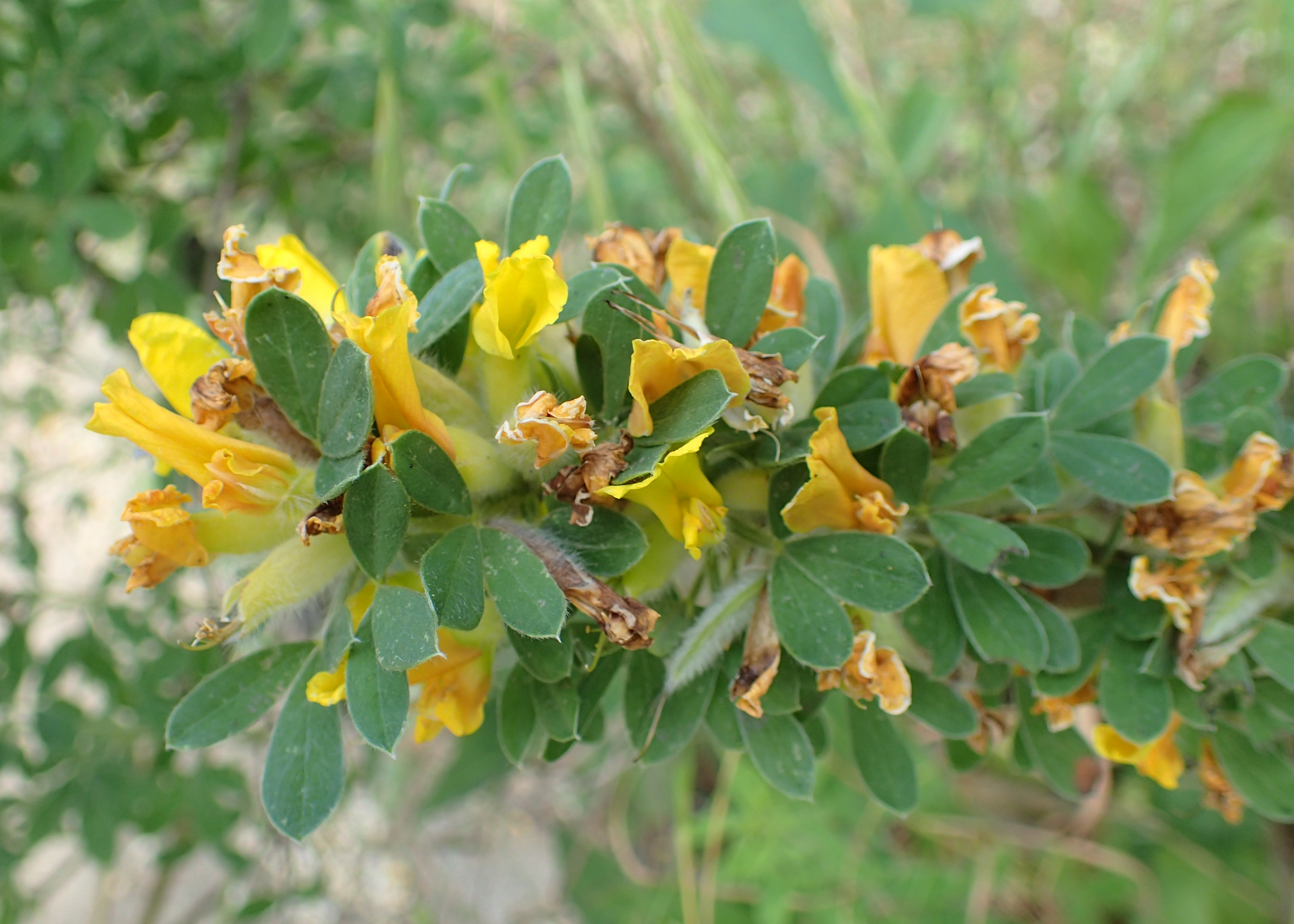
- In the Berlin Botanical Garden and Botanical Museum

Scientific classification
- Kingdom: Plantae
- Clade: Tracheophytes
- Clade: Angiosperms
- Clade: Eudicots
- Clade: Rosids
- Order: Fabales
- Family: Fabaceae
- Subfamily: Faboideae
- Genus: Chamaecytisus
- Species: C. triflorus

Binomial name
- Chamaecytisus triflorus (Lam.) Skalická

Synonyms
- Of the species: Cytisus triflorus Lam.; Genista triflora (Lam.) Rouy; Laburnum triflorum (Lam.) J.Presl; Lembotropis triflora (Lam.) C.Presl; Spartocytisus triflorus (Lam.) Webb & Berthel.; Of subspecies pumilus: Chamaecytisus hirsutus subsp. pumilus (De Not.) Kerguélen; Chamaecytisus pumilus (De Not.) Rothm.; Cytisus hirsutus subsp. pumilus (De Not.) Briq.; Cytisus hirsutus var. pumilus (De Not.) Arcang.; Cytisus pumilus De Not.; Of subspecies triflorus: List: Chamaecytisus colchicus (Albov) Port.; Chamaecytisus hirsutissimus (K.Koch) Czerep.; Chamaecytisus hirsutus var. garganicus (Bertol.) Fen., without basionym ref.; Chamaecytisus hirsutus subsp. hirsutissimus (K.Koch) Ponert; Chamaecytisus hirsutus var. hirsutissimus (K.Koch) Kuzmanov; Chamaecytisus hirsutus subsp. leucotrichus (Schur) Ponert; Chamaecytisus leucotrichus (Schur) Czerep.; Chamaecytisus triflorus var. albanicus (Degen & Dörfl.) Micevski; Chamaecytisus triflorus subsp. leucotrichus (Schur) Holub; Cytisus ciliatus var. ponticus (Nyman) Stoj. & Stef.; Cytisus colchicus Albov; Cytisus elongatus Friv. ex Nyman, not validly publ.; Cytisus falcatus subsp. albanicus Degen & Dörfl.; Cytisus haynaldii Simonk.; Cytisus haynaldii var. perhirsutus Simonk.; Cytisus hirsutissimus K.Koch; Cytisus hirsutus Bubani, nom. illeg.; Cytisus hirsutus subsp. elongatus Briq.; Cytisus hirsutus var. garganicus Bertol.; Cytisus hirsutus var. haynaldii (Simonk.) Briq.; Cytisus hirsutus subsp. hirsutissimus (K.Koch) Bornm.; Cytisus hirsutus var. hirsutissimus (K.Koch) Boiss.; Cytisus hirsutus subsp. leucotrichus (Schur) Asch. & Graebn., not validly publ.; Cytisus hirsutus var. leucotrichus (Schur) Fiori; Cytisus hirsutus var. perhirsutus (Simonk.) Briq.; Cytisus hirsutus subsp. ponticus Nyman; Cytisus hirsutus var. ponticus (Nyman) Stoj. & Stef.; Cytisus lamarckii Ten.; Cytisus lamarckii var. lucanus Ten.; Cytisus lamarckii var. stabianus Ten.; Cytisus lasiosemius var. hirsutissimus (K.Koch) Hausskn. & Bornm.; Cytisus leucotrichus Schur; Cytisus leucotrichus var. hirsutissimus (K.Koch) Stoj. & Stef., nom. superfl.; Cytisus ponticus Griseb., nom. illeg.; Cytisus repens Wolfner; Cytisus tournefortianus Loisel.; Cytisus virgatus Vest, nom. illeg.; Cytisus virgulatus Rchb.

= Chamaecytisus triflorus =

Species of legume

Chamaecytisus triflorus is a shrubby plant in the family Fabaceae native from Europe to the Caucasus. It was first described in 1786 as Cytisus triflorus. Along with its two recognized subspecies, C. triflorus subsp. pumilus and C. triflorus subsp. triflorus, it has many synonyms including subspecies and varieties of the separate species Chamaecytisus hirsutus.

== Taxonomy ==
Chamaecytisus triflorus was first described by Jean-Baptiste Lamarck in 1786 as Cytisus triflorus. It was transferred to the genus Chamaecytisus in 1986.

=== Subspecies ===
As of August 2025, Plants of the World Online accepted two subspecies:

- Chamaecytisus triflorus subsp. pumilus (De Not.) Greuter & Burdet – France, Italy
- Chamaecytisus triflorus subsp. triflorus – throughout the range of the species

== Distribution and habitat ==
Chamaecytisus triflorus is native to Europe (Albania, Austria, Bulgaria, Czechia-Slovakia, France, Greece, Hungary, Italy, the northwestern Balkan Peninsula, Romania, Switzerland, and Ukraine), European Turkey, and the North Caucasus.
