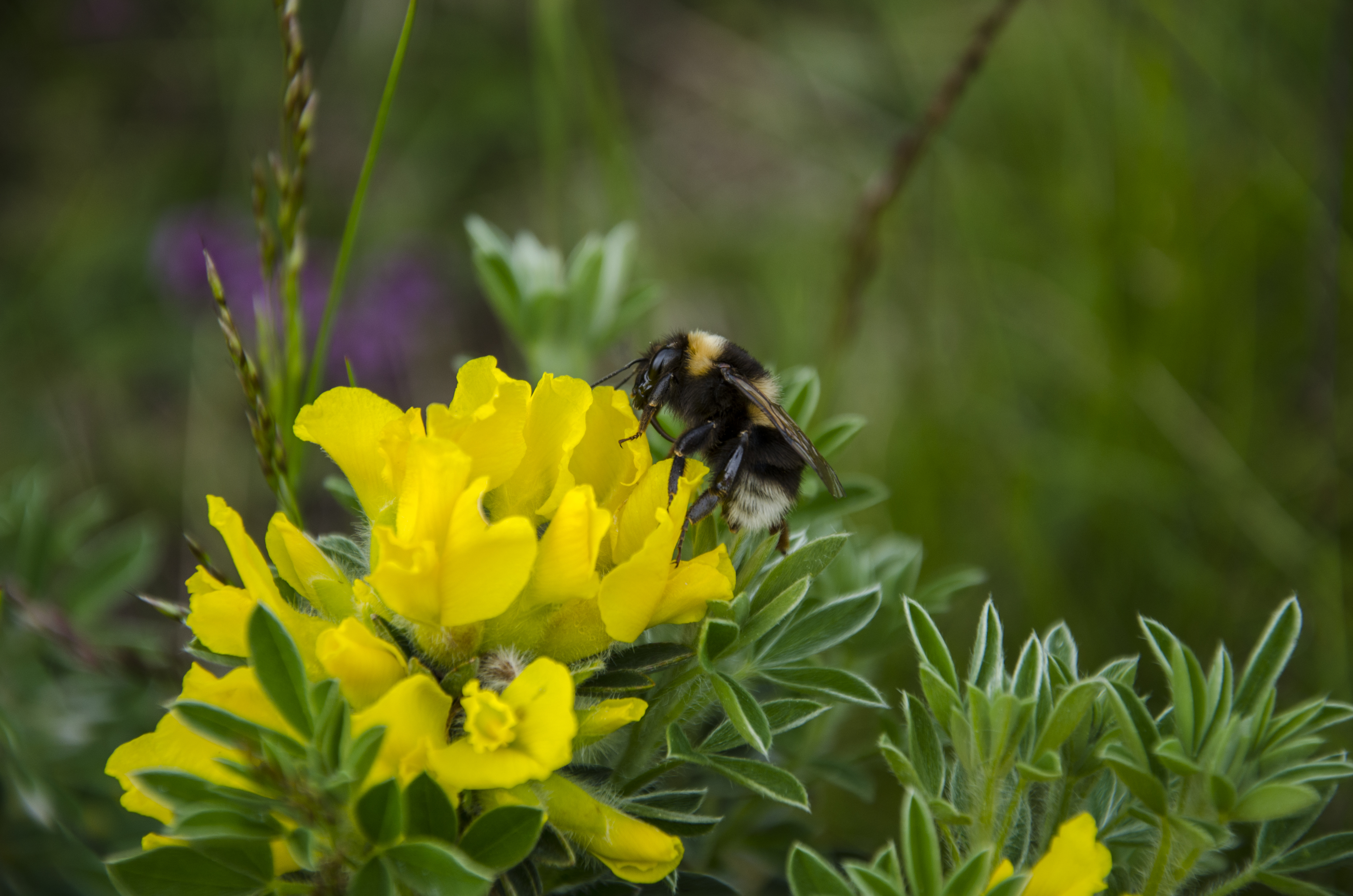

Scientific classification
- Kingdom: Plantae
- Clade: Tracheophytes
- Clade: Angiosperms
- Clade: Eudicots
- Clade: Rosids
- Order: Fabales
- Family: Fabaceae
- Subfamily: Faboideae
- Genus: Chamaecytisus
- Species: C. frivaldszkyanus

Binomial name
- Chamaecytisus frivaldszkyanus (Degen) Kuzmanov ex Greuter, Burdet & G.Long

Synonyms
- Cytisus frivaldszkyanus Degen; Chamaecytisus albus subsp. frivaldszkyanus (Degen) Soó

= Chamaecytisus frivaldszkyanus =

Species of flowering plant

Chamaecytisus frivaldszkyanus is a species of flowering plant in the family Fabaceae. The species is endemic to Bulgaria, where it is found in several locations in the Danubian Plain, the Balkan Mountains, the Upper Thracian Plain and the Rhodope Mountains.

== Taxonomy ==
The species was first described by Árpád von Degen in 1893 as Cytisus frivaldszkyanus. It was later transferred to the genus Chamaecytisus by Rezső Soó in 1972 as a subspecies of Chamaecytisus albus.
