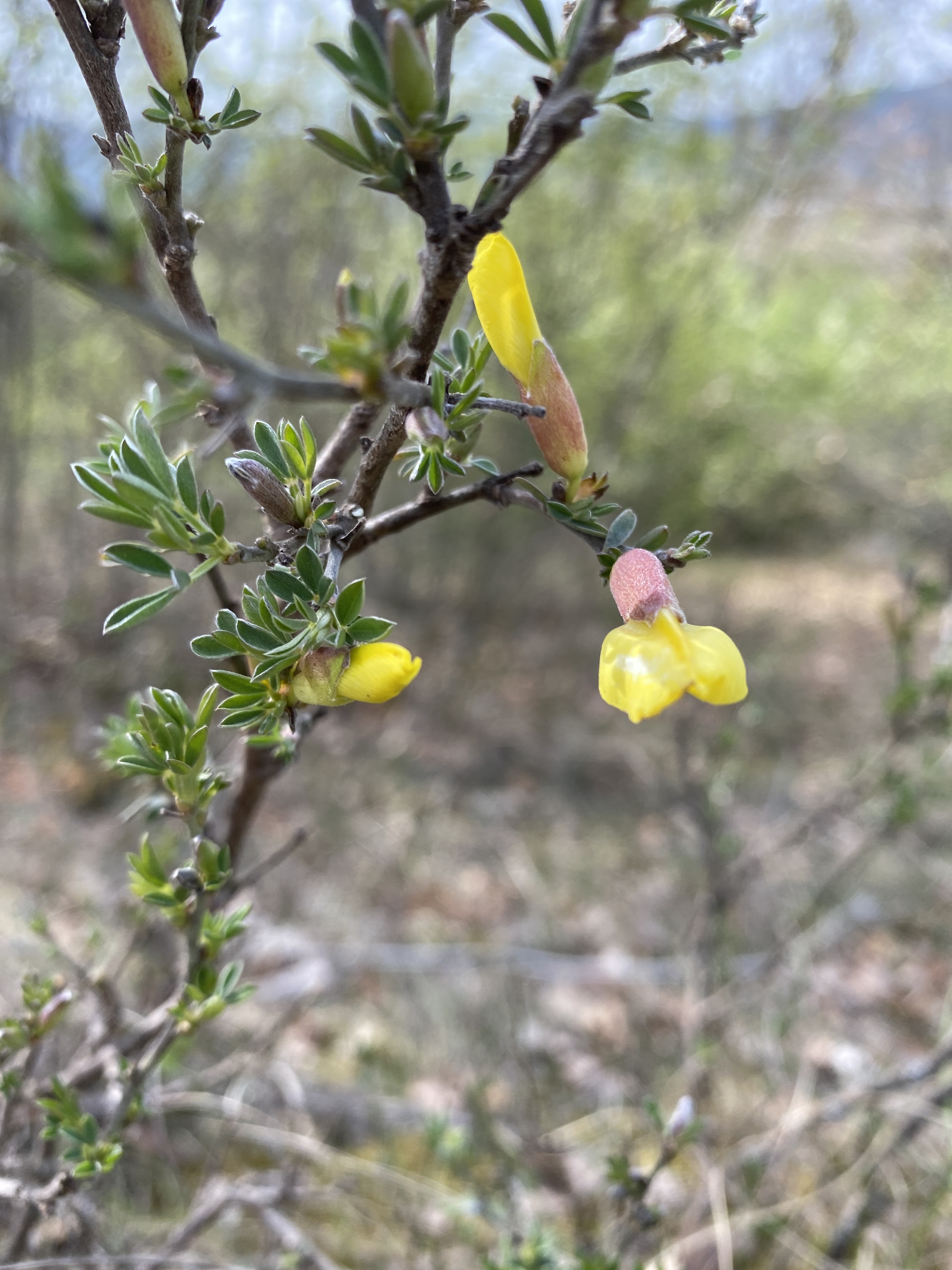

Conservation status
- Least Concern (IUCN 3.1)

Scientific classification
- Kingdom: Plantae
- Clade: Tracheophytes
- Clade: Angiosperms
- Clade: Eudicots
- Clade: Rosids
- Order: Fabales
- Family: Fabaceae
- Subfamily: Faboideae
- Genus: Chamaecytisus
- Species: C. spinescens

Binomial name
- Chamaecytisus spinescens Rothm.

Synonyms
- Cytisus spinescens C.Presl

= Chamaecytisus spinescens =

Species of flowering plant

Chamaecytisus spinescens, commonly called spiny broom, is a species of flowering plant in the family Fabaceae. It is native to Southern Europe with the exclusion of Spain and Portugal, ranging from Central and South Italy (exclusively the mainland) to the West and South Balkan Peninsula along with the island of Crete.

== Taxonomy ==
The species was first described (illegitimately) by Carl Borivoj Presl in 1826 as Cytisus spinescens and was transferred to the genus Chamaecytisus by Werner Rothmaler in 1944 under its current binomial name.

== Subtaxa ==
The following subspecies are accepted:

• Chamaecytisus spinescens subsp. spinescens

• Chamaecytisus spinescens subsp. creticus (Boiss. & Heldr.) K.I.Chr.
