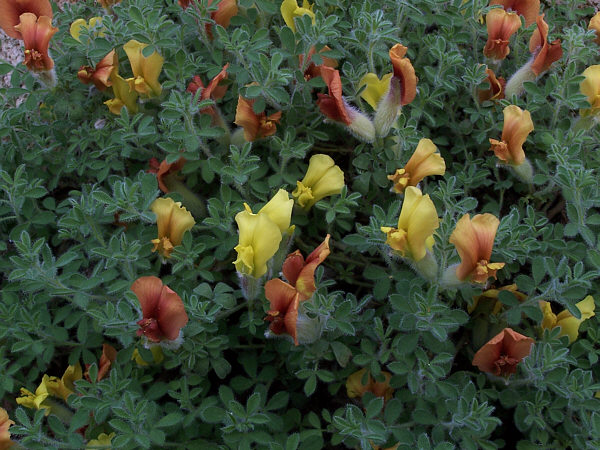

Scientific classification
- Kingdom: Plantae
- Clade: Tracheophytes
- Clade: Angiosperms
- Clade: Eudicots
- Clade: Rosids
- Order: Fabales
- Family: Fabaceae
- Subfamily: Faboideae
- Genus: Chamaecytisus
- Species: C. hirsutus
- Subspecies: C. h. subsp. polytrichus

Trinomial name
- Chamaecytisus hirsutus subsp. polytrichus (M.Bieb.) Ponert

Synonyms
- List: Chamaecytisus polytrichus (M.Bieb.) Rothm.; Chamaecytisus polytrichus var. demissus (Boiss.) Kuzmanov; Cytisus demissus Boiss.; Cytisus hirsutus var. demissus (Boiss.) Halácsy; Cytisus hirsutus subsp. polytrichus (M.Bieb.) Hayek; Cytisus hirsutus var. polytrichus (M.Bieb.) Briq.; Cytisus leucotrichus var. polytrichus (M.Bieb.) Stoj. & Stef.; Cytisus polytrichus M.Bieb.; Cytisus polytrichus var. subglabratus Val.N.Tikhom. & Sennikov; Genista hirta Rouy

= Chamaecytisus hirsutus subsp. polytrichus =

Species of flowering plant

Chamaecytisus hirsutus subsp. polytrichus, syn. Chamaecytisus polytrichus, is a subspecies of flowering plant in the family Fabaceae. It is native to Europe, ranging from France, Italy to the Balkans with the exception of Albania and East Thrace. It can also be found in Crimea and North Caucasus.
