= Chamaecytisus drepanolobus =

Scientific classification
- Kingdom: Plantae
- Clade: Tracheophytes
- Clade: Angiosperms
- Clade: Eudicots
- Clade: Rosids
- Order: Fabales
- Family: Fabaceae
- Subfamily: Faboideae
- Genus: Chamaecytisus
- Species: C. drepanolobus

Binomial name
- Chamaecytisus drepanolobus (Boiss.) Rothm.

Synonyms
- Cytisus drepanolobus Boiss.

Species of flowering plant

Chamaecytisus drepanolobus is a species of flowering plant in the family Fabaceae. The species is native to Asia, occurring in countries such as Turkey, Lebanon and Syria.

== Taxonomy ==
The species was first described by Pierre Edmond Boissier in 1849 as Cytisus drepanolobus and was transferred to the genus Chamaecytisus by Werner Rothmaler in 1944 under its current binomial name.
