= Chamaecytisus cassius =

Scientific classification
- Kingdom: Plantae
- Clade: Tracheophytes
- Clade: Angiosperms
- Clade: Eudicots
- Clade: Rosids
- Order: Fabales
- Family: Fabaceae
- Subfamily: Faboideae
- Genus: Chamaecytisus
- Species: C. cassius

Binomial name
- Chamaecytisus cassius (Boiss.) Rothm

Synonyms
- Cytisus cassius Boiss.

Species of flowering plant

Chamaecytisus cassius is a species of flowering plant in the family Fabaceae. It is native to South Turkey and the territories of Lebanon and Syria.

== Description ==
Shrub, typically 6–10 feet tall, leaves trifoliate. Seed pods begin appearing in June.

== Taxonomy ==
Chamaecytisus cassius was first described by Pierre Edmond Boissier in 1849 as Cytisus cassius, but has since been transferred to the genus Chamaecytisus by German botanist Werner Rothmaler in 1944 and published under its current binomial name.
