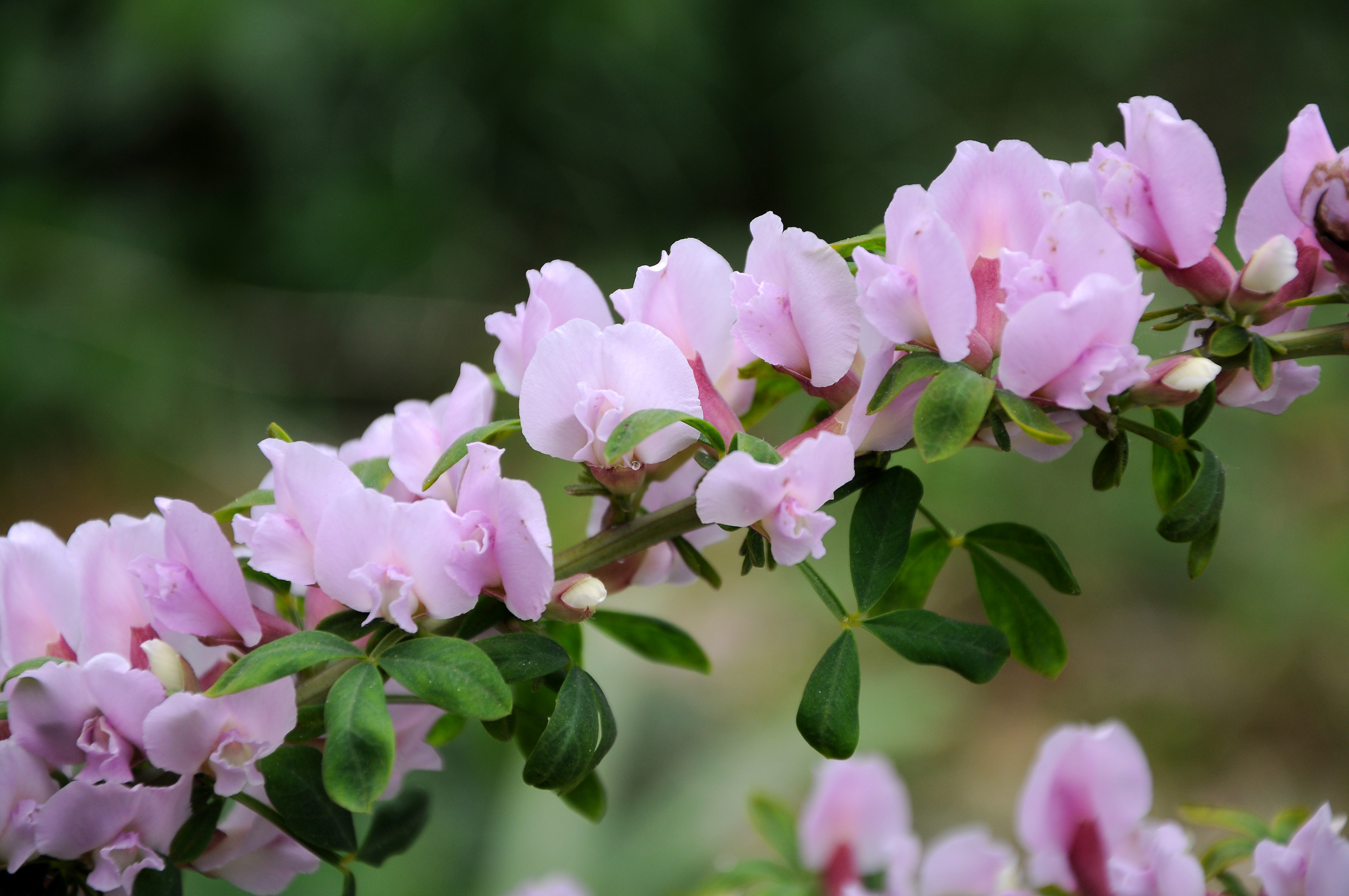
- Branch with flowers
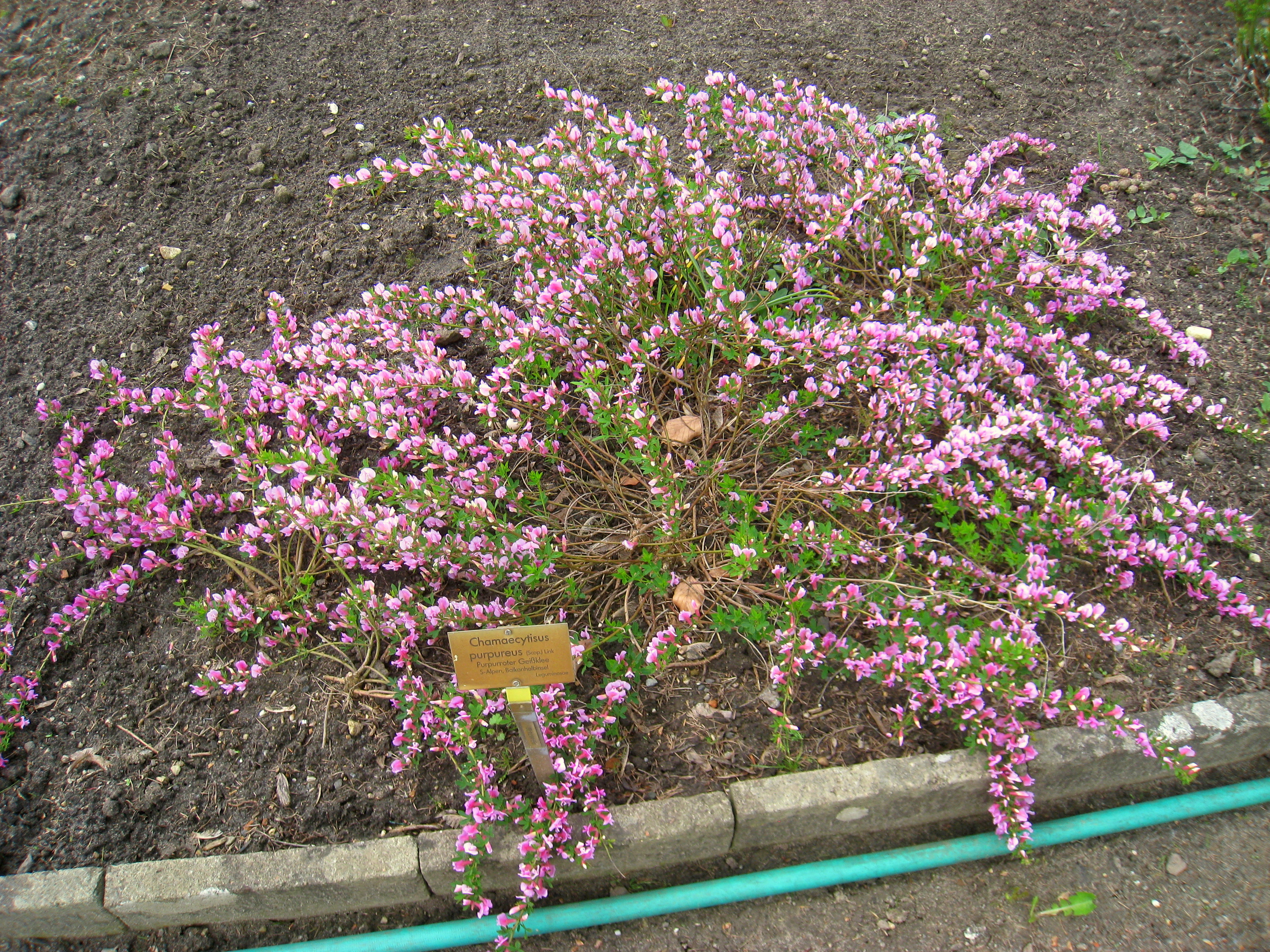
- At the Berlin Botanical Garden and Botanical Museum

Scientific classification
- Kingdom: Plantae
- Clade: Tracheophytes
- Clade: Angiosperms
- Clade: Eudicots
- Clade: Rosids
- Order: Fabales
- Family: Fabaceae
- Subfamily: Faboideae
- Genus: Chamaecytisus
- Species: C. purpureus

Binomial name
- Chamaecytisus purpureus (Scop.) Link

Synonyms
- Chamaecytisus mitrushii F.K.Mey.; Cytisus purpureus Scop.; Genista purpurea (Scop.) Scheele; Laburnum purpureum (Scop.) Drapiez; Viborgia purpurea (Scop.) Moench

= Chamaecytisus purpureus =

Species of flowering plant

Chamaecytisus purpureus (syn. Cytisus purpureus), the purple broom, is a species of flowering plant in the family Fabaceae. It is native to the southern and southeastern Alps and the Dinaric Alps down to northern Albania, and it has been introduced to various locales in Europe and the Caucasus. It is available from commercial suppliers.
