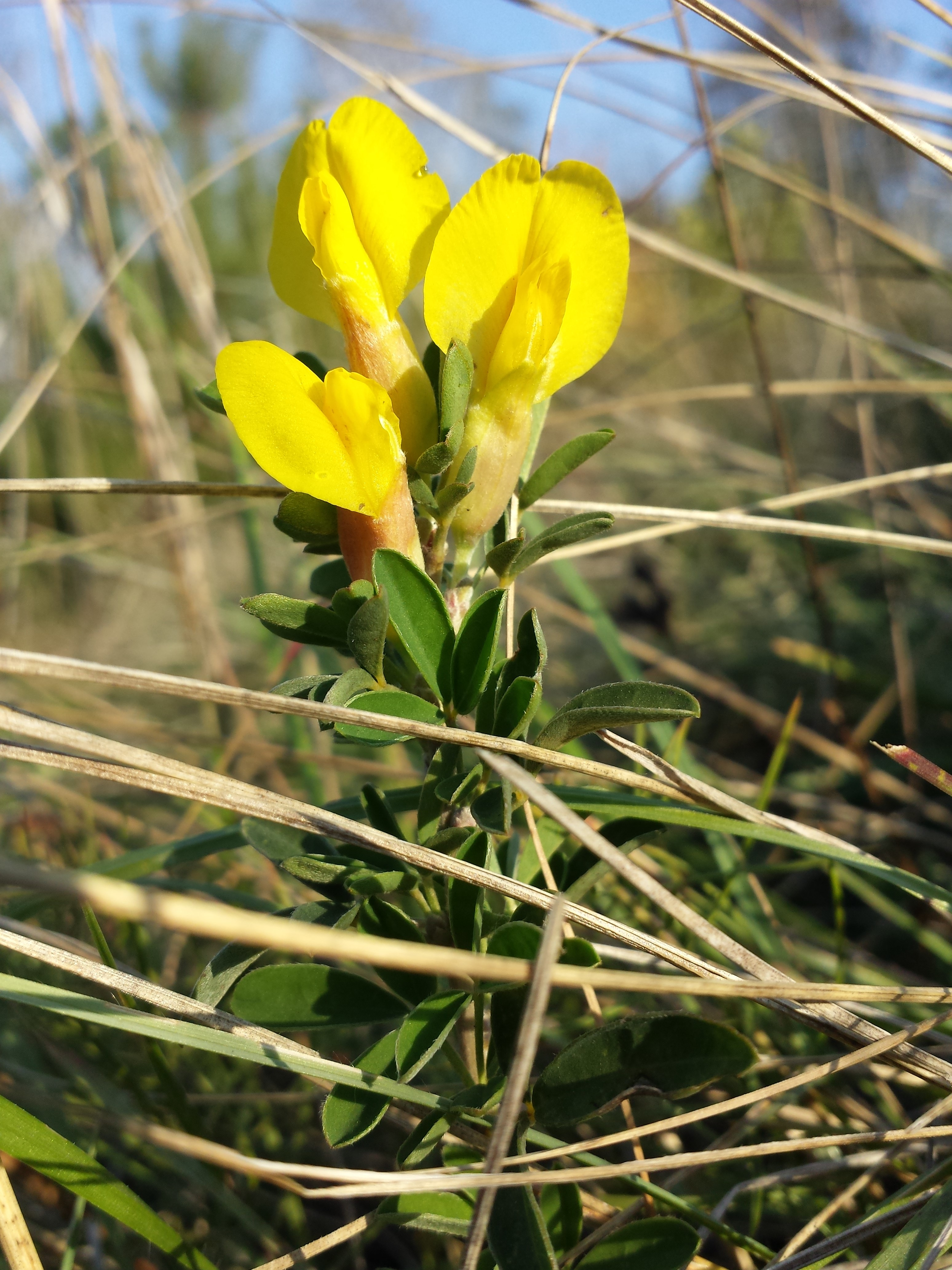

Scientific classification
- Kingdom: Plantae
- Clade: Tracheophytes
- Clade: Angiosperms
- Clade: Eudicots
- Clade: Rosids
- Order: Fabales
- Family: Fabaceae
- Subfamily: Faboideae
- Genus: Chamaecytisus
- Species: C. ratisbonensis

Binomial name
- Chamaecytisus ratisbonensis (Schaeff.) Rothm.

= Chamaecytisus ratisbonensis =

Species of flowering plant

Chamaecytisus ratisbonensis, also called the Regensburg broom, is a species of flowering plant in the family Fabaceae. It is native to territories ranging from Central Europe to the Balkan Peninsula to Ukraine. It has been introduced into the Baltic States.

== Description ==
A perennial that typically grows up to 30 centimeters tall. Blooms from April to June.

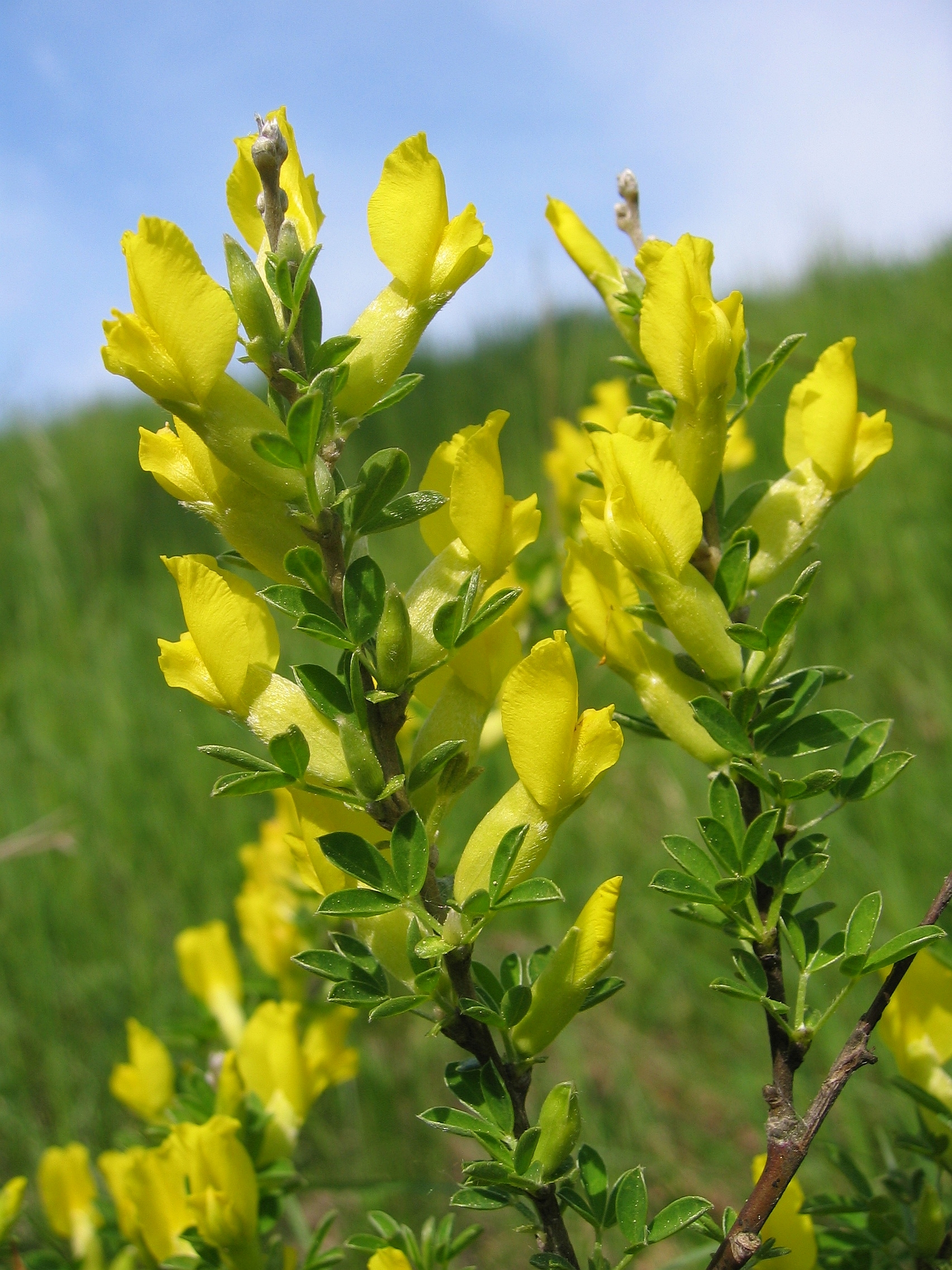
Flowers

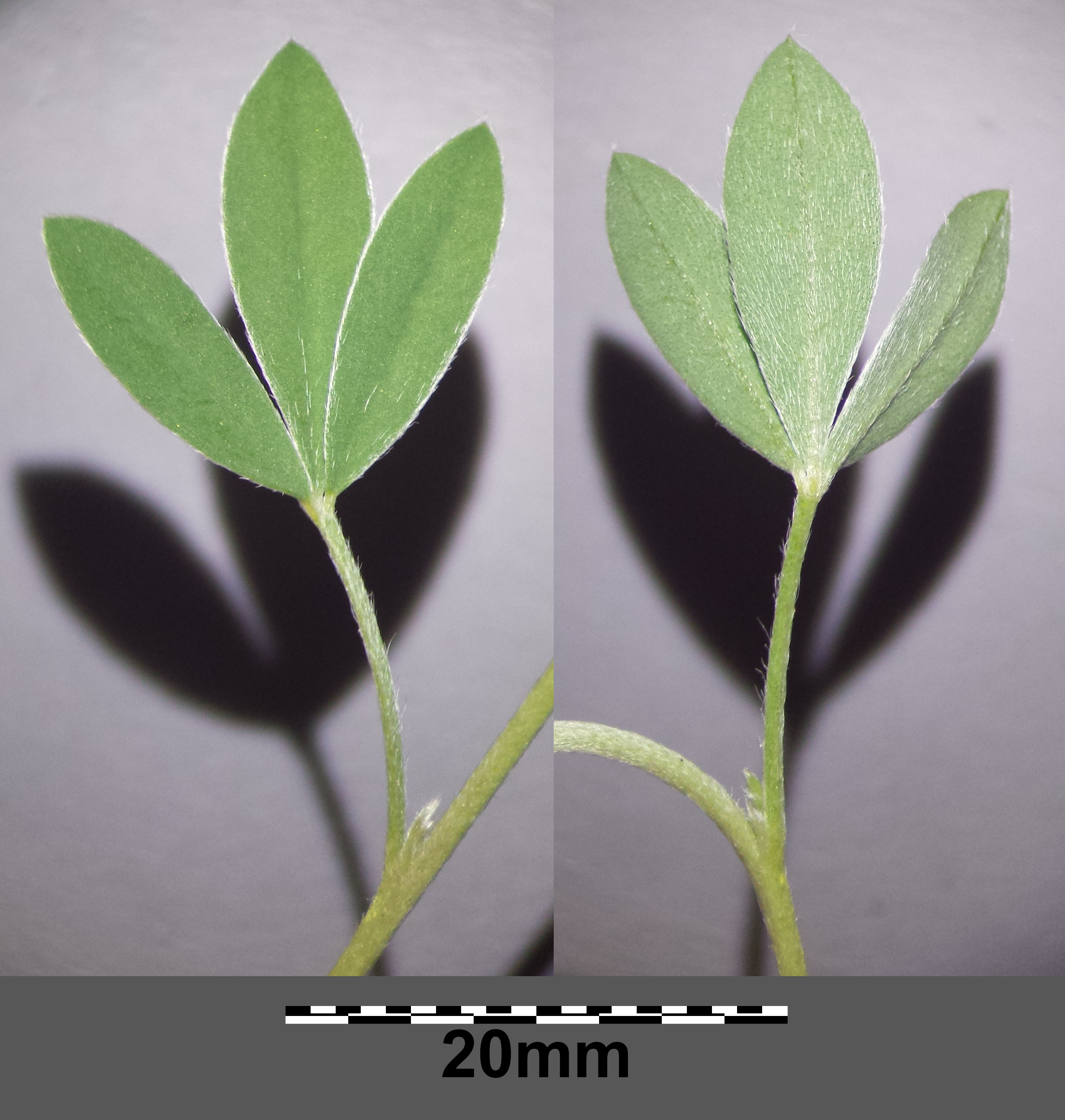
Leaves

== Taxonomy ==
The species was first described by Jacob Christian Schäffer in 1760 as Cytisus ratisbonensis, then described a subspecies of Cytisus hirsutus (Chamaecytisus hirsutus) by John Isaac Briquet in 1894 until it was finally transferred to the genus Chamaecytisus by Werner Rothmaler in 1944, giving it its current binomial name.

=== Etymology ===
The Latin specific epithet ratisbonensis means "from Regensburg", which in Latin is written Ratisbona, hinting at a connection of the plant to the nearby area of the city.
