= Chamaecytisus proteus =

Scientific classification
- Kingdom: Plantae
- Clade: Tracheophytes
- Clade: Angiosperms
- Clade: Eudicots
- Clade: Rosids
- Order: Fabales
- Family: Fabaceae
- Subfamily: Faboideae
- Genus: Chamaecytisus
- Species: C. proteus

Binomial name
- Chamaecytisus proteus (Zumagl.) Holub

Synonyms
- Chamaecytisus hirsutus subsp. proteus (Zumagl.) Fen.

Species of flowering plant

Chamaecytisus proteus, formerly a subspecies of Chamaecytisus hirsutus, is a species of flowering plant in the family Fabaceae. Its native range is northwest Italy.
