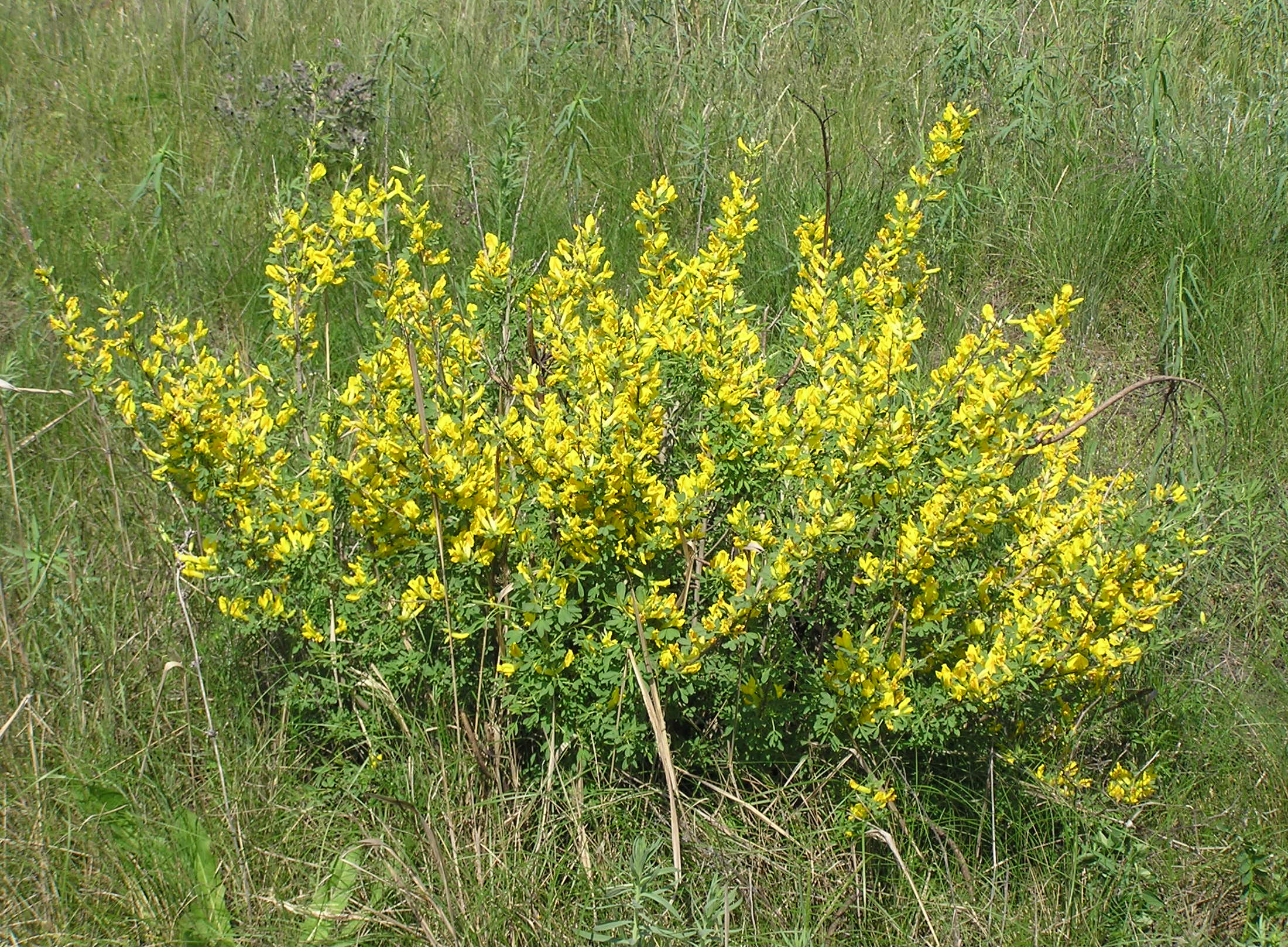

Scientific classification
- Kingdom: Plantae
- Clade: Tracheophytes
- Clade: Angiosperms
- Clade: Eudicots
- Clade: Rosids
- Order: Fabales
- Family: Fabaceae
- Subfamily: Faboideae
- Genus: Chamaecytisus
- Species: C. ruthenicus

Binomial name
- Chamaecytisus ruthenicus (Fisch. ex Woł.) Klásk.

Synonyms
- Cytisus ruthenicus Fisch. ex Woł.

= Chamaecytisus ruthenicus =

Species of plant

Chamaecytisus ruthenicus, also called Ruthenian broom, is a species of flowering plant in the family Fabaceae. It is native to East Poland, Ukraine, Belarus, the Caucasus region, Kazakhstan and Russia up until West Siberia. It has been introduced to two northern regions of Russia, namely North European Russia and Northwest European Russia.

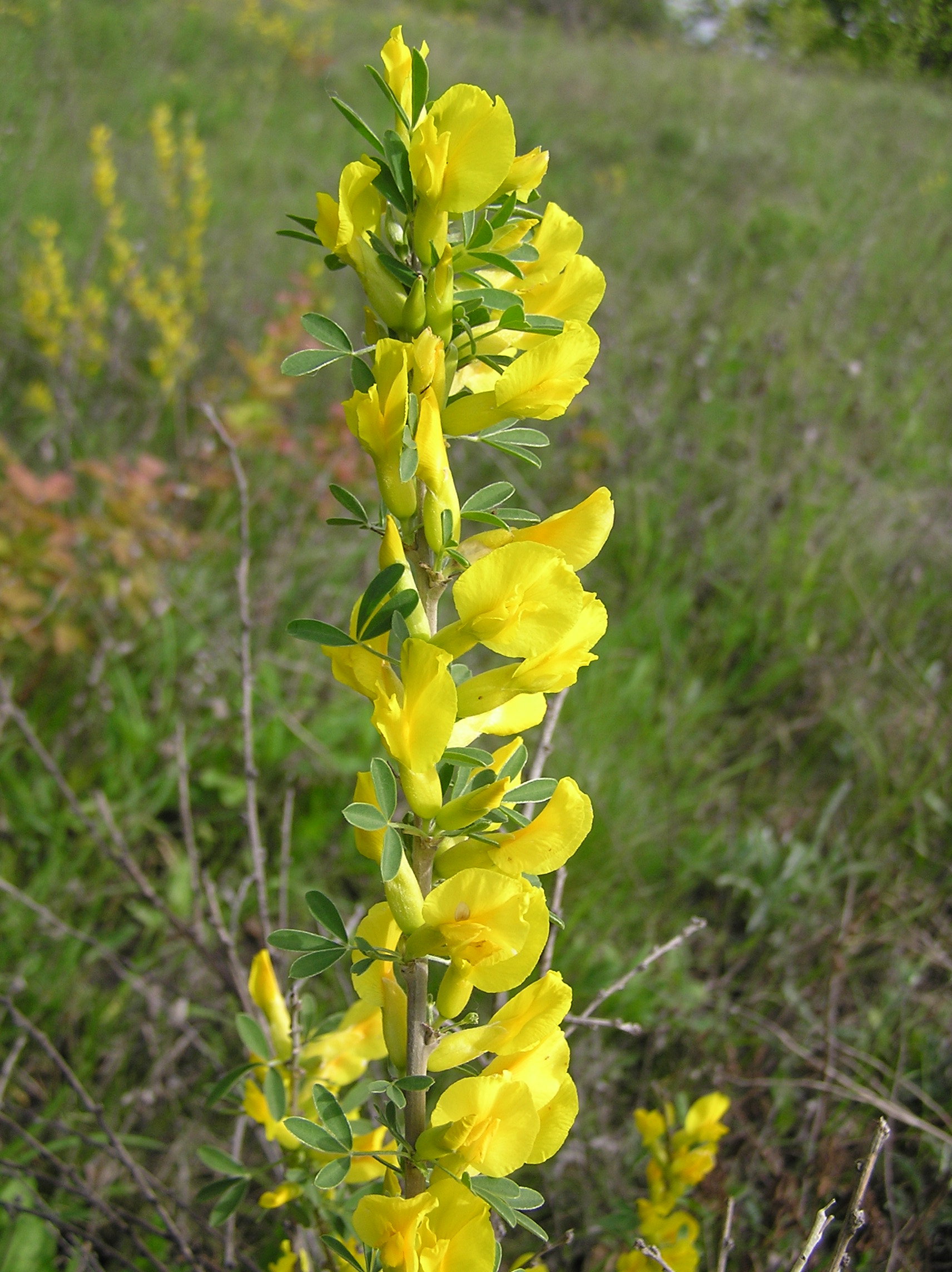
Flowers

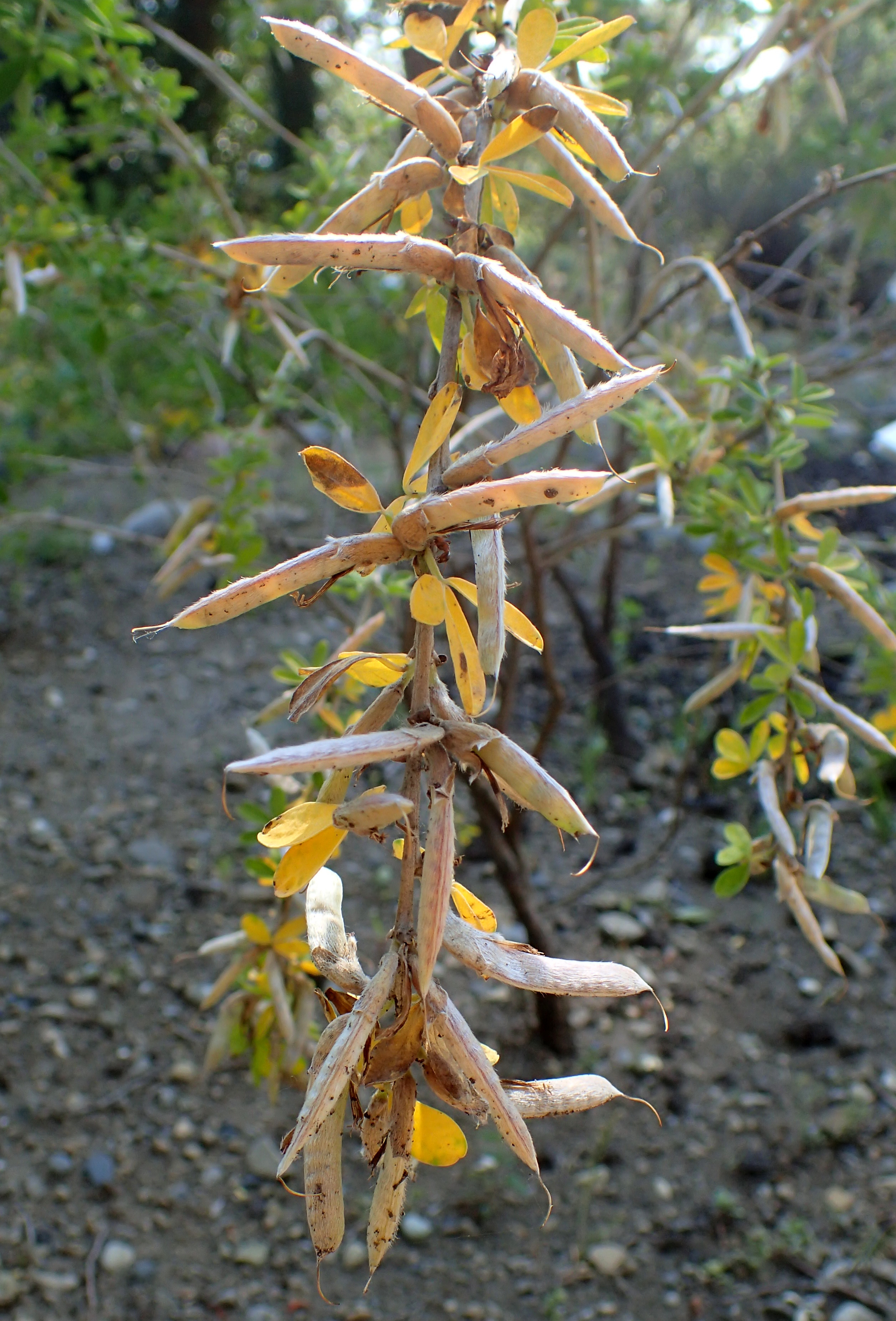
Seed pods
