= Chamaecytisus wulfii =

Scientific classification
- Kingdom: Plantae
- Clade: Tracheophytes
- Clade: Angiosperms
- Clade: Eudicots
- Clade: Rosids
- Order: Fabales
- Family: Fabaceae
- Subfamily: Faboideae
- Genus: Chamaecytisus
- Species: C. wulfii

Binomial name
- Chamaecytisus wulfii (Krecz.) Klásk.

Synonyms
- Cytisus wulfii Krecz.

Species of flowering plant

The Chamaecytisus wulfii

Chamaecytisus wulfii is a species of flowering plant in the family Fabaceae. It is native to the Crimean Peninsula in Ukraine and the North Caucasus subregion. It has a doubtful degree of presence in Turkey.

== Taxonomy ==
The species was first described in 1940 by Vitali Iwanowicz Kreczetowicz as Cytisus wulfii, but has since been transferred to the genus Chamaecytisus in 1958 by Anna Klásková (later Skalická) under its current binomial name.
