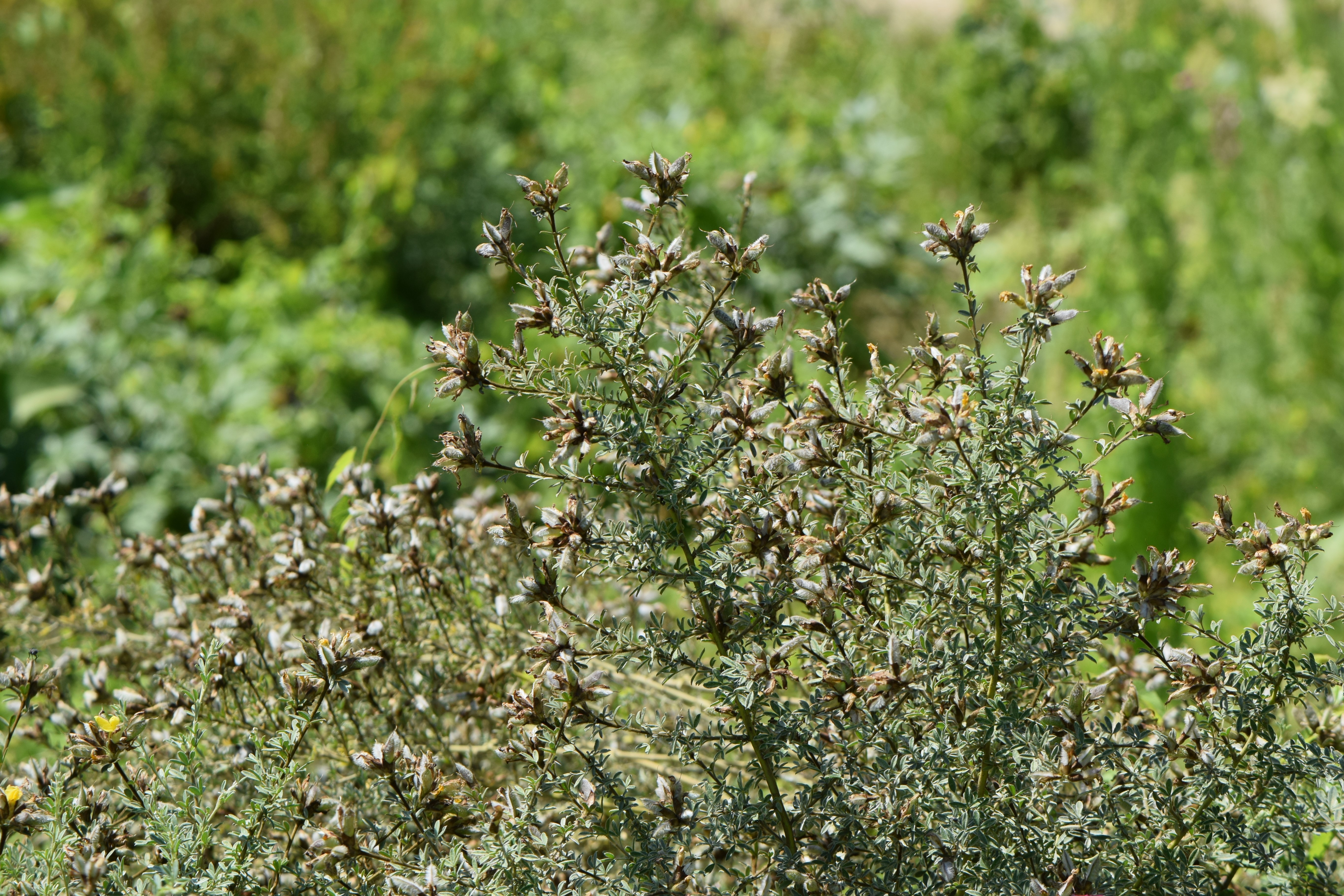

Scientific classification
- Kingdom: Plantae
- Clade: Tracheophytes
- Clade: Angiosperms
- Clade: Eudicots
- Clade: Rosids
- Order: Fabales
- Family: Fabaceae
- Subfamily: Faboideae
- Genus: Chamaecytisus
- Species: C. eriocarpus

Binomial name
- Chamaecytisus eriocarpus (Boiss.) Rothm.

= Chamaecytisus eriocarpus =

Species of plant

Chamaecytisus eriocarpus is a species of flowering plant in the family Fabaceae. It is native to the majority of the Balkan Peninsula and Turkey, with varying native occurrence on the Greek islands.

As of August 2025, Plants of the World Online accepted two subspecies:

• Chamaecytisus eriocarpus subsp. absinthioides (Janka) Niketić

• Chamaecytisus eriocarpus subsp. eriocarpus
