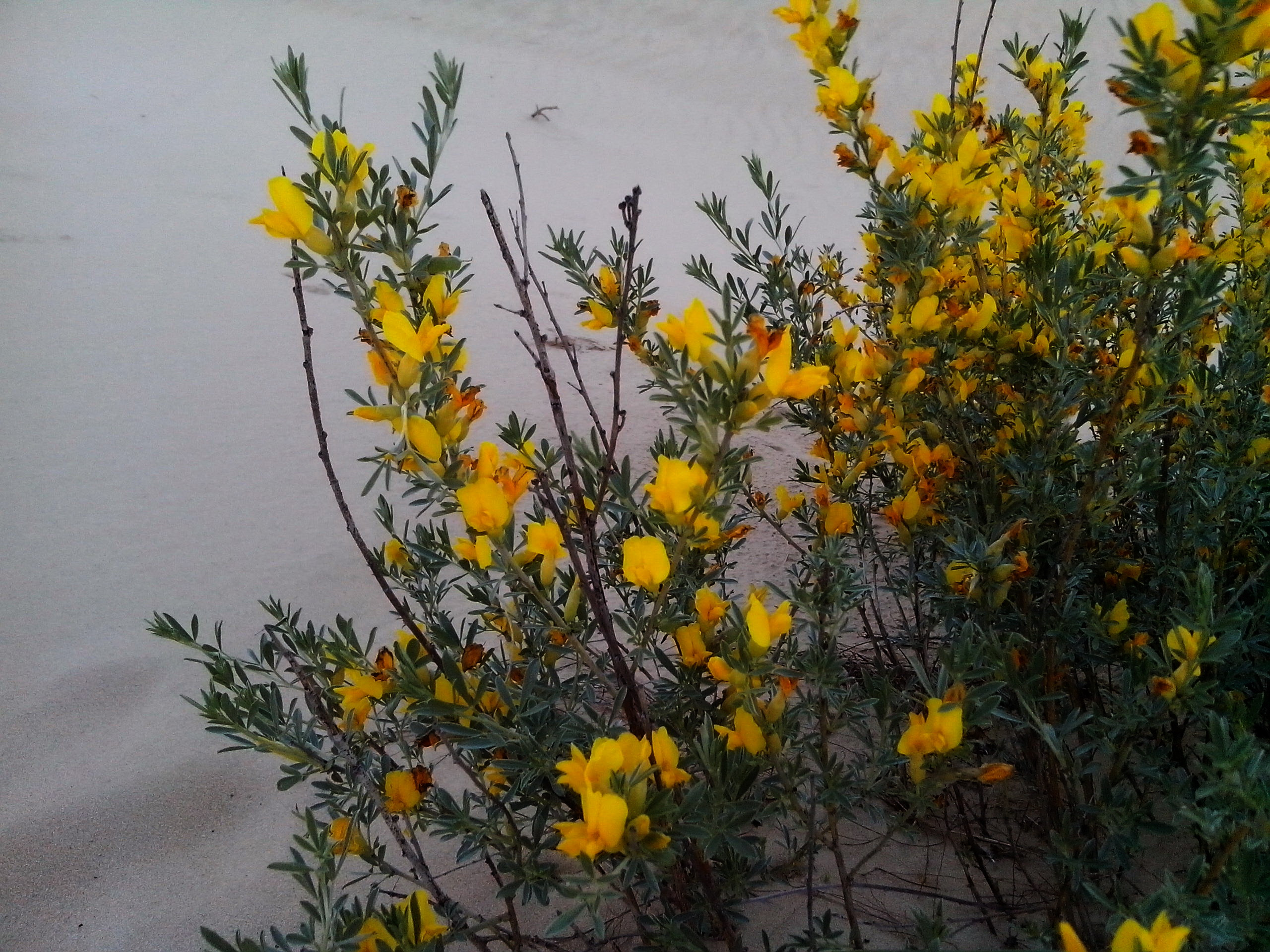

Scientific classification
- Kingdom: Plantae
- Clade: Tracheophytes
- Clade: Angiosperms
- Clade: Eudicots
- Clade: Rosids
- Order: Fabales
- Family: Fabaceae
- Subfamily: Faboideae
- Genus: Chamaecytisus
- Species: C. borysthenicus

Binomial name
- Chamaecytisus borysthenicus (Gruner) Klásk.

Synonyms
- Cytisus borysthenicus Gruner

= Chamaecytisus borysthenicus =

Species of plant

Chamaecytisus borysthenicus is a species of flowering plant in the family Fabaceae. It is native to most of Ukraine, with the notable exception of Crimea, where it has gone extinct, East European Russia, North Caucasus, Kazakhstan and West Siberia. It has been introduced to regions such as the Baltic states, Central European Russia and South European Russia.
