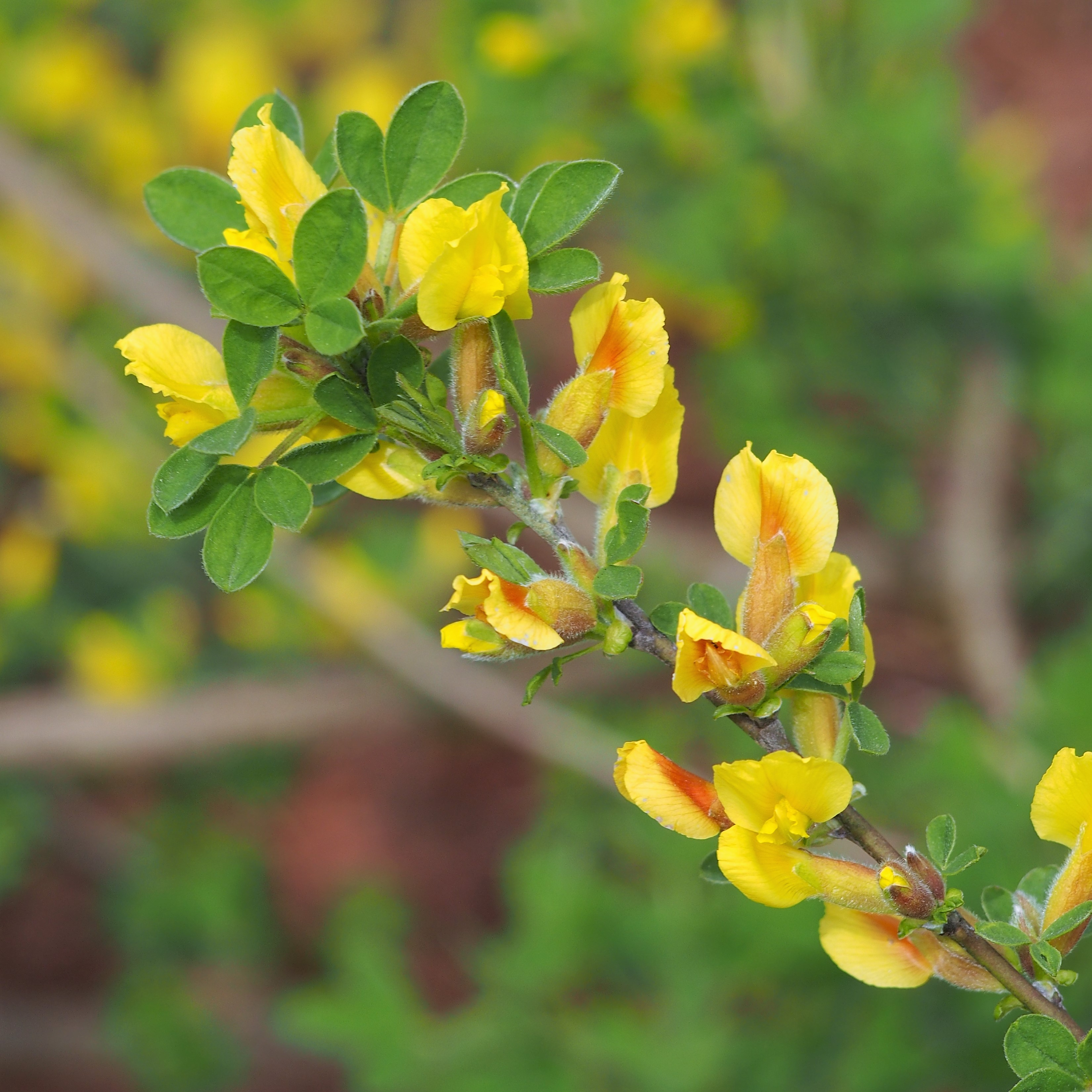

Scientific classification
- Kingdom: Plantae
- Clade: Tracheophytes
- Clade: Angiosperms
- Clade: Eudicots
- Clade: Rosids
- Order: Fabales
- Family: Fabaceae
- Subfamily: Faboideae
- Genus: Chamaecytisus
- Species: C. elongatus

Binomial name
- Chamaecytisus elongatus (Waldst. & Kit.) Link

Synonyms
- Cytisus elongatus Waldst. & Kit.

= Chamaecytisus elongatus =

Species of flowering plant

Chamaecytisus elongatus, syn. Cytisus elongatus, is a species of flowering plant in the family Fabaceae. Its native range is Europe, occurring in countries such as France, Bulgaria, Romania and countries of the Northwestern Balkan Peninsula. It has been introduced into the Baltic states, Belarus, Ukraine, the Czech Republic and Slovakia.
