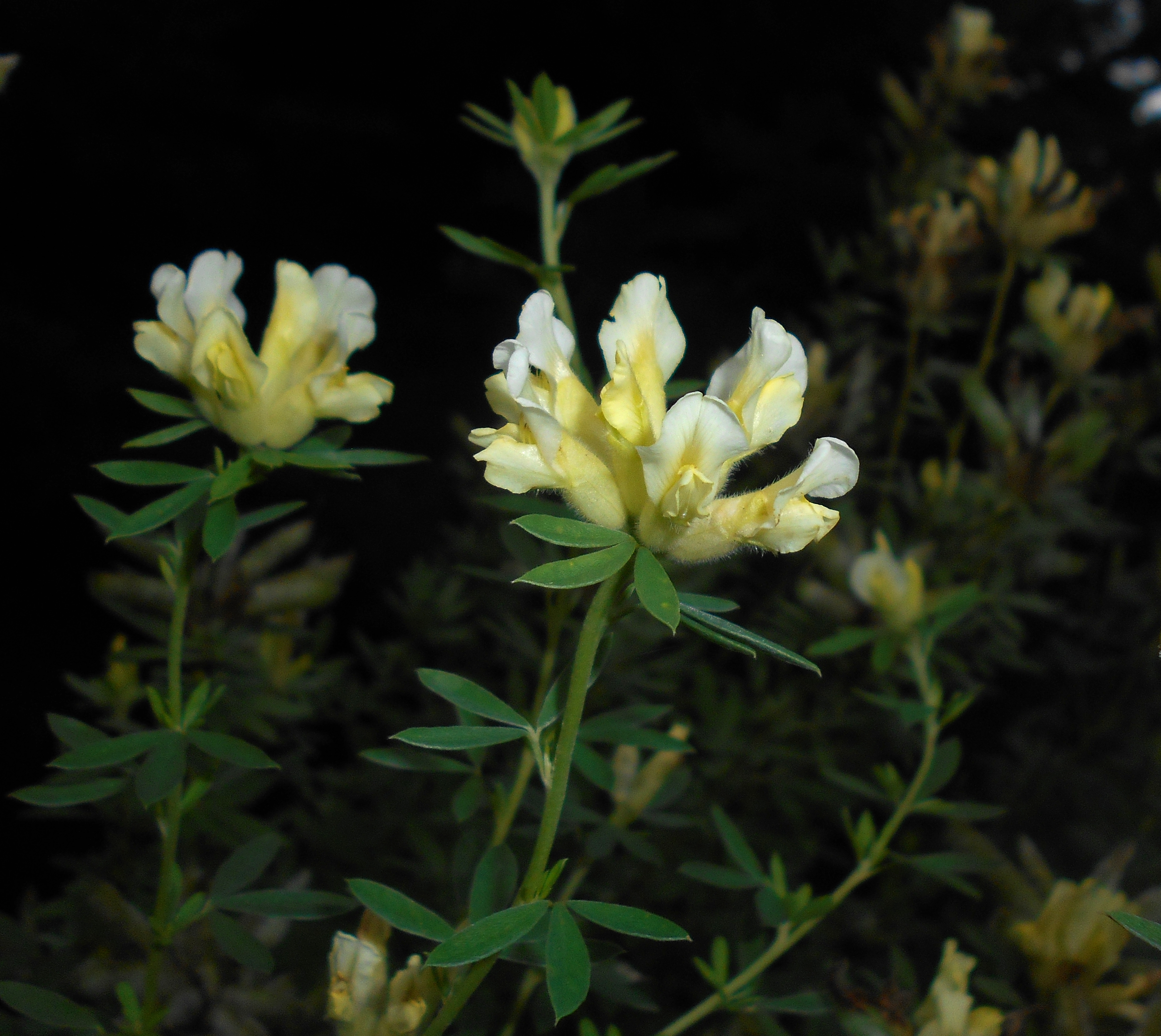
- Portuguese broom
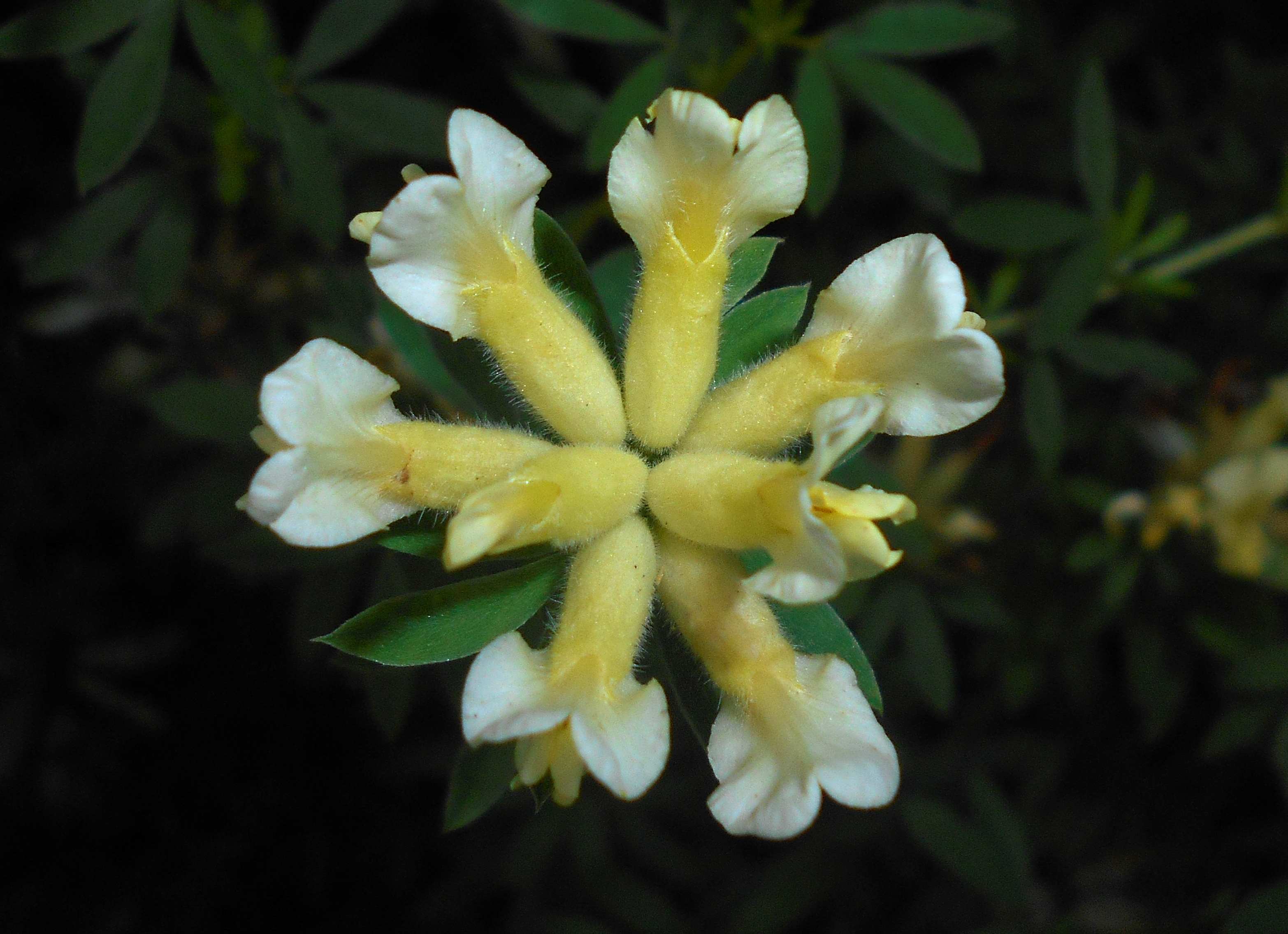
- Close-up of the species' terminal flower cluster

Scientific classification
- Kingdom: Plantae
- Clade: Tracheophytes
- Clade: Angiosperms
- Clade: Eudicots
- Clade: Rosids
- Order: Fabales
- Family: Fabaceae
- Subfamily: Faboideae
- Genus: Chamaecytisus
- Species: C. albus

Binomial name
- Chamaecytisus albus (Hacq.) Rothm.

Synonyms
- Chamaecytisus supinus subsp. albus (Hacq.) Briq.; Cytisus albus Hacq.; Cytisus leucanthus Waldst. & Kit.; Chamaecytisus albus (Hacq.) Rothm. subsp. albus

= Chamaecytisus albus =

Species of legume

Chamaecytisus albus, also called white broom or Portuguese broom, is a species of flowering plant in the family Fabaceae. It is native to Central Europe, Moldova and Ukraine, Southeastern Europe and Western Asia. The species is critically endangered in Poland and can only be found in one natural locality - near Hrubieszów in the Lublin Voivodeship.

== Description ==
Small, leguminous shrub, typically 20-80 centimeters high. Blooms from June to July.

Leaves are trifoliate, leaflets oblong-obovate, with a length to width ratio of roughly 3:1, sometimes 4:1.

Stems are slender, erect, typically covered in silver-gray to white hairs.

The flower's calyx is 11-13 mm, corolla roughly 20 mm; white, white-yellow or sulphur-yellow depending on specimen, 6-10 flowers form in each terminal cluster.

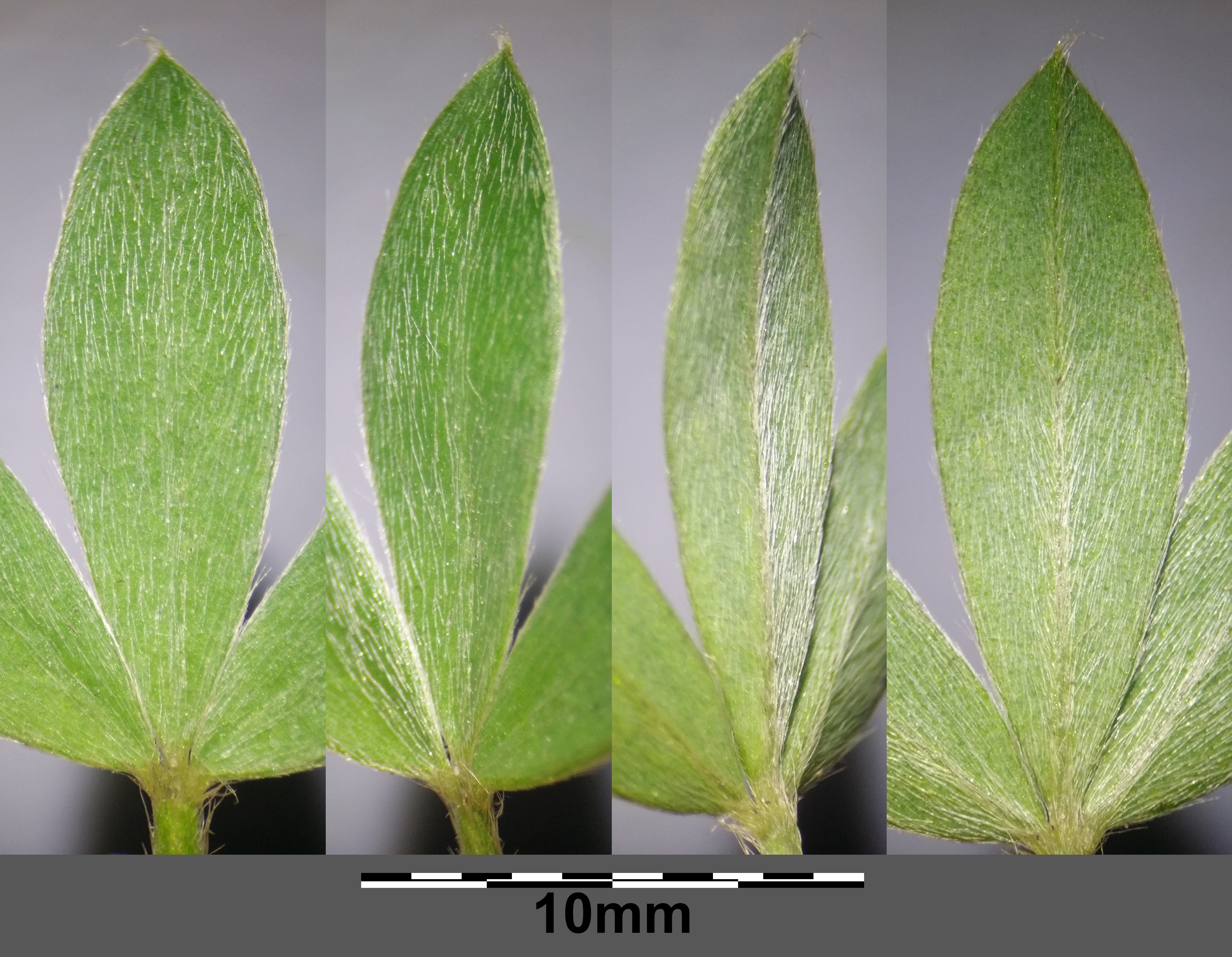
Trifoliate leaves

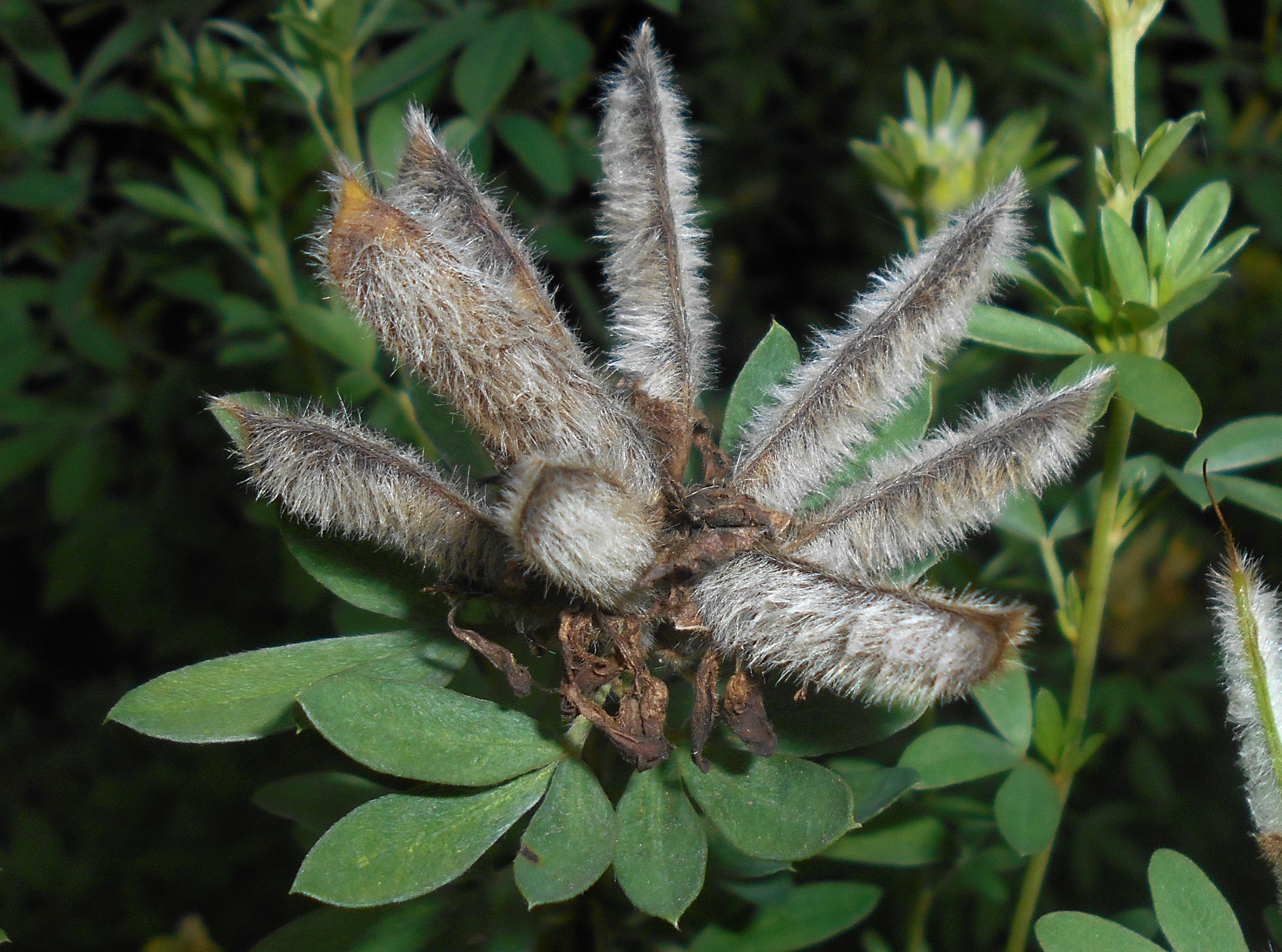
Seed pods

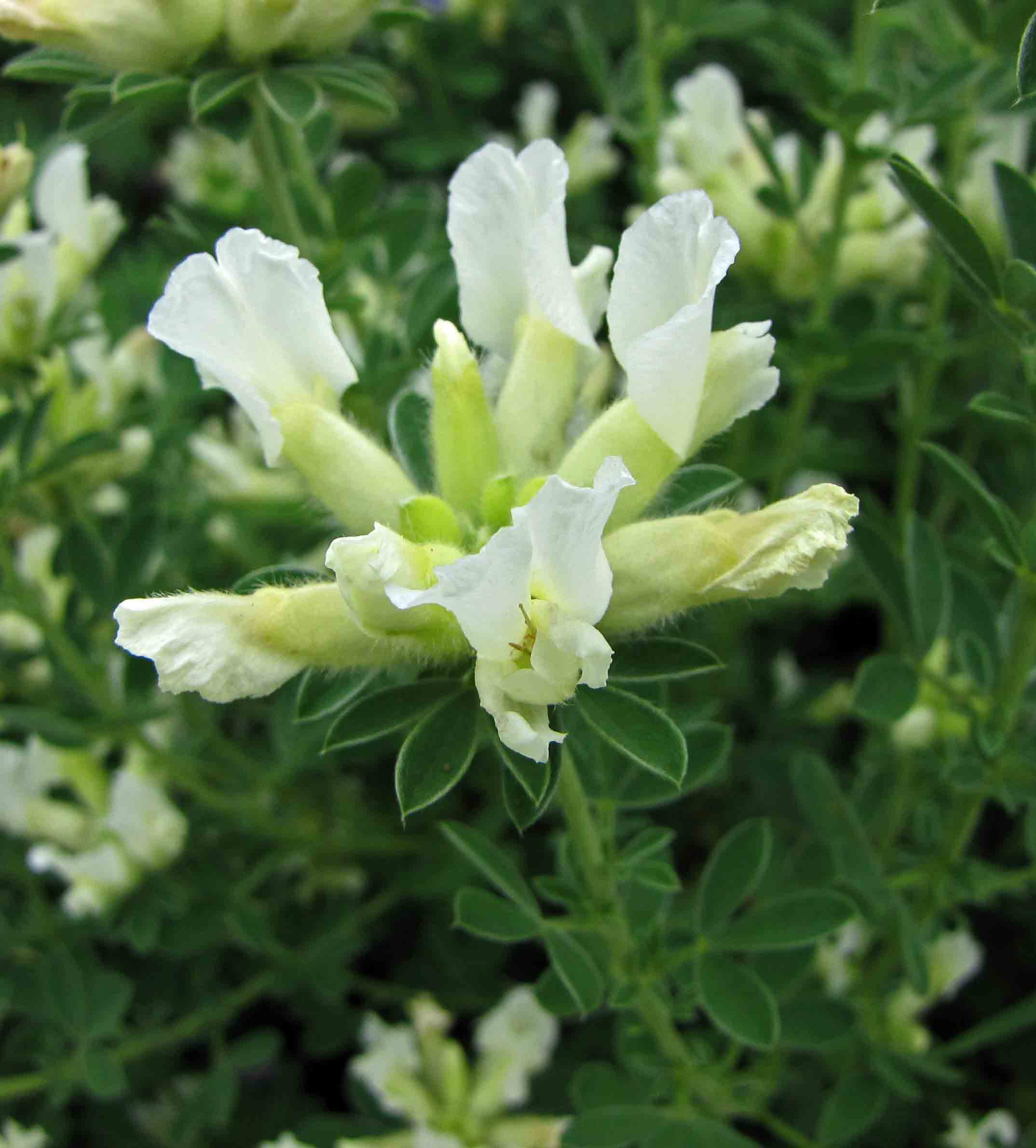
Flowers

As a broom species, it utilizes nitrogen fixation to colonize disturbed lands and control erosion of soil by supplying it with essential nutrients.

== Taxonomy ==
Chamaecytisus albus was first described by Belsazar Hacquet in 1790 as Cytisus albus. It was later transferred to the genus Chamaecytisus in 1894 as a subspecies of Chamaecytisus supinus.

=== Etymology ===
The Latin specific epithet albus means "white", which refers to the color of the species' flowers, as the English common name also suggests.

== Habitats ==
Found in open woodlands, scrublands, dry hillsides and temperate grasslands.

== Toxicity ==
Just like other plants in the Fabaceae family, such as Cytisus scoparius or Laburnum anagyroides, the species contains alkaloids, notably cytisine, known to cause respiratory issues, nausea, vomiting and abdominal pain when ingested in significant amounts. Additionally, it has potential to cause an allergic reaction or skin irritation in some individuals.
