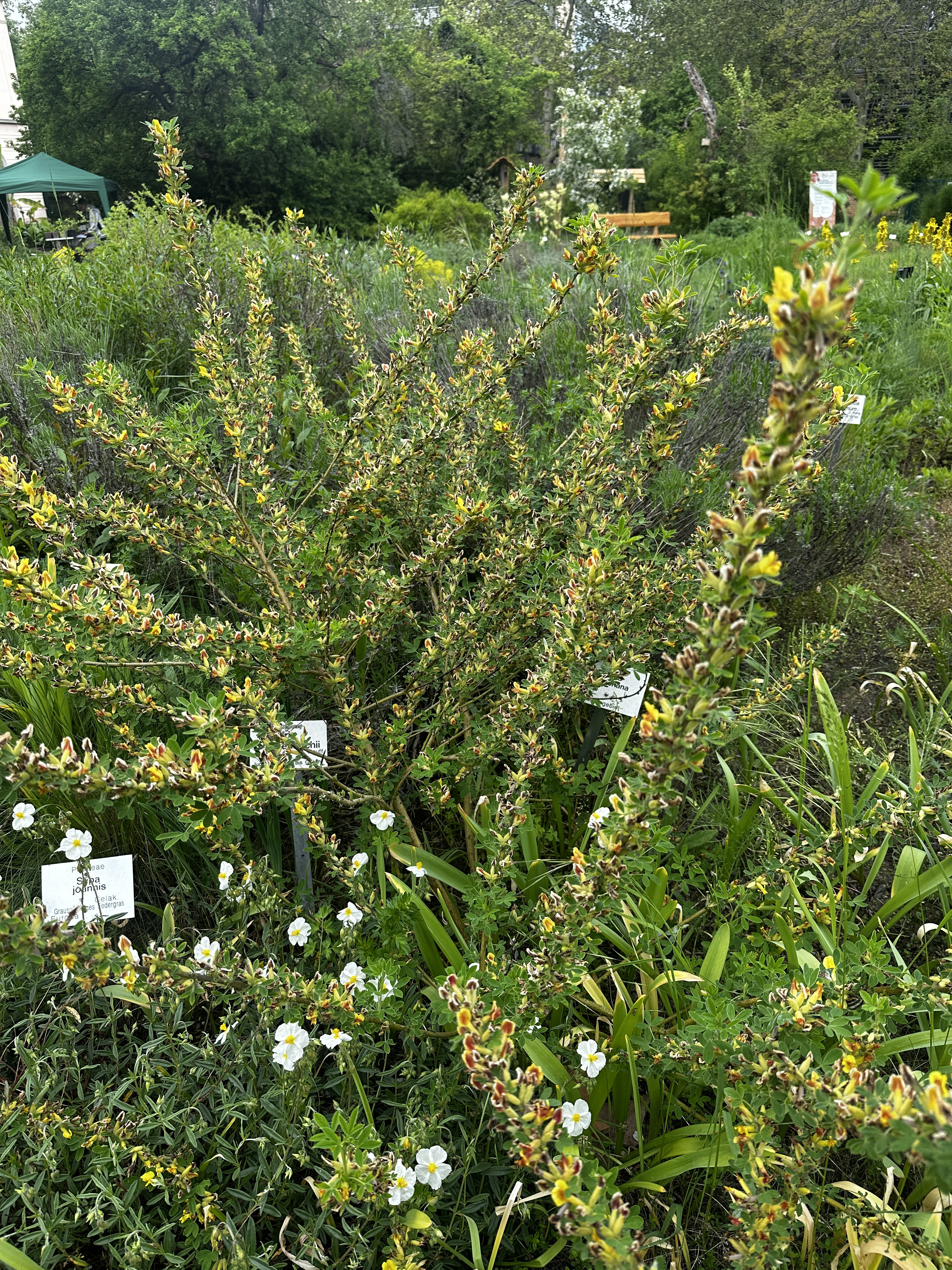

Scientific classification
- Kingdom: Plantae
- Clade: Tracheophytes
- Clade: Angiosperms
- Clade: Eudicots
- Clade: Rosids
- Order: Fabales
- Family: Fabaceae
- Subfamily: Faboideae
- Genus: Chamaecytisus
- Species: C. leiocarpus

Binomial name
- Chamaecytisus leiocarpus (A.Kern.) Rothm.

Synonyms
- Cytisus hirsutus subsp. leiocarpus (A.Kern.) Briq.; Cytisus leiocarpus A.Kern.

= Chamaecytisus leiocarpus =

Species of flowering plant

Chamaecytisus leiocarpus is a species of shrubby flowering plant in the family Fabaceae. It is native to Europe, ranging from the countries of the Northwest Balkan Peninsula and Albania to Bulgaria and Romania.

== Gallery ==
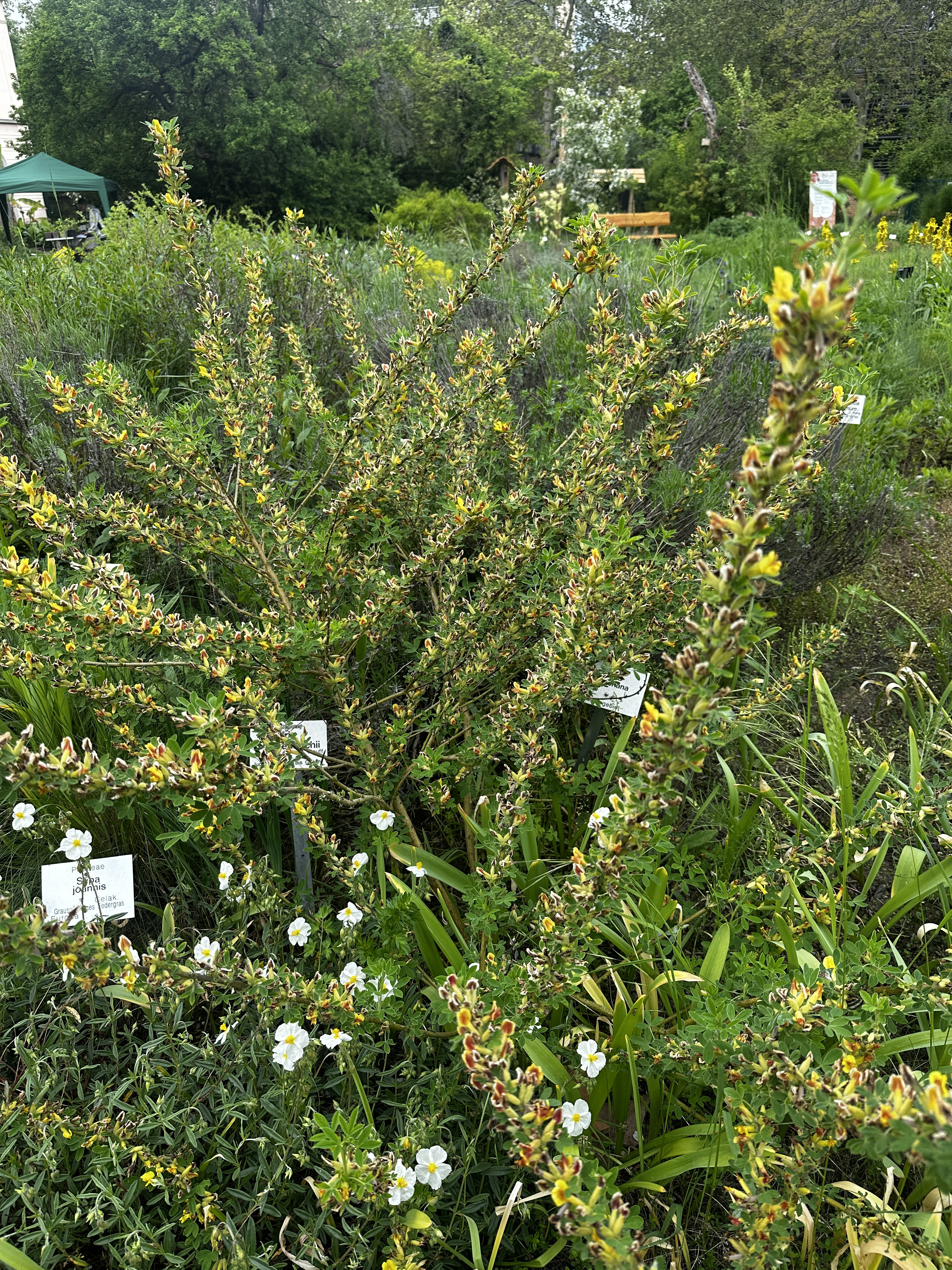
Habit of species

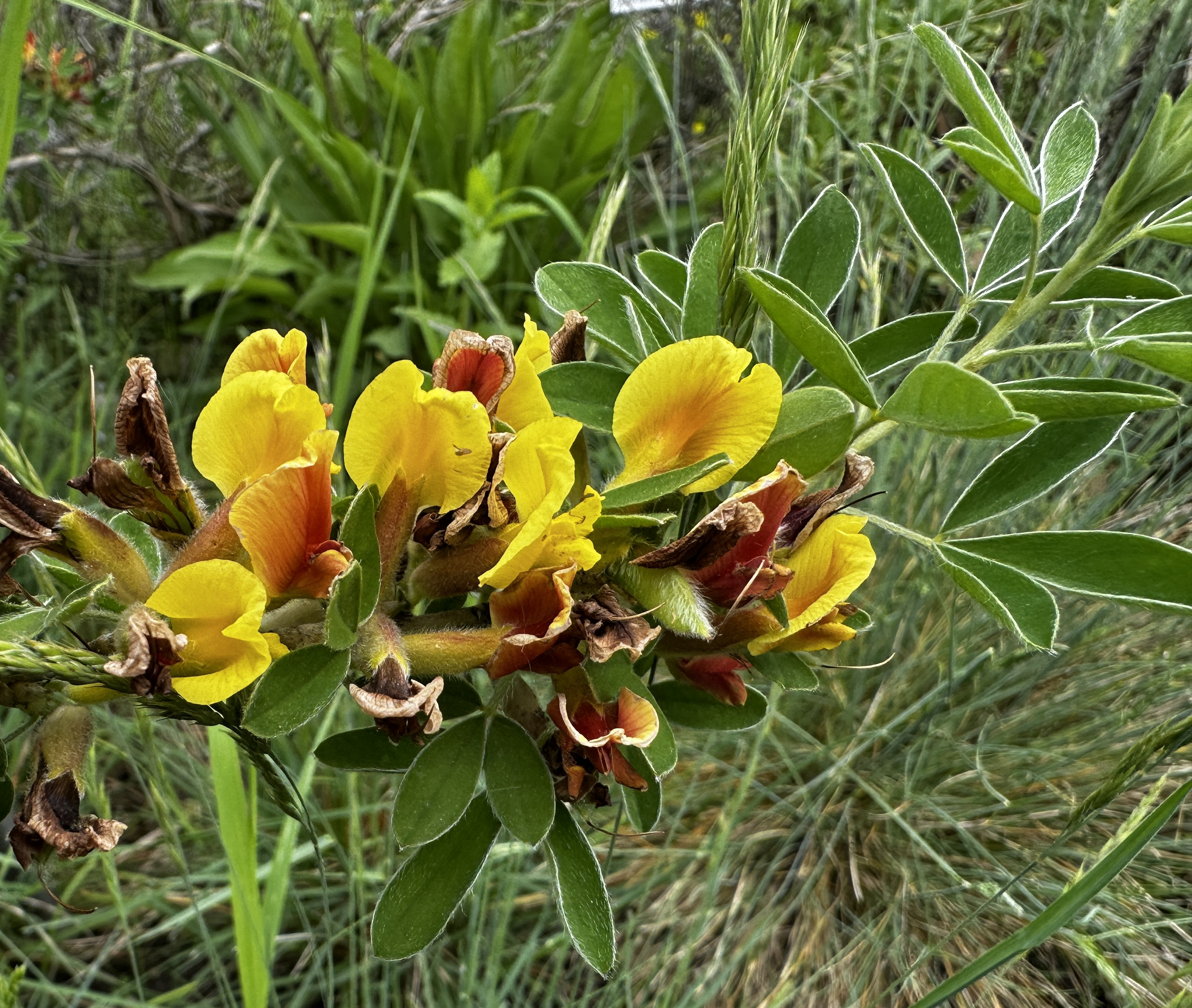
Flowers
