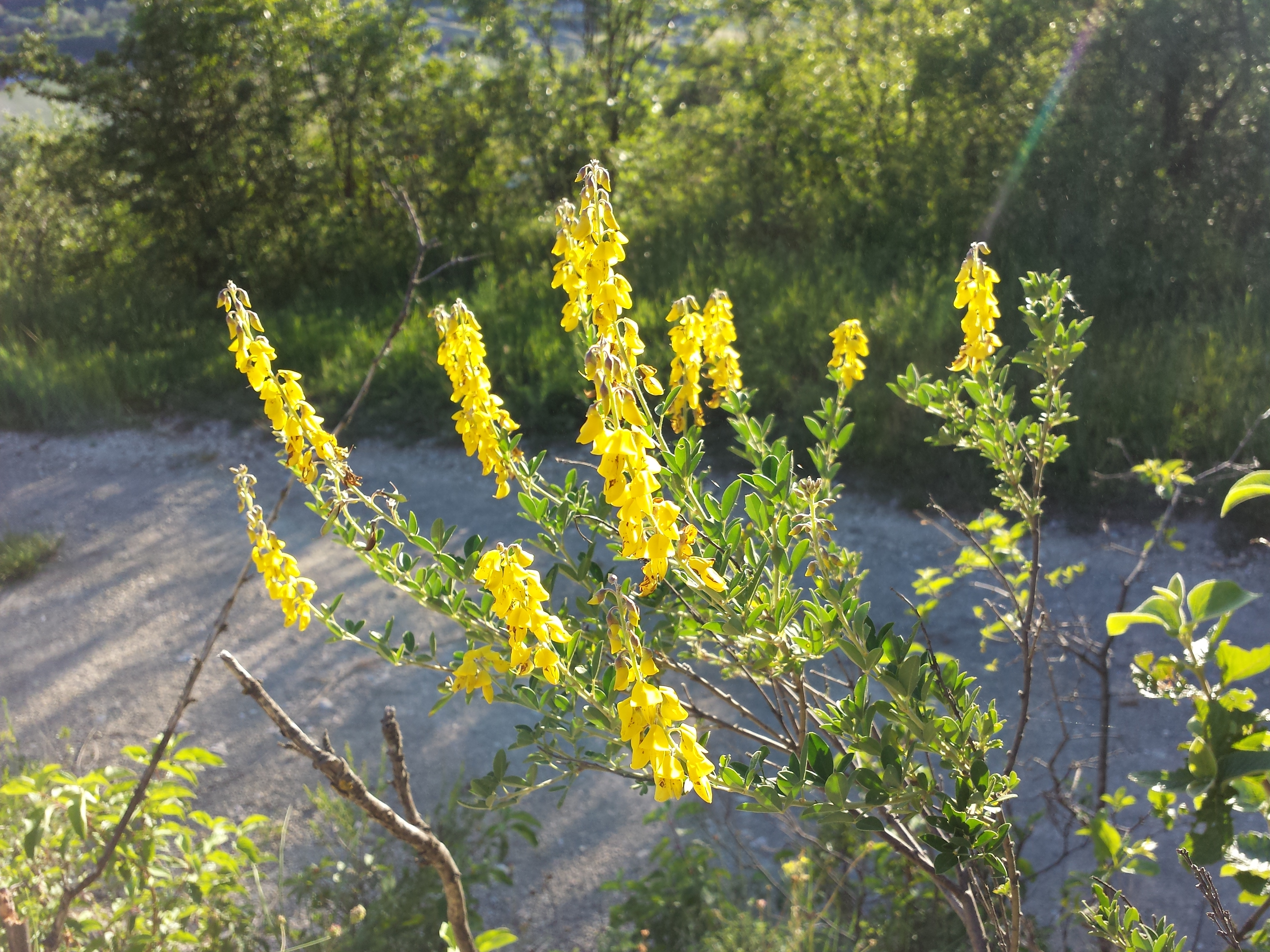

Conservation status
- Least Concern (IUCN 3.1)

Scientific classification
- Kingdom: Plantae
- Clade: Tracheophytes
- Clade: Angiosperms
- Clade: Eudicots
- Clade: Rosids
- Order: Fabales
- Family: Fabaceae
- Subfamily: Faboideae
- Genus: Cytisus
- Species: C. nigricans

Binomial name
- Cytisus nigricans (L.)

Synonyms
- Lembotropis nigricans L.

= Cytisus nigricans =

Species of legume

Cytisus nigricans, the black broom, is a species of flowering plant in the subfamily Faboideae of the family Fabaceae. Growing 3–5 ft (0.91–1.52 m) tall, it is a slender deciduous shrub with erect branches. Masses of brilliant yellow, slightly fragrant pea-like flowers appear in long racemes on the current year's growth in summer and early autumn.

The more compact cultivar 'Cyni', to 1 m (3.3 ft), has gained the Royal Horticultural Society's Award of Garden Merit. It is hardy but prefers a sheltered position in full sun, with poor soil. It is preferable to remove the mature seed pods in autumn.
