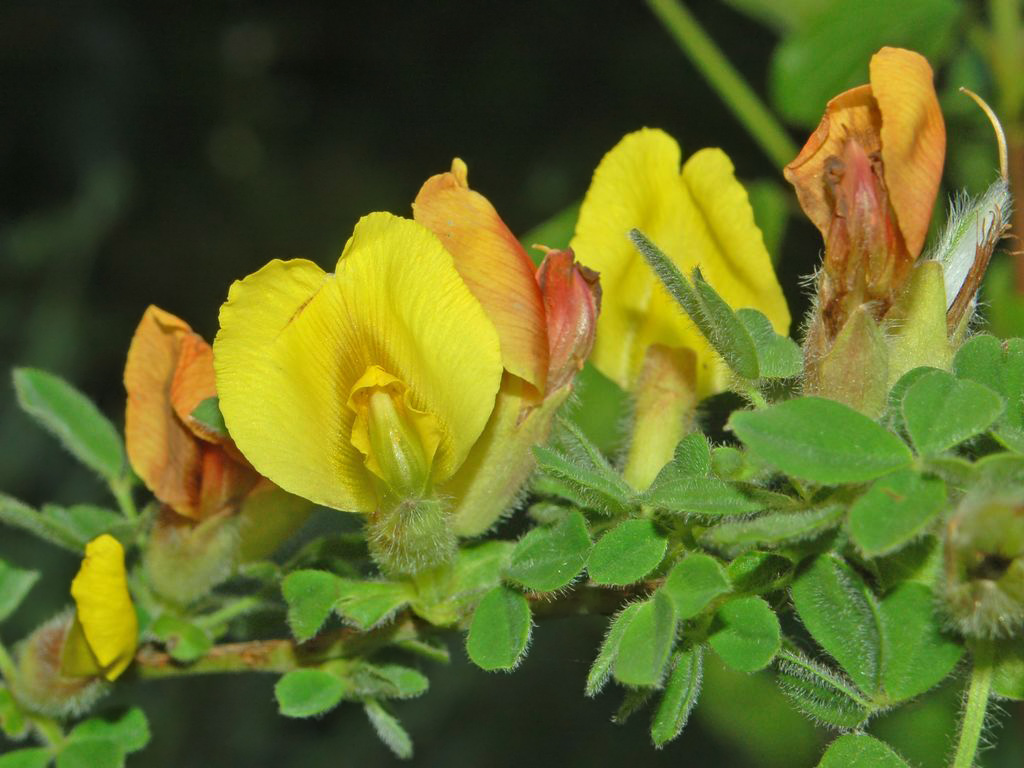

Scientific classification
- Kingdom: Plantae
- Clade: Tracheophytes
- Clade: Angiosperms
- Clade: Eudicots
- Clade: Rosids
- Order: Fabales
- Family: Fabaceae
- Subfamily: Faboideae
- Genus: Chamaecytisus
- Species: C. hirsutus

Binomial name
- Chamaecytisus hirsutus L.

Synonyms
- List: Chamaecytisus ciliatus (Wahlenb.) Rothm.; Chamaecytisus hirsutissimus (K.Koch) Czerep.; Chamaecytisus hirsutus (L.) Link; Chamaecytisus leucotrichus (Schur) Czerep.; Chamaecytisus polytrichus (M.Bieb.) Rothm.; Chamaecytisus proteus (Zum.) Holub; Chamaecytisus supinus (L.) Link; Cytisus aggregatus Schur; Cytisus alpestris Schur; Cytisus capitatus Scop.; Cytisus ciliatus Wahlenb.; Cytisus colchicus Albov; Cytisus falcatus Waldst. & Kit.; Cytisus gallicus A.Kern.; Cytisus hirsutissimus K.Koch; Cytisus leucotrichus (Schur) Schur; Cytisus polytrichus M.Bieb.; Cytisus prostratus Scop.; Cytisus proteus Zum.; Cytisus pumilus De Not.; Cytisus supinus L.; Genista capitata (Scop.) Scheele; Genista supina (L.) Scheele

= Chamaecytisus hirsutus =

Species of legume

Chamaecytisus hirsutus (clustered broom or hairy broom) is a perennial plant belonging to the genus Chamaecytisus of the family Fabaceae.

== Description ==
Chamaecytisus hirsutus reaches on average 30–40 centimetres (12–16 in) of height, with a maximum height of about 100 centimetres (39 in). The stem is more or less ascendent, woody in the lower part, branched, with ascending annual and herbaceous branches (suffruticose) with hairs 3 millimeters long (hence the Latin name hirsutus of this species, meaning hairy). The small deciduous leaves are trifoliate, ovate to elliptic, hairy on both sides, 18–25 millimetres (0.71–0.98 in) long, with a petiole. The flowers are initially orange-yellow, then tend to be colored with reddish brown. The flowering period extends from April through June. Its legumes (seed pods) are 25–40 millimetres (0.98–1.57 in) long, very hairy and mature in late Summer.

== Taxonomy ==
Chamaecytisus hirsutus was first described by Carl Linnaeus in 1753 as Cytisus hirsutus. It was transferred to the genus Chamaecytisus in 1831.

=== Subspecies ===
As of August 2025, Plants of the World Online accepted two subspecies:

- Chamaecytisus hirsutus subsp. hirsutus
- Chamaecytisus hirsutus subsp. polytrichus (M.Bieb.) Ponert, synonyms include Cytisus polytrichus M.Bieb. and Chamaecytisus polytrichus (M.Bieb.) Rothm.

== Gallery ==
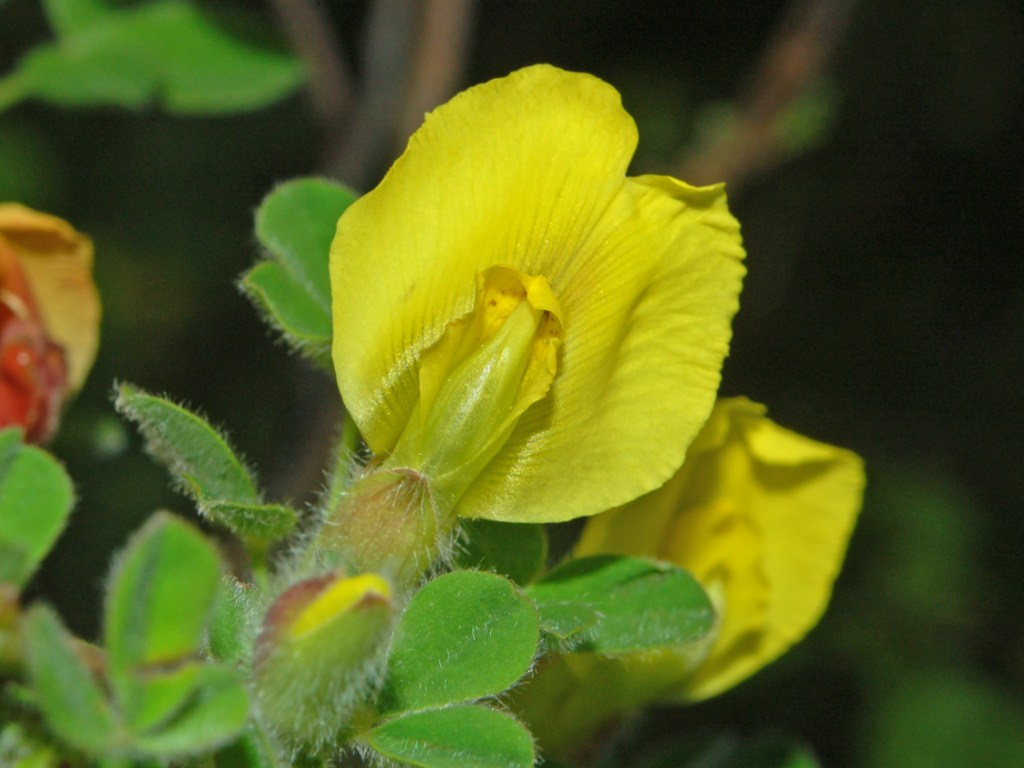
Flower

Flower

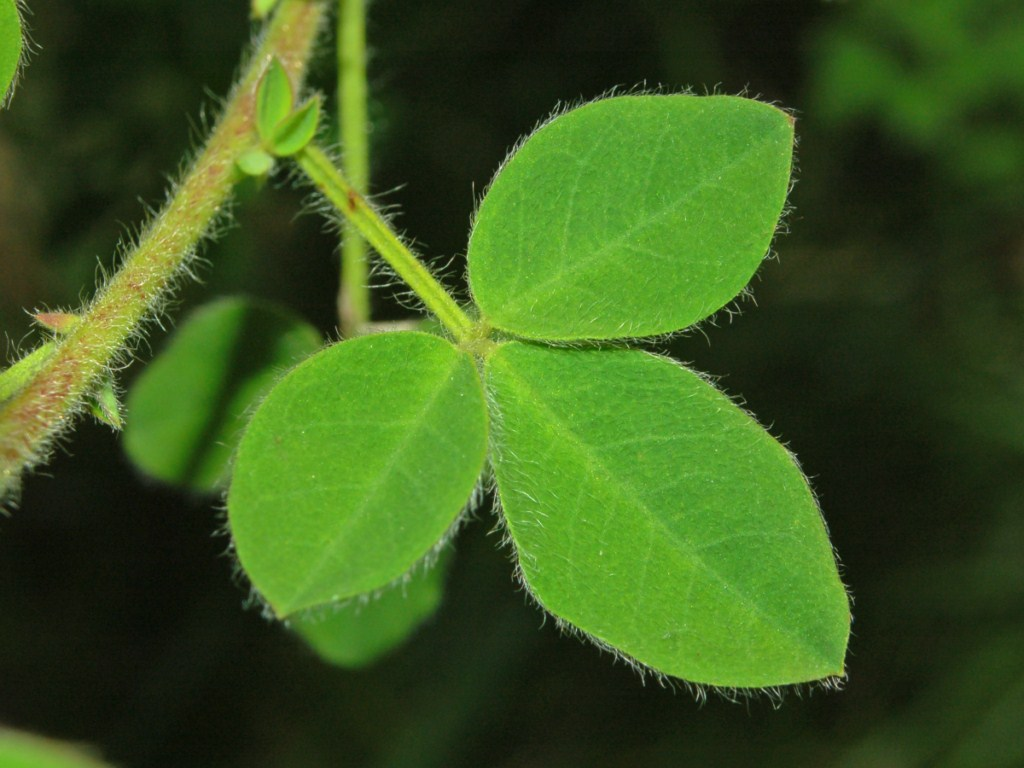
Leaves

== Distribution ==
This plant is native to Turkey, Austria, Czechoslovakia, Hungary, Albania, Bulgaria, former Yugoslavia, Greece, Italy, Romania and France.

== Habitat ==
These plants can be found on calcareous and arid environments, such as dry meadows and slopes at the edge of the woods. They are typically found at an altitude of 0–1,500 metres (0–4,921 ft).
