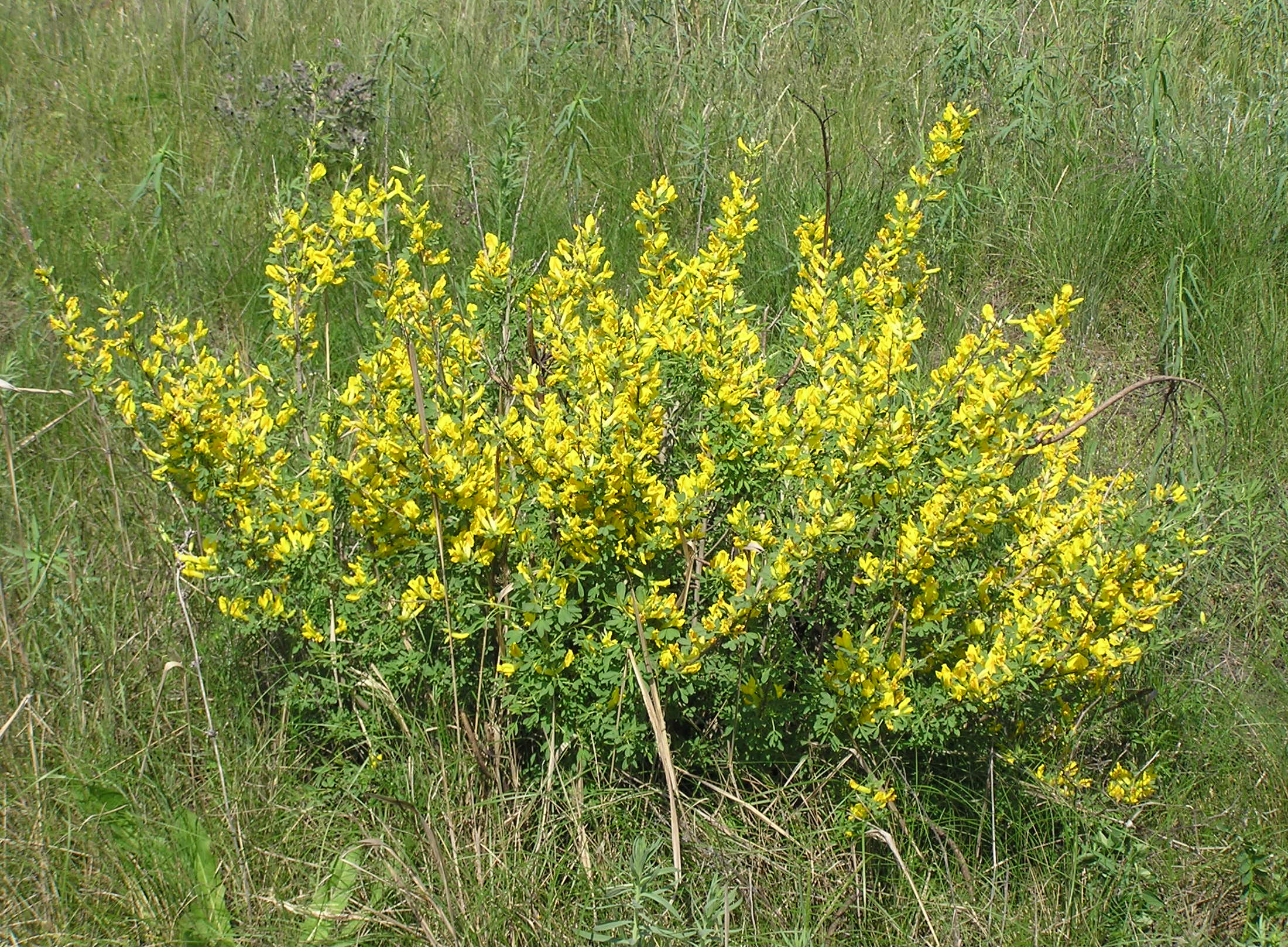
- Chamaecytisus ruthenicus

Scientific classification
- Kingdom: Plantae
- Clade: Tracheophytes
- Clade: Angiosperms
- Clade: Eudicots
- Clade: Rosids
- Order: Fabales
- Family: Fabaceae
- Subfamily: Faboideae
- Tribe: Genisteae
- Genus: Chamaecytisus; Link (1831)

Species
- 41–50; see text.

Synonyms
- Aulonix Raf. (1838); Diaxulon Raf. (1838); Tubocytisus Fourr. (1868); Viborgia Moench (1794), nom. rej.

= Chamaecytisus =

Genus of legumes

Chamaecytisus is a genus of flowering plants in the legume family, Fabaceae. It includes 43 species which range from the Canary Islands and Morocco through mainland Europe to western Siberia, Kazakhstan, the Caucasus, Anatolia, and the eastern Mediterranean. It belongs to the subfamily Faboideae. It has been treated as a synonym of Cytisus.

C. proliferus is a tree from the Canary Islands used as a fodder crop around the world.

== Species ==
As of August 2025, Plants of the World Online accepted the following species:

- Chamaecytisus albus (Hacq.) Rothm.
- Chamaecytisus austriacus (L.) Link
- Chamaecytisus banaticus (Griseb. & Schenk) Rothm.
- Chamaecytisus borysthenicus (Gruner) Klásk.
- Chamaecytisus calcareus (Velen.) Kuzmanov
- Chamaecytisus cassius (Boiss.) Rothm.
- Chamaecytisus danubialis (Velen.) Rothm.
- Chamaecytisus drepanolobus (Boiss.) Rothm.
- Chamaecytisus elongatus (Waldst. & Kit.) Link
- Chamaecytisus eriocarpus (Boiss.) Rothm.
- Chamaecytisus erythropetalus Yıldırım
- Chamaecytisus frivaldszkyanus (Degen) Kuzmanov ex Greuter, Burdet & G.Long
- Chamaecytisus heuffelii (Wierzb.) Rothm.
- Chamaecytisus hirsutus (L.) Link
- Chamaecytisus jankae (Velen.) Rothm.
- Chamaecytisus korabensis Pifkó & Barina
- Chamaecytisus kovacevii (Velen.) Rothm.
- Chamaecytisus kreczetoviczii (E.D.Wissjul.) Holub
- Chamaecytisus lasiosemius (Boiss.) Pifkó
- Chamaecytisus leiocarpus (A.Kern.) Rothm.
- Chamaecytisus lindemannii (Krecz.) Klásk.
- Chamaecytisus litwinowii (Krecz.) Klásk.
- Chamaecytisus mollis (Cav.) Greuter & Burdet
- Chamaecytisus nejceffii (Urum.) Rothm.
- Chamaecytisus paczoskii (Krecz.) Klásk.
- Chamaecytisus pineticola Ivchenko
- Chamaecytisus podolicus (Błocki) Klásk.
- Chamaecytisus ponomarjovii (Seredin) Czerep.
- Chamaecytisus proliferus (L.f.) Link
- Chamaecytisus proteus (Zumagl.) Holub
- Chamaecytisus pseudojankae Pifkó & Barina
- Chamaecytisus × pseudorochelii (Simonk.) Pifkó
- Chamaecytisus pulvinatus (Quézel) Raynaud
- Chamaecytisus purpureus (Scop.) Link
- Chamaecytisus pygmaeus (Willd.) Rothm.
- Chamaecytisus ratisbonensis (Schaeff.) Rothm.
- Chamaecytisus rochelii (Wierzb. ex Griseb. & Schenk) Rothm.
- Chamaecytisus ruthenicus (Fisch. ex Woł.) Klásk.
- Chamaecytisus skrobiszewskii (Pacz.) Klásk.
- Chamaecytisus spinescens Rothm.
- Chamaecytisus supinus (L.) Link
- Chamaecytisus tommasinii (Vis.) Rothm.
- Chamaecytisus triflorus (Lam.) Skalická
- Chamaecytisus virescens (Kovács ex Neilr.) Dostál
- Chamaecytisus wulfii (Krecz.) Klásk.
- Chamaecytisus zingeri (Nenukow ex Litv.) Klásk.
