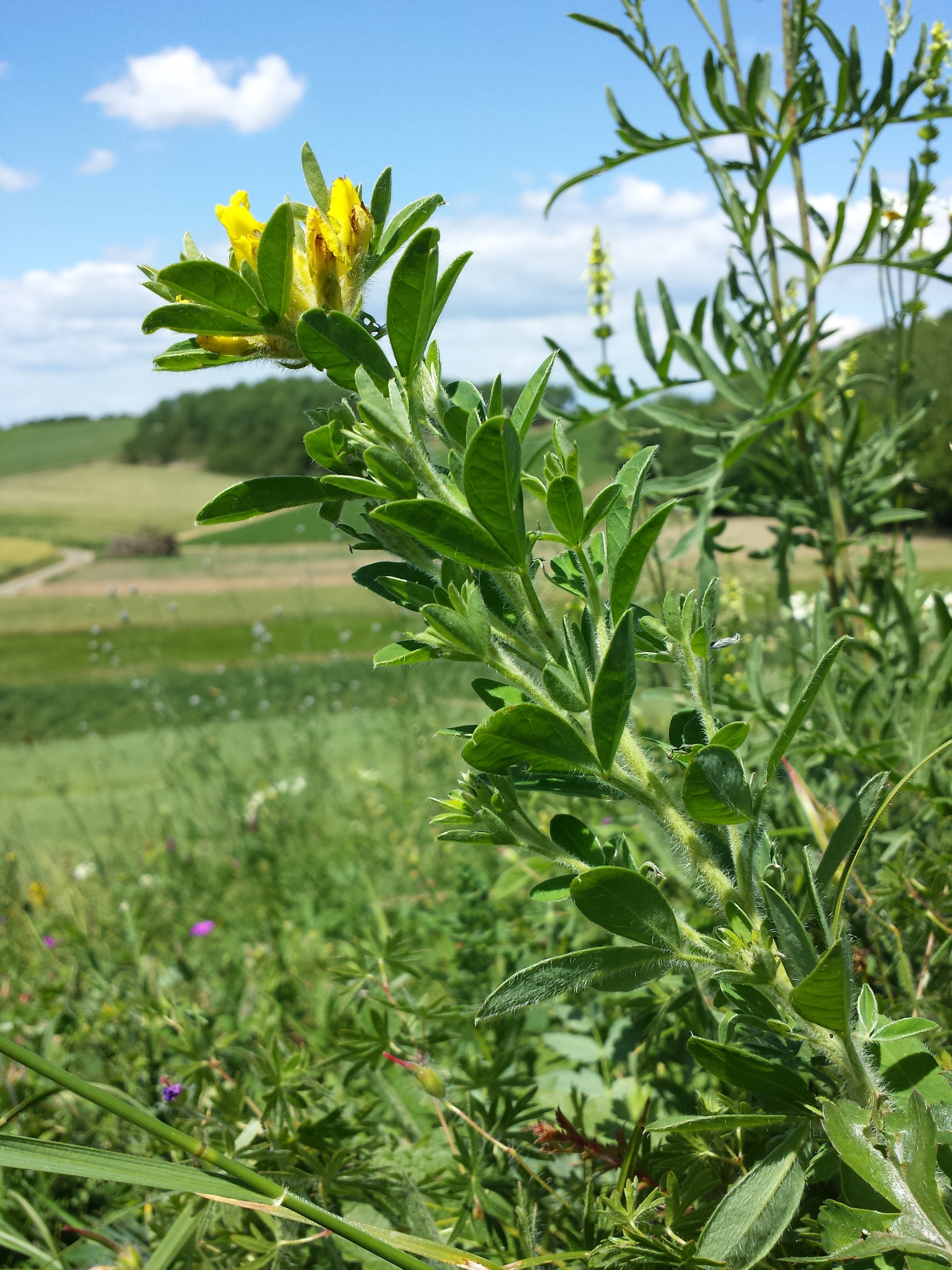

Scientific classification
- Kingdom: Plantae
- Clade: Embryophytes
- Clade: Tracheophytes
- Clade: Angiosperms
- Clade: Eudicots
- Clade: Rosids
- Order: Fabales
- Family: Fabaceae
- Subfamily: Faboideae
- Genus: Chamaecytisus
- Species: C. supinus

Binomial name
- Chamaecytisus supinus (L.) Link

Synonyms
- Cytisus hirsutus var. supinus (L.) Fiori; Cytisus supinus L.; Cytisus capitatus subsp. supinus (L.) Bonnier & Layens

= Chamaecytisus supinus =

Species of flowering plant

Chamaecytisus supinus, also called big-flower broom is a species of flowering plant in the family Fabaceae. It is native to Europe, ranging from Spain to Central and South Europe, going as far as East Thrace in Turkey. It has additionally been introduced to the territories of the Baltic States.

It grows to around 60-120 cm (2-4 ft) tall, with trifolioate leaves and small hairs on the seed pods.

== Habitats ==
The big-flower broom grows primarily in the temperate biome, in sparse forests, grassy or rocky plains and mountains. It has been observed to grow at altitudes from sea level to about 1000 meters.

== See also ==
• Chamaecytisus albus
