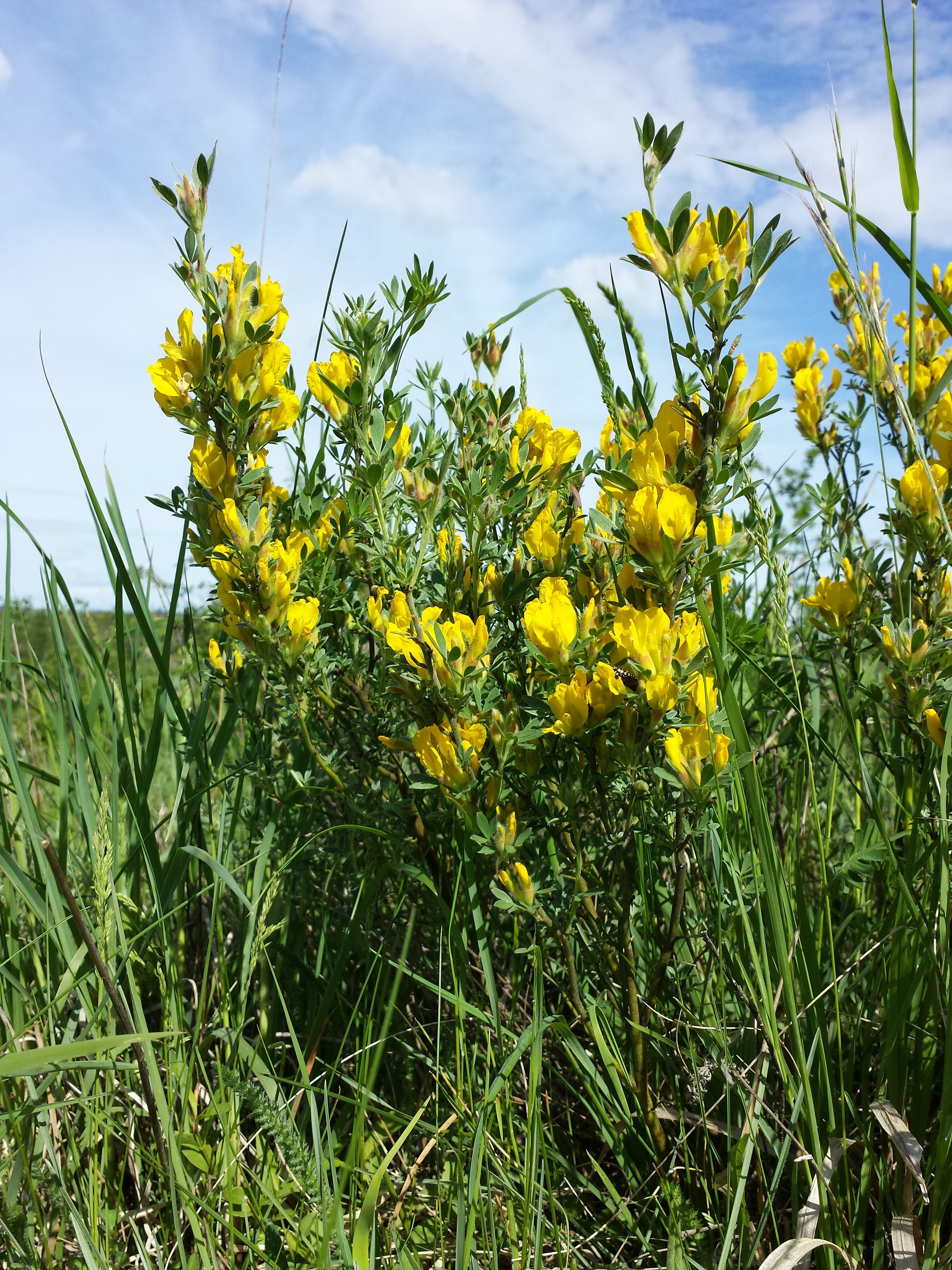

Scientific classification
- Kingdom: Plantae
- Clade: Tracheophytes
- Clade: Angiosperms
- Clade: Eudicots
- Clade: Rosids
- Order: Fabales
- Family: Fabaceae
- Subfamily: Faboideae
- Genus: Chamaecytisus
- Species: C. austriacus

Binomial name
- Chamaecytisus austriacus (L.) Link

Synonyms
- Cytisus supinus subsp. austriacus (L.) Briq.; Cytisus austriacus L.; Genista austriaca (L.) Scheele

= Chamaecytisus austriacus =

Species of flowering plant

Chamaecytisus austriacus, syn. Cytisus austriacus, is a species of flowering plant in the family Fabaceae. The species is native to Europe and Asia, ranging from East Central Europe to the Balkans, including Turkey, ending at North Caucasus and European Russia. It has additionally been introduced to the territories of the Baltic states and Belarus.

== Subtaxa ==
As of August 2025, Plants of the World Online accepted two subspecies:

• Chamaecytisus austriacus subsp. austriacus

• Chamaecytisus austriacus subsp. stefanoffii (Stoj.) Kuzmanow
