= Werner Rothmaler =

German botanist

Werner Walter Hugo Paul Rothmaler (20 August 1908 – 13 April 1962) was a German botanist and from 1953 until 1962 head of the Institute for Agricultural Biology of the University of Greifswald. His areas of expertise included plant geography and systematics.

== Career ==
Rothmaler's secondary schooling took place in Weimar at the Wilhelm-Ernst-Gymnasium. His wide interests ranged from botany to painting and politics. He became friendly with the family of the artist Lyonel Feininger and particularly with his son Andreas, and he was inspired by the ideas of the Bauhaus. All this brought him into conflict with the school authorities and he left the school without his abitur. From 1927, he completed a gardening apprenticeship at Schloss Belvedere, Weimar and in the gardens of the stately homes in Potsdam.

During his time in Potsdam he came into contact with the phytogeographer Ludwig Diels, Director of the Botanical Museum and the Botanical Garden in Berlin-Dahlem. Since his lack of school qualifications made university study impossible Rothmaler was offered a position as working student in Jena with the botanists Theodor Herzog, Otto Renner and Erwin Bünning.

For some time he worked as an archivist for aristocratic families in Hohenthurm near Halle (Saale) and in Glauchau. By this time he was a member of the Communist Party (KPD) and in 1933 it became desirable for him to leave Germany. His mentor from the Potsdam period, Ludwig Diels, got him a place on a botanical expedition to Spain. This turned into a stay of many years. At this time Rothmaler was occupied with various activities at botanical and pharmaceutical institutions, but meanwhile was still active as a collector of plants and thus developed an excellent knowledge of the Spanish flora. Much of his activity centred on Barcelona and he had a series of casual jobs at the University of Barcelona with Pius Font i Quer. Rothmaler edited the exsiccata series Alchemillae exsiccatae (1938).

At the beginning of the Spanish Civil War, Rothmaler was on holiday in Portugal, and a return to Spain was no longer possible. However, he again managed to get different jobs, ending up at the National Agricultural Research Centre in Lisbon. In 1940 it became impossible for him to stay in Portugal and he was forcibly repatriated with his wife to Germany. He was briefly interned in a camp near Metz, then was drafted into the army. After seven months of military service, he was released on the grounds of pulmonary tuberculosis. He then spent some time working at the Kaiser Wilhelm Institute for Biology in Berlin under Fritz von Wettstein.

In June 1943 he managed to obtain exemption from the matriculation requirements and to graduate at the Friedrich-Wilhelms-Universität in Berlin with the thesis Studies of the Vegetation of Southwestern Portugal. At the end of World War II Rothmaler was near Stecklenberg in Harz. The predecessor of today's Leibniz Institute of Plant Genetics and Crop Plant Research had been relocated there. Under the influence of the Soviet cultural officers the research group was assigned a large agricultural operation, the Gatersleben estate, near Gatersleben to move to. Rothmaler was soon appointed to a position as head of department.

In 1947 Rothmaler was awarded his doctorate from the University of Halle with a still unpublished work on the genus Lachemilla (family Rosaceae, synonym of Alchemilla), which is widespread in Central and South America. In 1949 he became lecturer in Halle, and in 1950 full Professor.

From work done in his time in Gatersleben and Halle, in 1950 Rothmaler published his Allgemeine Taxonomie und Chorologie der Pflanzen (General taxonomy and chorology of plants), and the first edition of his Exkursionsflora (Excursion flora).

In 1953, Rothmaler was appointed professor at Greifswald, where he was made head of the Institute for Agricultural Biology.

From its early days until his death he was an active participant in the work of Flora Europaea.

On the initiative of Rothmaler the student scientific circle, "Jean-Baptiste de Lamarck" was established in 1953 for students at the University of Greifswald interested in field biology, zoology, botany and environmental matters.

In 1954 he was made founding President of the GDR's Gesellschaft zur Verbreitung wissenschaftlicher Kenntnisse (Society for the dissemination of scientific knowledge), a post he held until his death. In 1958 he was awarded the silver Patriotic Order of Merit.

== Works ==
Rothmaler was author and editor of a series of botanical monographs and textbooks. He produced more than 190 publications, including a monograph on the genus Antirrhinum (1956) and his most famous work, the Exkursionsflora von Deutschland (Excursion flora of Germany) (3 volumes) (1966).

The current edition of the Excursion flora (commonly known just as "Rothmaler") consists of five volumes: Lower plants (Volume 1), vascular plants – main volume (volume 2), vascular plants – illustrations (volume 3), Critical volume (volume 4) and Volume 5 – Herbaceous ornamental and useful plants.

Unlike other floras, such as that of Erich Oberdorfer, the second volume is supplemented by a third volume (vascular plants), in which the essential particulars are clarified by line drawings. The third volume contains black and white drawings of all determinable 2800 species in the second volume, making it a unique resource for the identification of species. The fourth volume also includes critical taxa of vascular plants, i.e. subspecies, varieties or ecotypes in large numbers. In contrast, the habitat information given on the plants is not as detailed as in Oberdorfer. The fifth volume was published in 2008, and will allow the identification of the herbaceous ornamental and useful plants cultivated in the field in Germany.

== Taxa honouring Rothmaler ==
The genus Rothmaleria Font Quer (with the species Rothmaleria granatensis) from the daisy family (Asteraceae) is named after Werner Rothmaler.

In addition to this genus name the following names of plant species, subspecies and hybrids, as well as a fungal species preserve his name:

- Alchemilla rothmaleri
- Alyssum rothmaleri (= A. minus)
- Armeria rothmaleri 1987
- Centaurea paniculata ssp. rothmalerana = C. rothmalerana = Acosta rothmalerana
- Festuca rubra L. var. rothmaleri = F. rothmaleri
- Helianthum x rothmaleri
- Hieracium laevigatum ssp. rothmaleri
- Lupinus rothmaleri
- Myrica rothmalerana
- Phyllosticta rothmaleri
- Silene rothmaleri

== Personal life ==
Rothmaler was married twice. From the first marriage (with Wilhelmine Neumann, 1911–2002) he had two daughters (Ursula and Susanne), from his second marriage (to Elisabeth Kecker, 1921–1993) two sons (Valentin and Philipp).

Rothmaler was given a state funeral in Weimar.

In 2008, to mark the centenary of his birth, on the initiative of the Lamarck Circle he founded, a plaque was attached to the former family home in Greifswald.
