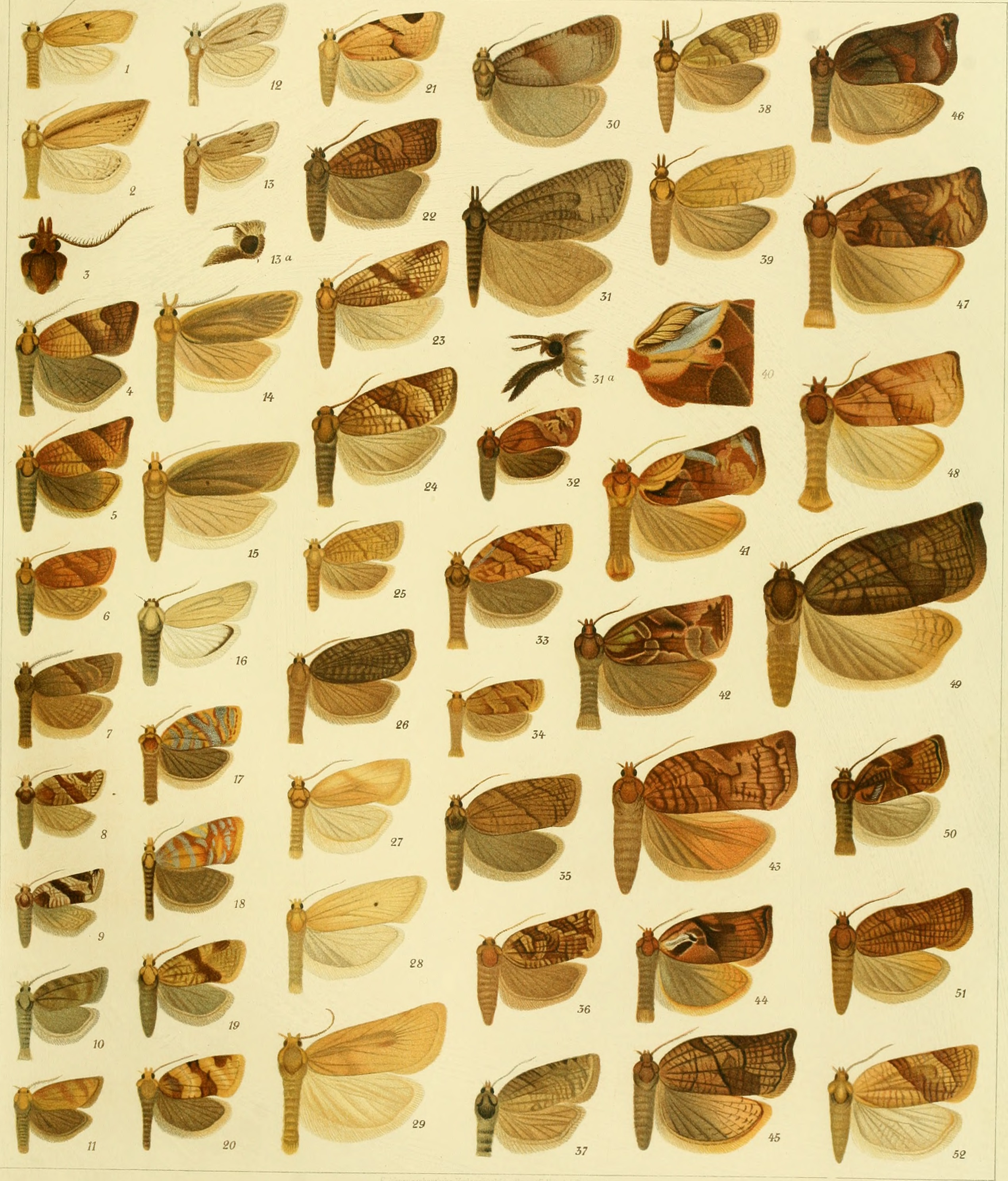
- Philedonides seeboldiana in Kennel Die palaearktischen tortriciden figure 10 male

Scientific classification
- Domain: Eukaryota
- Kingdom: Animalia
- Phylum: Arthropoda
- Class: Insecta
- Order: Lepidoptera
- Family: Tortricidae
- Genus: Philedonides
- Species: P. seeboldiana

Binomial name
- Philedonides seeboldiana (Rössler, 1877)

Synonyms
- Amphysa seeboldiana Rössler, 1877; Amphysa gaditana Ragonot, 1889

= Philedonides seeboldiana =

Species of moth

Philedonides seeboldiana is a species of moth of the family Tortricidae. It is found in Portugal and Spain.

The wingspan is 13–14 mm. Adults are on wing from February to March.

The larvae feed on Ulex parviflorus.
