= Mirificarma ulicinella =

Scientific classification
- Domain: Eukaryota
- Kingdom: Animalia
- Phylum: Arthropoda
- Class: Insecta
- Order: Lepidoptera
- Family: Gelechiidae
- Genus: Mirificarma
- Species: M. ulicinella

Binomial name
- Mirificarma ulicinella (Staudinger, 1859)

Synonyms
- Gelechia ulicinella Staudinger, 1859

Species of moth

Mirificarma ulicinella is a moth of the family Gelechiidae. It is found in Portugal, Spain, France and Italy.

The wingspan is 5.5-6.5 mm for males and 5–6 mm for females. Adults are on wing from August to September in one generation per year.

The larvae feed on Ulex parviflorus.
