= Scrobipalpa vasconiella =

Scientific classification
- Kingdom: Animalia
- Phylum: Arthropoda
- Clade: Pancrustacea
- Class: Insecta
- Order: Lepidoptera
- Family: Gelechiidae
- Genus: Scrobipalpa
- Species: S. vasconiella

Binomial name
- Scrobipalpa vasconiella (Rössler, 1877)

Synonyms
- Lita vasconiella Rössler, 1877; Scrobipalpa drahomirae Povolný, 1966

Species of moth

Scrobipalpa vasconiella is a moth in the family Gelechiidae. It was described by Adolph Rössler in 1877. It is found on the Canary Islands and Madeira, as well as in North Africa (Algeria, Mauritania), southern Europe (Portugal, Spain, southern France, Sardinia, Sicily, Italy, former Yugoslavia, Greece, south-western Russia), and Asia from Turkey to Iran and Afganistan.

The length of the forewings is 5–7 mm (0.20–0.28 in).
