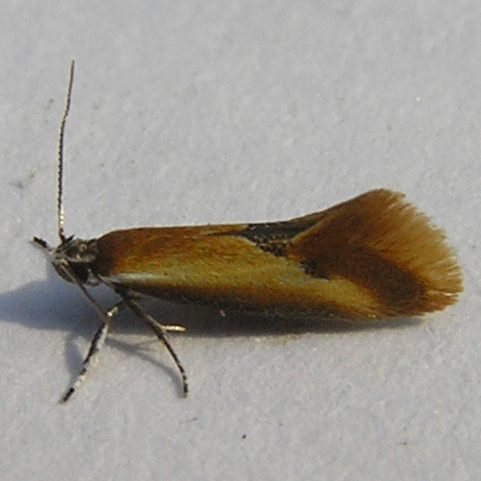
- Batia lunaris

Scientific classification
- Domain: Eukaryota
- Kingdom: Animalia
- Phylum: Arthropoda
- Class: Insecta
- Order: Lepidoptera
- Family: Oecophoridae
- Genus: Batia; Stephens, 1834

= Batia =

Genus of moths

Batia is a moth genus of the superfamily Gelechioidea.

Species :

- Batia hilszczanskii
- Batia inexpectella
- Batia internella
- Batia lambdella
- Batia lunaris
- Batia samosella
- Batia unitella
