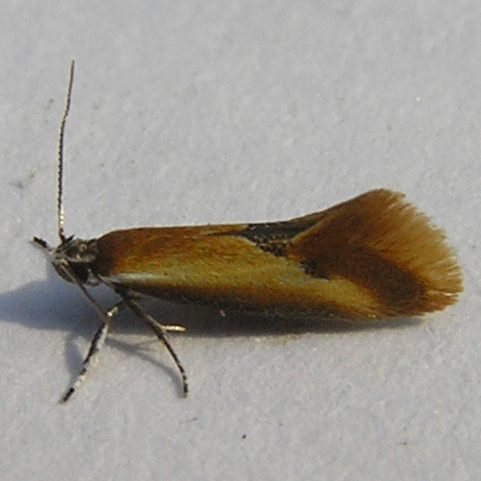
- Adult at Goes (The Netherlands)

Scientific classification
- Kingdom: Animalia
- Phylum: Arthropoda
- Clade: Pancrustacea
- Class: Insecta
- Order: Lepidoptera
- Superfamily: Gelechioidea
- Family: Oecophoridae
- Genus: Batia
- Species: B. lunaris

Binomial name
- Batia lunaris (Haworth, 1828)

Synonyms
- Numerous, see text

= Batia lunaris =

Species of moth

Batia lunaris, the lesser tawny crescent, is a species of gelechioid moth. It belongs to the subfamily Oecophorinae of the concealer moth family (Oecophoridae). It is the type species of the genus Batia, which is sometimes treated as monotypic. But this is not well warranted, as some other species usually placed there differ little from the Lesser Tawny Crescent.

== Description and ecology ==
Its wingspan is 7–10 mm, and in general the imagines (adults) resemble the close relative B. lambdella, but are only two-thirds the size of that species. Their forewings are dark ochre, slightly darker at the tips and the hairy fringe surrounding them. At the border between the light and dark parts there is a dark blotch at the dorsal margin, which forms a continuous pointed patch if the wings are laid back while the moth rests.

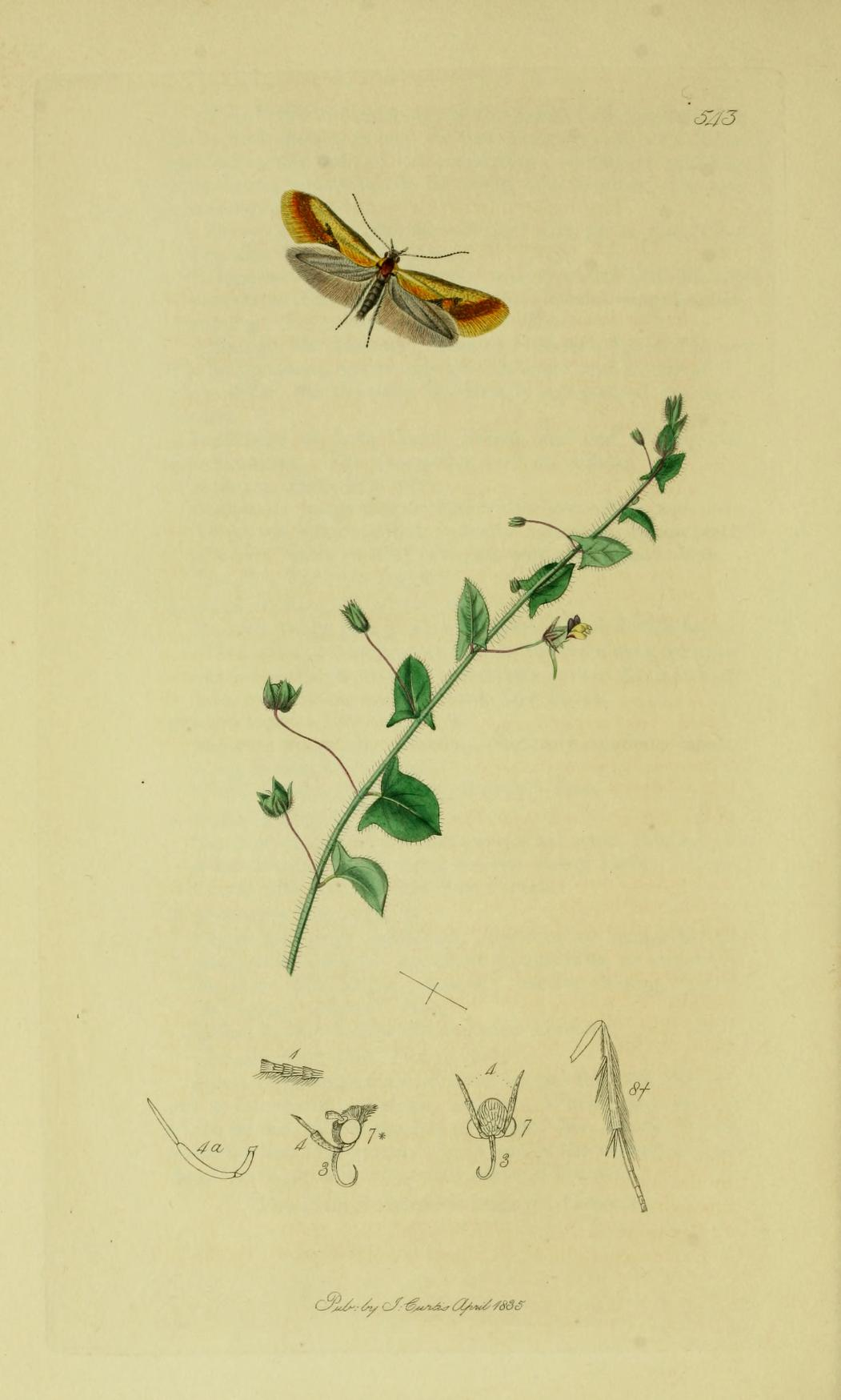
Illustration from John Curtis's British Entomology Volume 6

Meyrick- Head whitish, mixed with dark fuscous. Forewings yellow, towards dorsum orange, costa from base to 2/3 and termen broadly ferruginous; a narrow fuscous costal streak from base to 2/3; a large triangular blackish spot before tornus, its apex irregularly produced towards apex of wing. Hindwings ovate-lanceolate, rather dark grey.

It is found in Europe, where it is not rare in many woodlands. It is even widespread at the outer limit of its range, being a common sight in most of England for example. The adults fly in July and August depending on the location. This moth is generally nocturnal, but can be attracted by bright lights. The habits of their caterpillars are not sufficiently known; there is no reason to assume that they differ in that respect from their relatives, which generally live under bark and eat rotting wood and sometimes fungi.

== Synonyms ==
Junior synonyms of B. lunularis are:.

- Batia begrandella (Duponchel, 1842)
- Batia clavella (Herrich-Schäffer, 1854)
- Batia metznerella (Treitschke, 1835)
- Borkhausenia lunaris (Haworth, 1828)
- Chirocampa lunaris (Haworth, 1828)
- Oecophora lunaris (Haworth, 1828)
- Recurvaria lunaris Haworth, 1828
