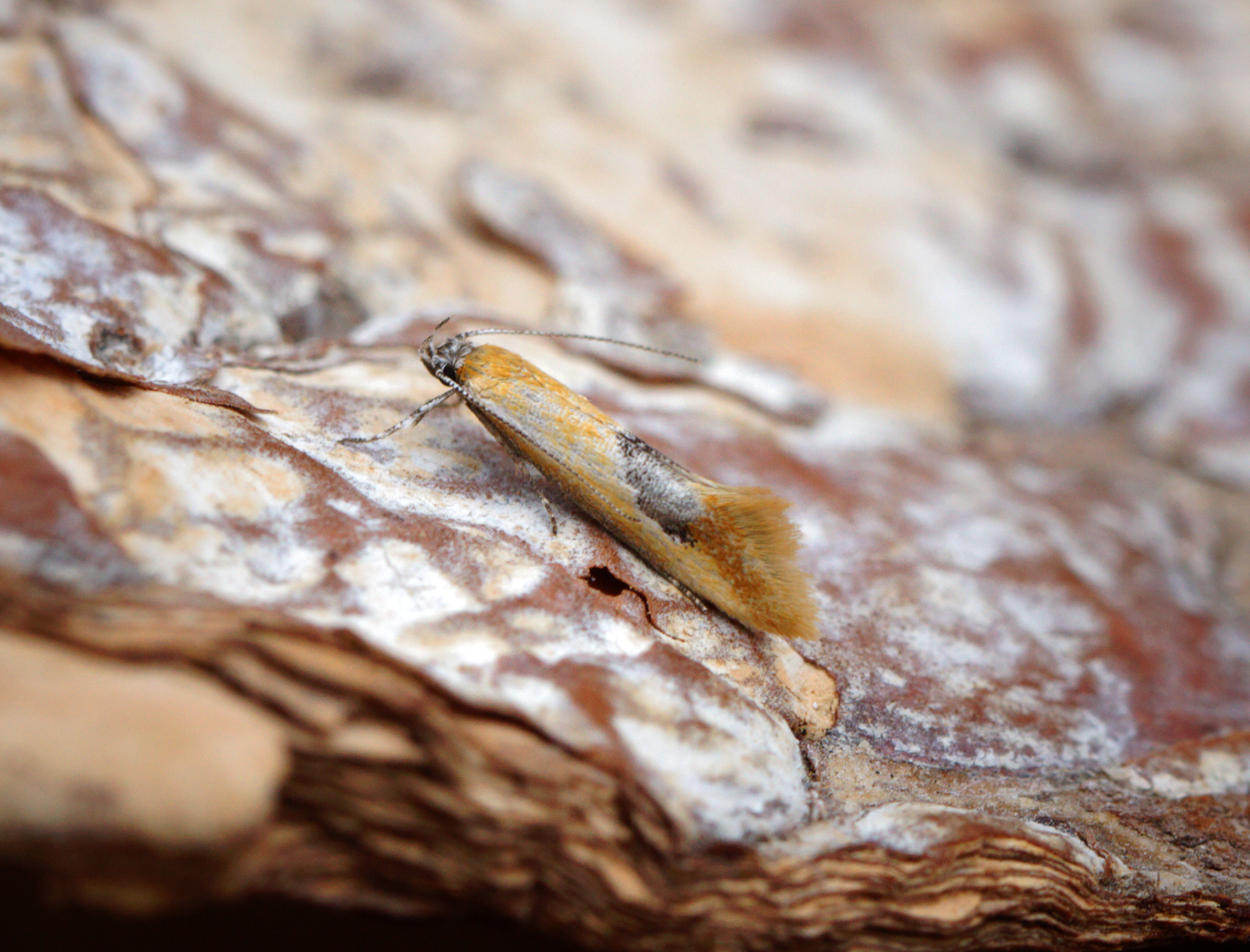
- Adult at Goes (The Netherlands)

Scientific classification
- Kingdom: Animalia
- Phylum: Arthropoda
- Clade: Pancrustacea
- Class: Insecta
- Order: Lepidoptera
- Family: Oecophoridae
- Genus: Batia
- Species: B. lambdella

Binomial name
- Batia lambdella (Donovan, 1793)

Synonyms
- Borkhausenia lambdella (Donovan, 1793)

= Batia lambdella =

Species of moth

Batia lambdella is a species of gelechioid moth. It belongs to the subfamily Oecophorinae of the concealer moth family (Oecophoridae). The genus Batia is sometimes treated as monotypic, but this seems spurious considering how similar B. lambdella is to the type species B. lunaris (Lesser Tawny Crescent).

Its wingspan is 11–17 mm, and in general the imagines (adults) resemble B. lunaris, but are about half as large again. The forewings are dark ochre, slightly darker at the tips and the hairy fringe surrounding them. At the border between the light and dark parts there is an interrupted broad dark line across the forewings, the dorsal part of which forms a continuous pointed patch if the wings are laid back while the moth rests.

It is found in Europe, where it is not rare in many woodlands. It is even widely found at the outer limit of its range, ranging far into Scotland and Ireland on the British Isles. The generally nocturnal adults fly from June to September. The caterpillars inhabit dead twigs and small branches, where they feed on dried-out decayed wood. A notable host plant is gorse (Ulex).
