= Mirificarma monticolella =

Scientific classification
- Domain: Eukaryota
- Kingdom: Animalia
- Phylum: Arthropoda
- Class: Insecta
- Order: Lepidoptera
- Family: Gelechiidae
- Genus: Mirificarma
- Species: M. monticolella

Binomial name
- Mirificarma monticolella (Rebel, 1931)

Synonyms
- Lita monticolella Rebel, 1931

Species of moth

Mirificarma monticolella is a moth of the family Gelechiidae. It is found in Italy and Albania.
