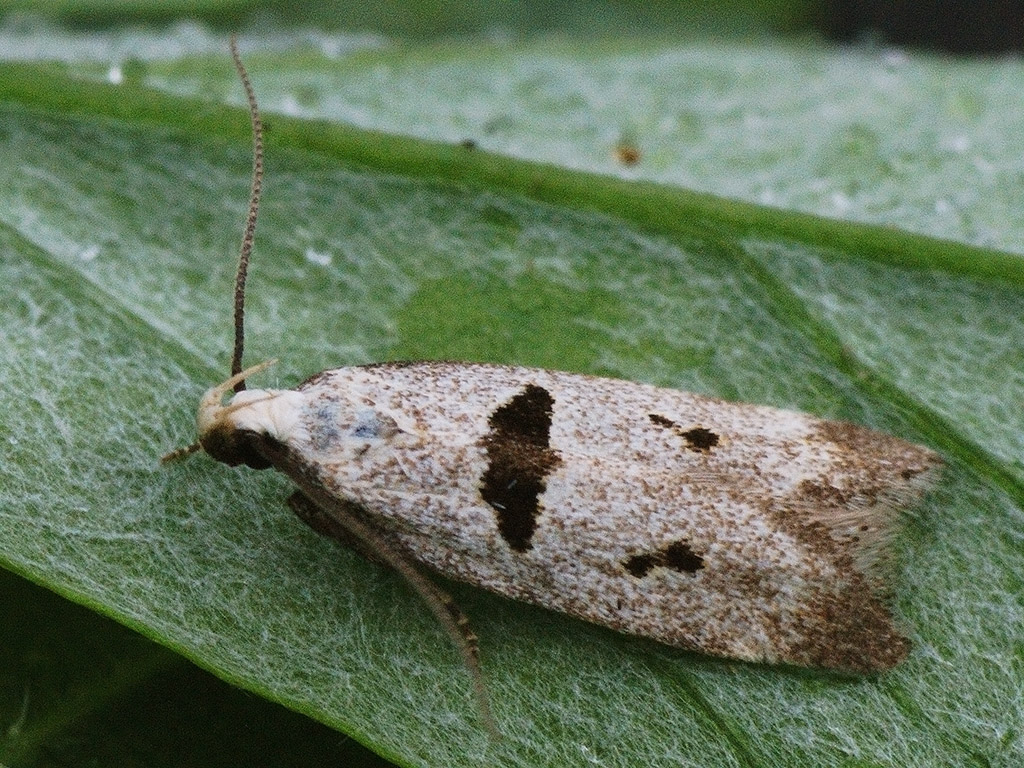

Scientific classification
- Domain: Eukaryota
- Kingdom: Animalia
- Phylum: Arthropoda
- Class: Insecta
- Order: Lepidoptera
- Family: Gelechiidae
- Genus: Mirificarma
- Species: M. cytisella

Binomial name
- Mirificarma cytisella (Treitschke, 1833)

Synonyms
- Lita cytisella Treitschke, 1833; Gelechia cytisella ab. roseella Hauder, 1918

= Mirificarma cytisella =

Species of moth

Mirificarma cytisella is a moth of the family Gelechiidae. It is found from most of Europe (except Ireland, Great Britain, Fennoscandia, the Baltic region and part of the Balkan Peninsula) to the Ural Mountains.

The wingspan is 6–8 mm for males and 6-7.5 mm for females.

The larvae feed on Cytisus nigricans, Genista, Calicotome spinosa, Ononis spinosa and possibly Laburnum anagyroides. They feed mostly from within two or three spun leaves. Larvae can be found in June, September and October.

== Subspecies ==
- Mirificarma cytisella cytisella
- Mirificarma cytisella leonella Amsel, 1959 (Portugal)
