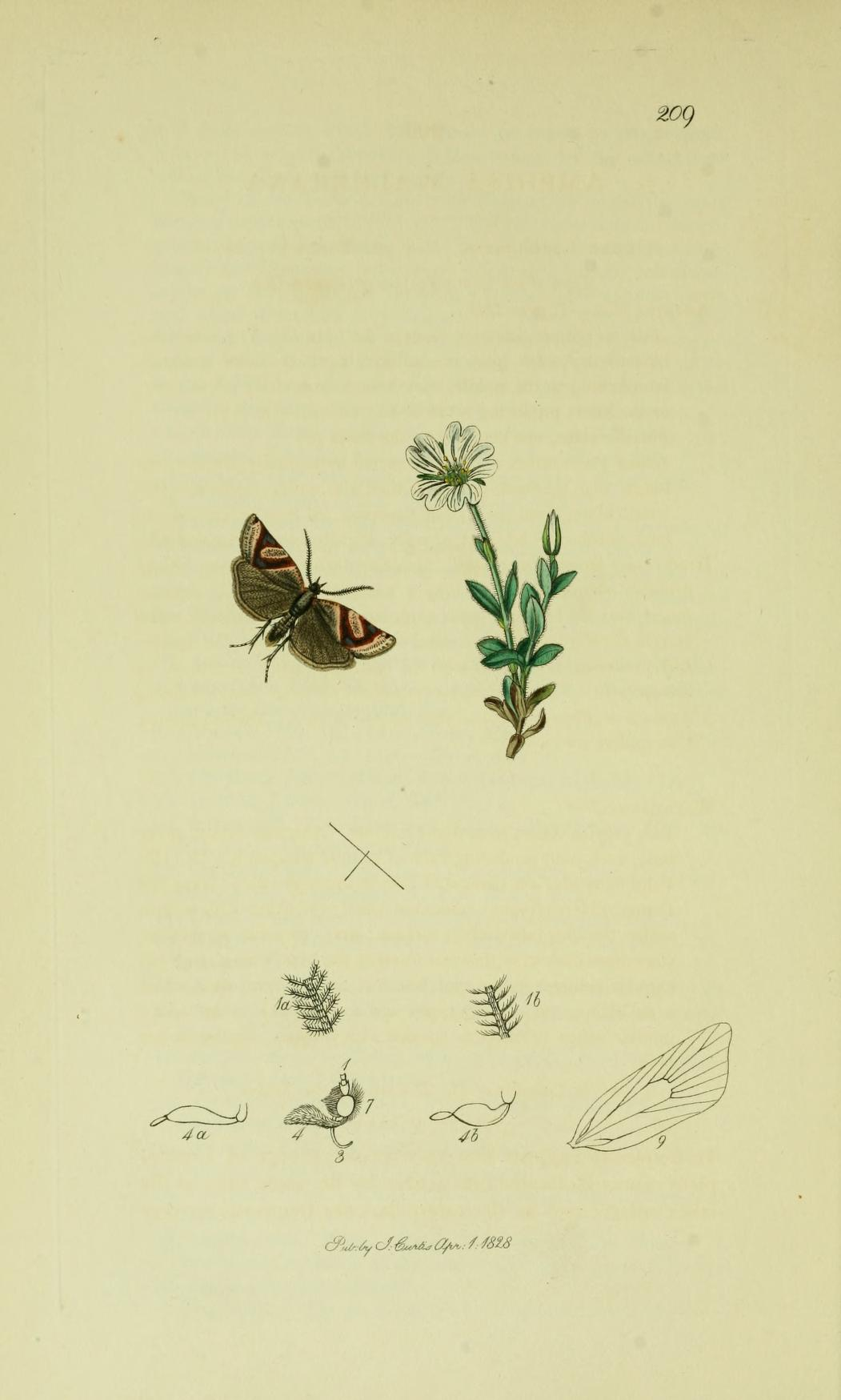
- Illustration from John Curtis's British Entomology Volume 6

Scientific classification
- Domain: Eukaryota
- Kingdom: Animalia
- Phylum: Arthropoda
- Class: Insecta
- Order: Lepidoptera
- Family: Tortricidae
- Genus: Philedonides
- Species: P. lunana

Binomial name
- Philedonides lunana (Thunberg, 1784)

Synonyms
- List: Tortrix lunana Thunberg & Borgstroem, 1784; Tortrix prodromana Hubner, 1828; Amphisa rungsi Lucas, 1954; Amphysa walkerana Curtis, 1828; Amphisa walkerana

= Philedonides lunana =

Species of moth

Philedonides lunana, also known as the heath tortrix and Walker’s Lanark tortrix, is a moth of the family Tortricidae. It was first described by Carl Peter Thunberg in 1784 and is found in most of Europe.

== Description ==
There is distinct sexual dimorphism. The wingspan is 12–16 mm. Adults are on wing from March to May. Males fly on calm, sunny days, especially at sunrise, midday and evening, while females sit on the top of vegetation, where pairing takes place. At other times the moths hide amongst dead leaves and are difficult to find.

Eggs are laid in March and April, in small batches on the leaves of coarse, moorland plants. Plants include bearberry (Arctostaphylos uva-ursi species in Ireland), silverweed (Argentina anserina), common mugwort (Artemisia vulgaris), heather (Calluna species), black knapweed (Centaurea nigra), scabiosa species, thistles (Cirsium species), wild carrot (Daucus carota), heath (Erica species), ash (Fraxinus excelsior), petty whin (Genista anglica), larch (Larix species), mint (Mentha species), bog-myrtle (Myrica gale), restharrow (Ononis fruticosa), milk-parsley (Peucedanum palustre), Sitka spruce (Picea sitchensis in Wales), lodgepole pine (Pinus contorta in Scotland and Wales), cinquefoils (Potentilla species), goat willow (Salix caprea), sea campion (Silene uniflora), alexanders (Smyrnium olusatrum), red clover (Trifolium pratense), Vaccinium species and valerians (Valeriana species). The larvae feed in spun or folded leaves and flowers in May and June. Pupa can be found from June to March, in spun leaves of the foodplant or in debris on the ground.

== Distribution ==
The heath tortrix is found in most of Europe (from Ireland to Russia), with some exceptions, such as the Balkans, France and Iberia. The moth has also been found in the Near East.

== Gallery ==
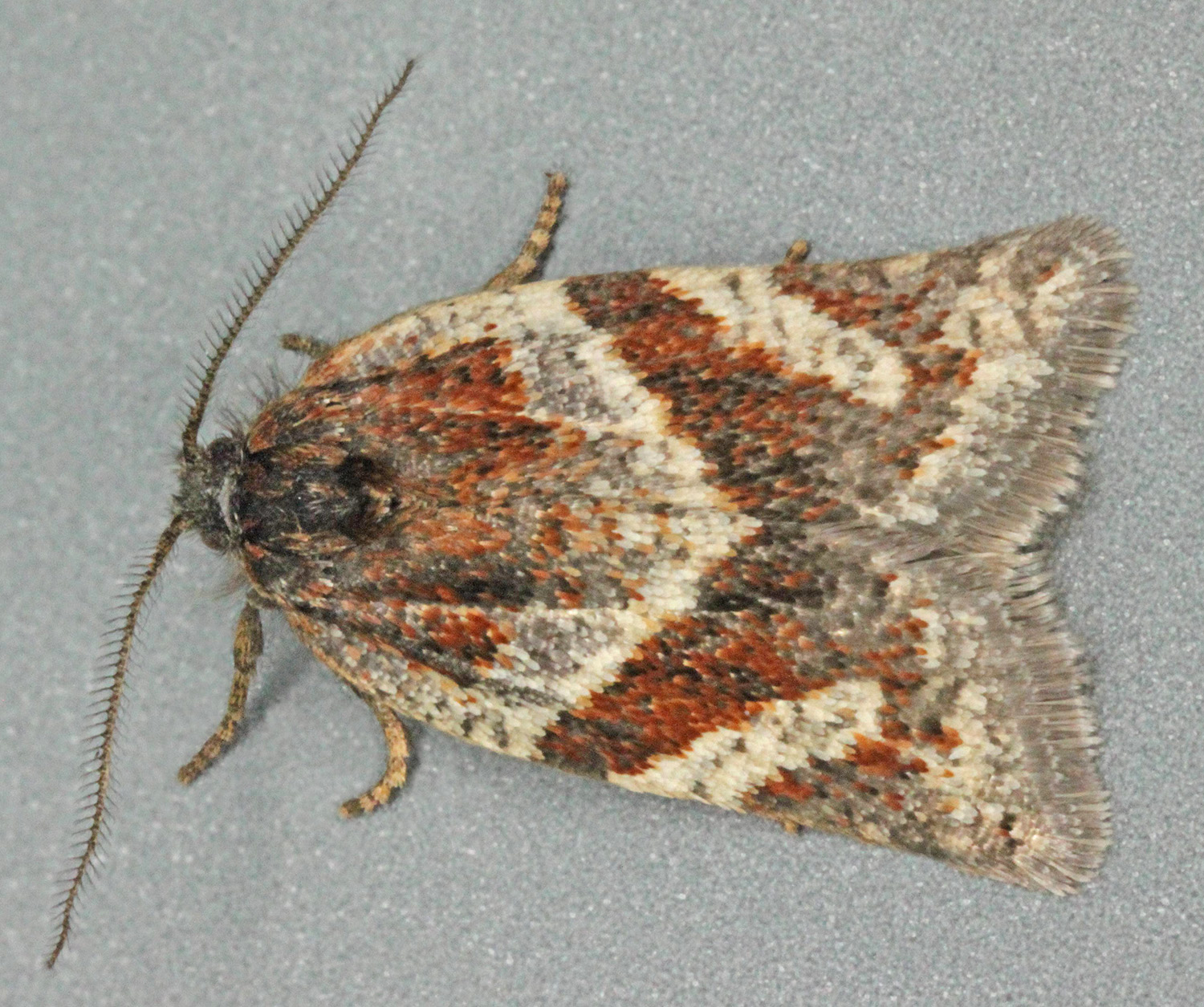

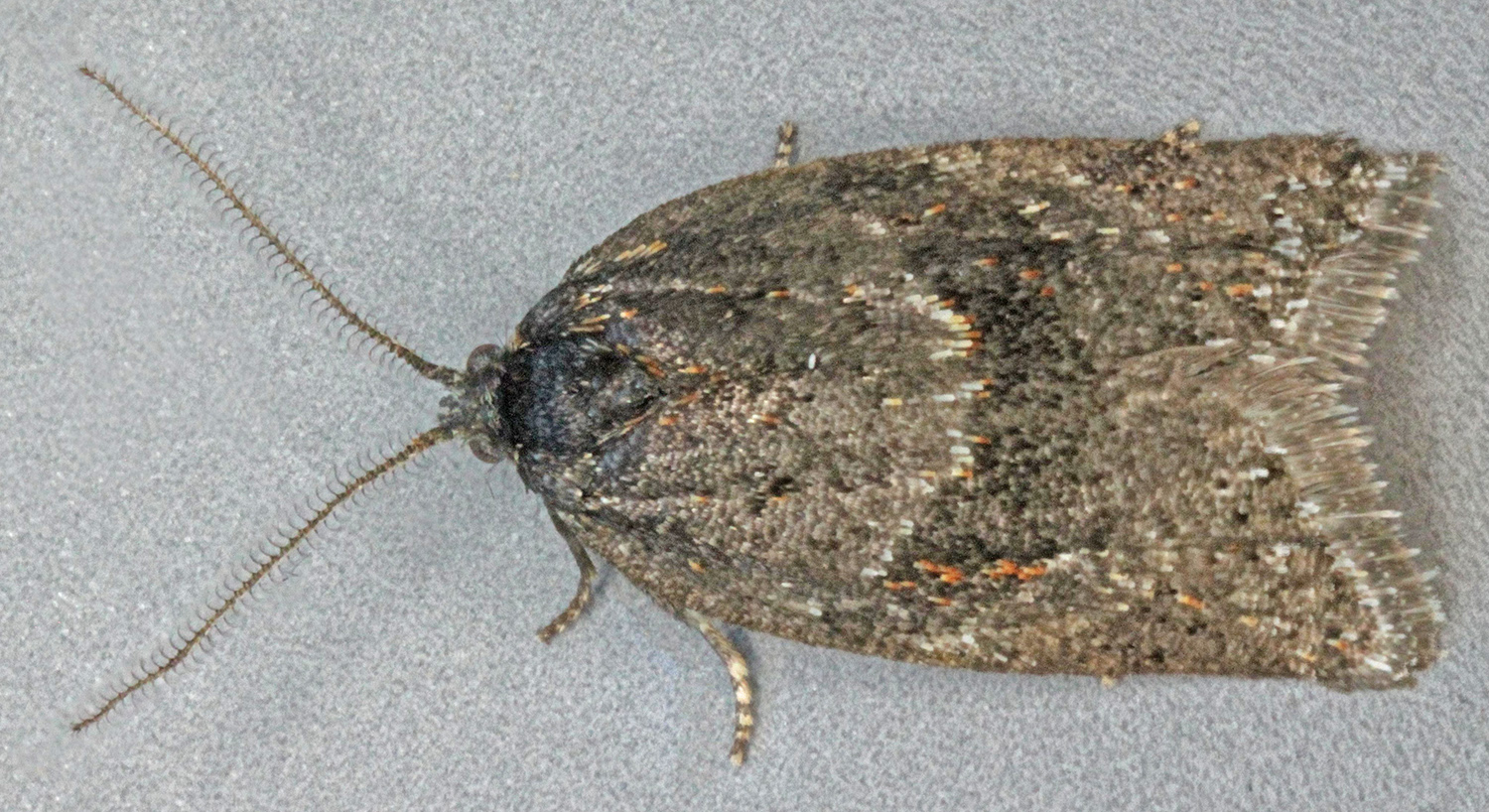

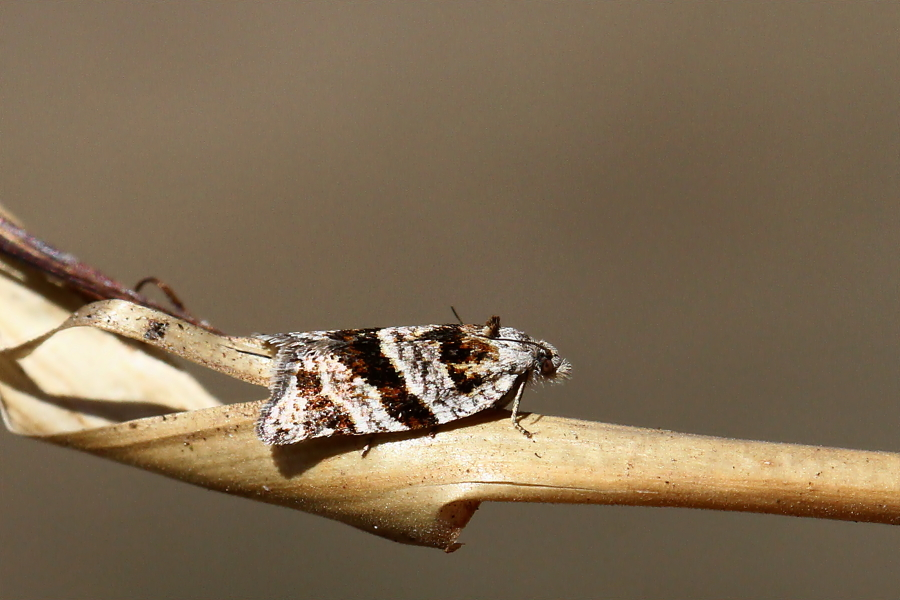
