= Mirificarma pallidipulchra =

Scientific classification
- Domain: Eukaryota
- Kingdom: Animalia
- Phylum: Arthropoda
- Class: Insecta
- Order: Lepidoptera
- Family: Gelechiidae
- Genus: Mirificarma
- Species: M. pallidipulchra

Binomial name
- Mirificarma pallidipulchra (Walsingham, 1904)

Synonyms
- Rhinosia pallidipulchra Walsingham, 1904; Rhinosia striolella Turati, 1924

Species of moth

Mirificarma pallidipulchra is a moth of the family Gelechiidae. It is found in Algeria, Tunisia and Libya.

The wingspan is 6.5-8.5 mm for males and 6.5–8 mm for females. Adults are on wing from March to May and in July.
