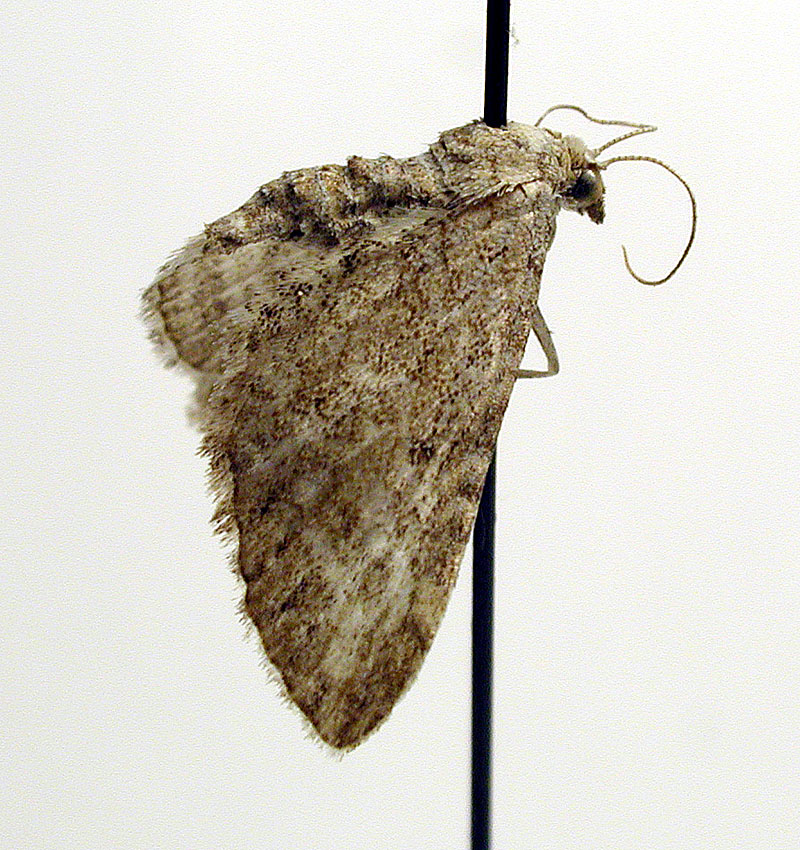

Scientific classification
- Domain: Eukaryota
- Kingdom: Animalia
- Phylum: Arthropoda
- Class: Insecta
- Order: Lepidoptera
- Family: Geometridae
- Genus: Eupithecia
- Species: E. millefoliata

Binomial name
- Eupithecia millefoliata Rössler, 1866

Synonyms
- Eupithecia maeoticaria Bohatsch, 1893; Eupithecia wettsteini Vojnits, 1974; Eupithecia achilleata Mabille 1869

= Eupithecia millefoliata =

Species of moth

Eupithecia millefoliata, the yarrow pug, is a moth of the family Geometridae. The species was first described by Adolph Rössler in 1866 and it can be found in Europe and Russia.

The wingspan is about 21 mm. The moths flies from June to July depending on the location.

The larvae feed on Achillea millefolium.
