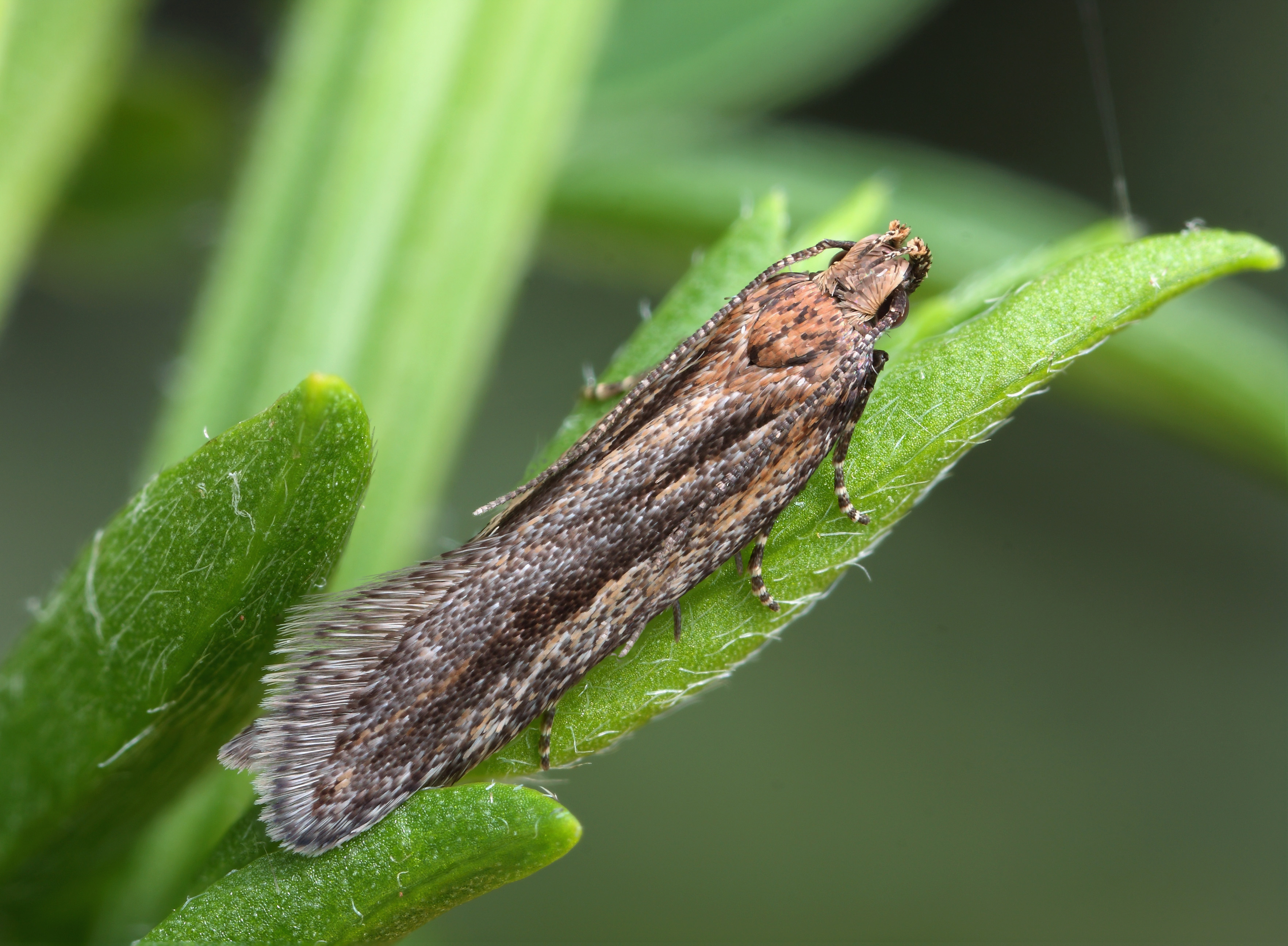

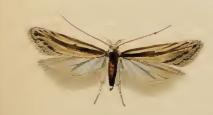

Scientific classification
- Kingdom: Animalia
- Phylum: Arthropoda
- Clade: Pancrustacea
- Class: Insecta
- Order: Lepidoptera
- Family: Gelechiidae
- Genus: Mirificarma
- Species: M. mulinella

Binomial name
- Mirificarma mulinella (Zeller, 1839)

Synonyms
- Gelechia mulinella Zeller, 1839; Gelechia caminariella Fuchs, 1902; Gelechia carminariella; Gelechia nigraesilvae Amsel, 1950

= Mirificarma mulinella =

Species of moth

Mirificarma mulinella is a moth of the family Gelechiidae. It is found in most of Europe, except Finland, the Baltic region and part of the Balkan Peninsula. It has also been recorded from North Africa.

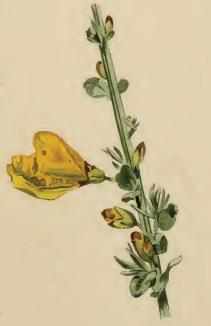
A sprig of broom with a flower attacked by larva

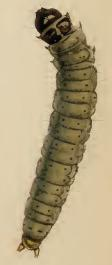
Larva

The wingspan is 6–7.5 mm for males and 5.5–7.5 mm for females. Terminal joint of palpi as long as second. Forewings pale ochreous, more or less irrorated with dark fuscous, more strongly on margins, and sometimes with whitish; usually a broad cloudy blackish-fuscous streak along fold to before middle, connected with another in disc from 1/3 to apex; above these a pale subcostal streak; stigmata blackish, usually concealed in the dark streaks. Hindwings very pale grey. Larva dull green; dots black; head black; plate of 2 black, with central white line.

Adults are on wing from July to November in Europe, but have also been recorded in February in North Africa.

The larvae feed on the flowers of Ulex europaeus, Cytisus scoparius, Cytisus nigricans, Genista germanica, Lupinus arboreus and Calicotome spinosa.
