= Mirificarma scissella =

Scientific classification
- Domain: Eukaryota
- Kingdom: Animalia
- Phylum: Arthropoda
- Class: Insecta
- Order: Lepidoptera
- Family: Gelechiidae
- Genus: Mirificarma
- Species: M. scissella

Binomial name
- Mirificarma scissella (Chrétien, 1915)

Synonyms
- Gelechia scissella Chretien, 1915

Species of moth

Mirificarma scissella is a moth of the family Gelechiidae. It is found in Algeria.

The wingspan is 7-7.5 mm for males. Adults are on wing in April and May.
