= Mirificarma cabezella =

Scientific classification
- Domain: Eukaryota
- Kingdom: Animalia
- Phylum: Arthropoda
- Class: Insecta
- Order: Lepidoptera
- Family: Gelechiidae
- Genus: Mirificarma
- Species: M. cabezella

Binomial name
- Mirificarma cabezella (Chrétien, 1925)

Synonyms
- Gelechia cabezella Chretien, 1925

Species of moth

Mirificarma cabezella is a moth of the family Gelechiidae. It is found in Portugal, Spain and Morocco.

The wingspan is 6.5-7.5 mm for males and 6.5–7 mm for females. Adults are on wing from August to October.

The larvae feed on Adenocarpus hispanicus. They feed from within the shoots. Larvae can be found in June.
