= Mirificarma montivaga =

Scientific classification
- Domain: Eukaryota
- Kingdom: Animalia
- Phylum: Arthropoda
- Class: Insecta
- Order: Lepidoptera
- Family: Gelechiidae
- Genus: Mirificarma
- Species: M. montivaga

Binomial name
- Mirificarma montivaga (Walsingham, 1904)

Synonyms
- Gelechia montivaga Walsingham, 1904; Gelechia pulverosella Zerny, 1936

Species of moth

Mirificarma montivaga is a moth of the family Gelechiidae. It is found in Morocco and Algeria. Adults are on wing from May to July.
