= Mirificarma aflavella =

Scientific classification
- Domain: Eukaryota
- Kingdom: Animalia
- Phylum: Arthropoda
- Class: Insecta
- Order: Lepidoptera
- Family: Gelechiidae
- Genus: Mirificarma
- Species: M. aflavella

Binomial name
- Mirificarma aflavella (Amsel, 1935)

Synonyms
- Rhinosia aflavella Amsel, 1935

Species of moth

Mirificarma aflavella is a moth of the family Gelechiidae. It is found in Greece (Rodhos), Turkey and Israel.
