= Mirificarma pederskoui =

Scientific classification
- Kingdom: Animalia
- Phylum: Arthropoda
- Clade: Pancrustacea
- Class: Insecta
- Order: Lepidoptera
- Family: Gelechiidae
- Genus: Mirificarma
- Species: M. pederskoui

Binomial name
- Mirificarma pederskoui Huemer & Karsholt, 1999

Species of moth

Mirificarma pederskoui is a moth of the family Gelechiidae. It was described by Peter Huemer and Ole Karsholt in 1999. It is found in southern Spain.
