= Mirificarma denotata =

Scientific classification
- Domain: Eukaryota
- Kingdom: Animalia
- Phylum: Arthropoda
- Class: Insecta
- Order: Lepidoptera
- Family: Gelechiidae
- Genus: Mirificarma
- Species: M. denotata

Binomial name
- Mirificarma denotata Pitkin, 1984

Species of moth

Mirificarma denotata is a moth of the family Gelechiidae. It is found in Morocco, Portugal and Spain.

The wingspan is 7.5-8.5 mm for males and 7–8 mm for females. Adults have been recorded from late April to May.

The larvae feed on Astragalus lusitanicus.
