= Mirificarma constricta =

Scientific classification
- Domain: Eukaryota
- Kingdom: Animalia
- Phylum: Arthropoda
- Class: Insecta
- Order: Lepidoptera
- Family: Gelechiidae
- Genus: Mirificarma
- Species: M. constricta

Binomial name
- Mirificarma constricta Pitkin, 1984

Species of moth

Mirificarma constricta is a moth of the family Gelechiidae. It is found in northern Morocco.

The wingspan is 5.5–6.0 mm (0.22–0.24 in) for males. Adults are on wing in August and October.
