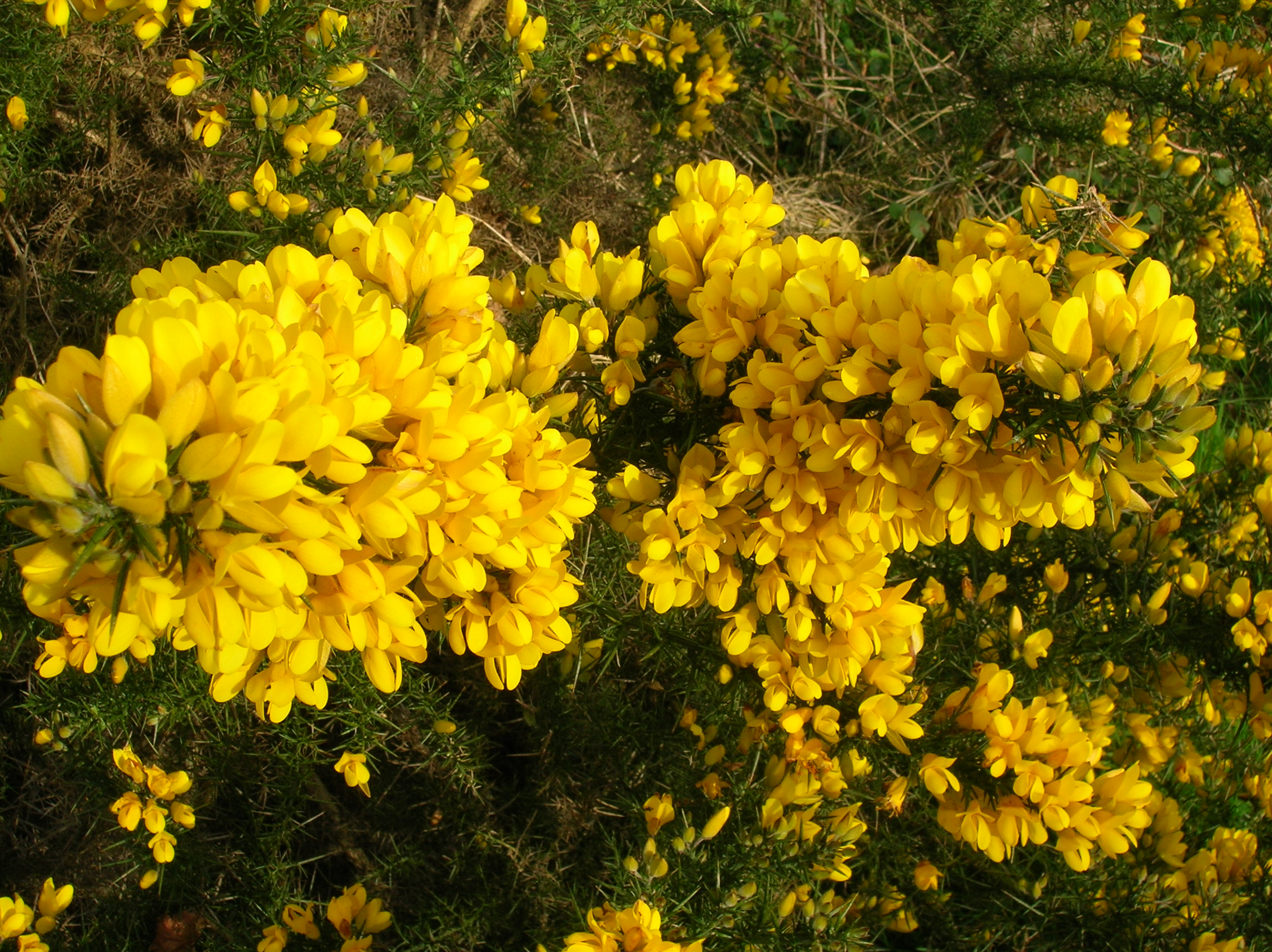
- Gorse in full flower at Dalgarven Mill in Scotland

Scientific classification
- Kingdom: Plantae
- Clade: Embryophytes
- Clade: Tracheophytes
- Clade: Angiosperms
- Clade: Eudicots
- Clade: Rosids
- Order: Fabales
- Family: Fabaceae
- Subfamily: Faboideae
- Tribe: Genisteae
- Genus: Ulex; L.

Species
- 11–58; see text

Synonyms
- Genista-spartium Duhamel (1755)

= Ulex =

Genus of flowering plant in the legume family

Ulex (commonly known as gorse, furze, or whin) is a genus of flowering plants in the family Fabaceae. The genus comprises about twenty species of thorny evergreen shrubs in the subfamily Faboideae of the pea family Fabaceae. The species are native to parts of western Europe and northwest Africa, with the majority of species in Iberia.

Gorse is closely related to the brooms, and like them, it has green stems and very small leaves, and is adapted to dry growing conditions. However, it differs from the brooms in its extreme thorniness, the shoots being modified into branched thorns 1–4 centimetres (0.4–1.6 inches) long, which almost wholly replace the leaves as the plant's functioning photosynthetic organs. The leaves of young plants are trifoliate, but in mature plants, they are reduced to scales or small spines. All the species have yellow flowers, generally showy, some with a very long flowering season.

== Species ==
The greatest diversity of Ulex species is found in the Atlantic portion of the Iberian Peninsula, and most species have narrow distribution ranges. The most widespread species is the common gorse (Ulex europaeus): it is the only species native to much of western Europe, where it grows in sunny sites and usually on dry, sandy soils. It is also the largest species, reaching 2–3 m (7–10 ft) in height; this compares with typically 20–40 cm (8–16 in) heights for the western gorse (Ulex gallii). This latter species is characteristic of highly exposed Atlantic coastal heathland and montane habitats. In the eastern part of Great Britain, the dwarf furze (Ulex minor) replaces the western gorse. Ulex minor grows to a height of approximately 30 cm (12 in), a habit characteristic of sandy lowland heathlands.

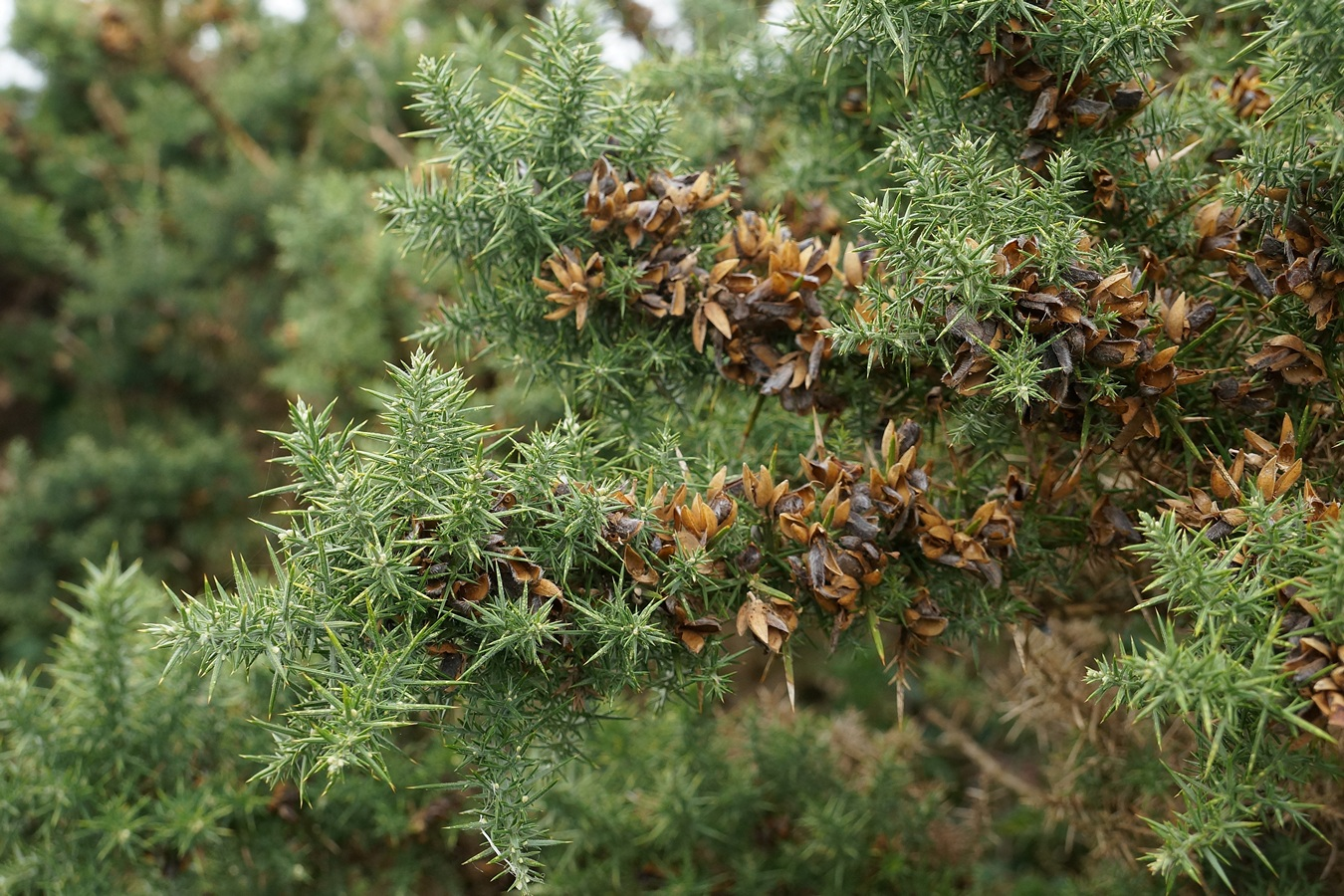
Fruiting at Mallaig, Scotland

Common gorse flowers a little in late autumn and through the winter, coming into flower most strongly in spring. Western gorse and dwarf furze flower in late summer (August–September in Ireland and Great Britain). Between the different species, some gorse is nearly always in flower, hence the old country saying: "When gorse is out of blossom, kissing's out of fashion". Gorse flowers have a distinctive coconut-like scent, experienced very strongly by some individuals but only weakly by others.

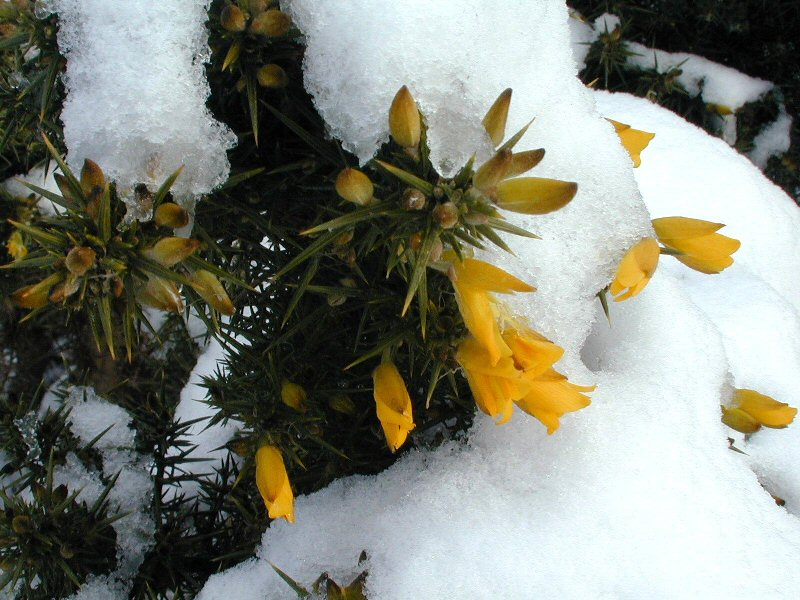
Ulex europaeus

=== Species list ===
The genus comprises the following species:

- Ulex argenteus Webb
  - subsp. argenteus Webb
  - subsp. subsericeus (Cout.) Rothm.
- Ulex australis Clemente
  - subsp. australis
  - subsp. welwitschianus (Planch.) Esp.Santo, Cubas, Lousã, C.Pardo & J.C.Costa
- Ulex baeticus Boiss.
  - subsp. baeticus
  - subsp. scaber (Kunze) Cubas
- Ulex borgiae Rivas Mart.
- Ulex canescens Lange
- Ulex cantabricus Alvarez & al.
- Ulex densus Webb
- Ulex erinaceus Welw. ex Webb
- Ulex eriocladus C.Vicioso
- Ulex europaeus L.—common gorse
  - subsp. europaeus
  - subsp. latebracteatus (Mariz) Rothm.
- Ulex gallii Planch.—western gorse or western furze
- Ulex jussiaei Webb
- Ulex micranthus Lange
- Ulex minor Roth—dwarf furze or dwarf gorse
- Ulex parviflorus Pourr.
  - subsp. africanus (Webb) Greuter
  - subsp. airensis (Esp.Santo, Cubas, Lousã, C.Pardo & J.C.Costa) Rivas Mart.
  - subsp. parviflorus Pourr.
  - subsp. rivasgodayanus Cubas

The number of species is likely higher, as many subspecies are not closely related to one another or have large differences in ploidy.

=== Species names with uncertain taxonomic status ===
The status of the following species is unresolved:

- Ulex eriophorus Gand.
- Ulex spicatus Gand.

=== Hybrids ===
The following hybrids have been described:

- Ulex ×breoganii (Castrov. & Valdés Berm.) Castrov. & Valdés Berm. (U. europaeus × U. gallii)
- Ulex ×dalilae Capelo, J.C.Costa & Lousã (U. densus × U. jussiaei)
- Ulex ×lagrezii Rouy (U. europaeus × U. minor)

== Ecology ==
Gorse may grow as a fire-climax plant, well adapted to encourage and withstand fires, being highly flammable and having seed pods that are, to a large extent, opened by fire: thus allowing rapid regeneration after fire. The burnt stumps will readily sprout new growth from the roots. Where fire is excluded, gorse soon tends to be shaded out by taller-growing trees, unless other factors, such as exposure, also apply. Typical fire recurrence periods in gorse-stands are 5–20 years.

Gorse thrives in poor growing areas and conditions, including drought; it is sometimes found on very rocky soils, where many species cannot thrive. Moreover, it is widely used for land reclamation (e.g. mine tailings), where its nitrogen-fixing capacity helps other plants establish better.

Gorse is a valuable plant for wildlife, providing dense, thorny cover that's ideal for protecting bird nests. In Britain, France and Ireland, it is particularly noted for supporting Dartford warblers (Sylvia undata) and European stonechats (Saxicola rubicola); the common name of the whinchat (Saxicola rubetra) attests to its close association with gorse. The flowers are sometimes eaten by the caterpillars of the double-striped pug moth (Gymnoscelis rufifasciata), whilst those of the case-bearer moth Coleophora albicosta feed exclusively on gorse. The dry wood of dead gorse stems provides food for the caterpillars of the concealer moth Batia lambdella.

== Invasive species ==
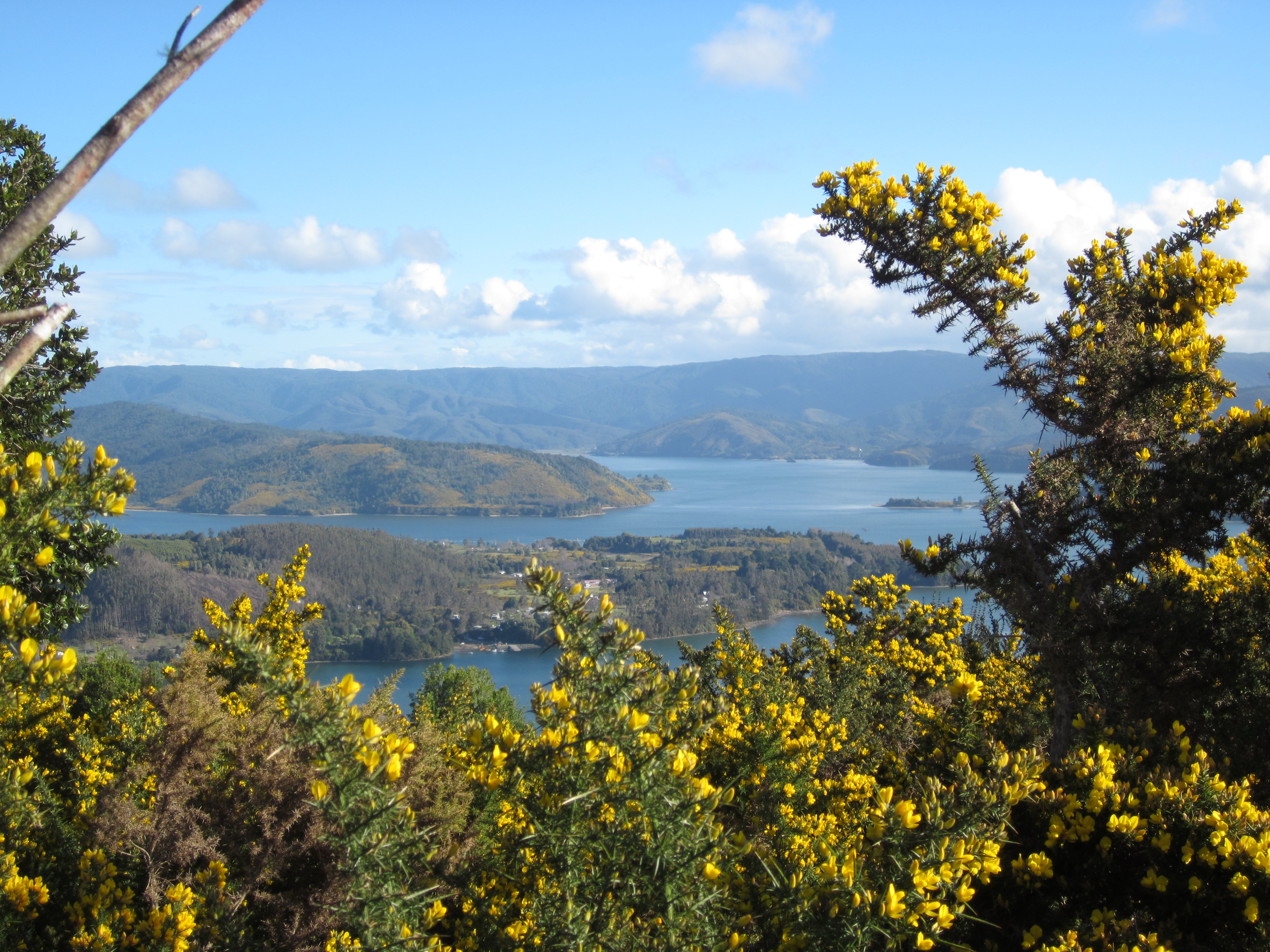
Ulex landscape around Corral Bay in Southern Chile

In many areas of North America (notably California and Oregon), southern South America, Australia, New Zealand, the Falkland Islands, and Hawaii, the common gorse—originally introduced as an ornamental plant or hedge—has become an invasive species owing to its aggressive seed dispersal; it has proved very difficult to eradicate and detrimental to native habitats. Common gorse is also an invasive species in the montane grasslands of Horton Plains National Park in Sri Lanka.

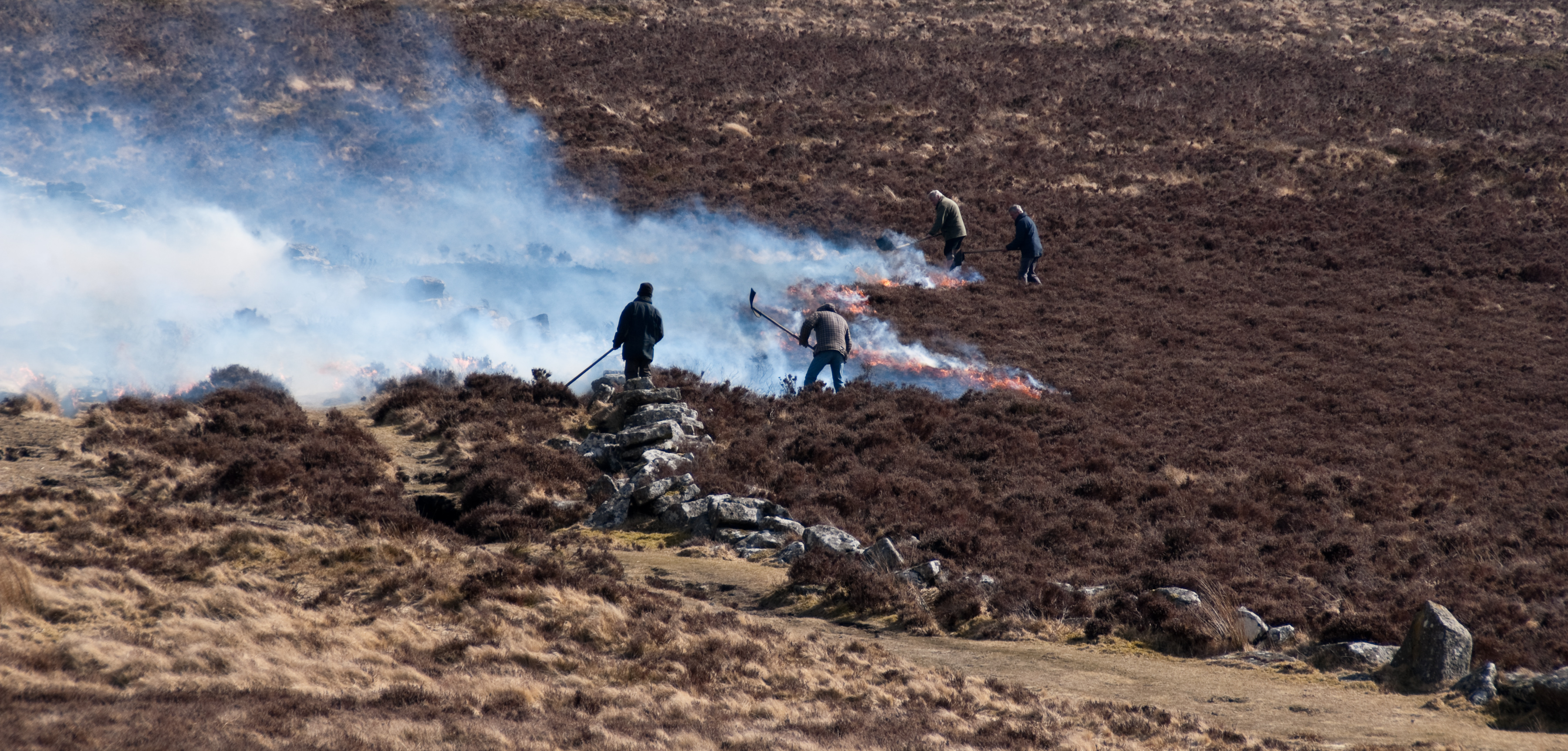
Controlled burning of gorse in Devon, England

== Management ==
Gorse readily becomes a dominant plant in suitable conditions. Where this is undesirable for agricultural or ecological reasons, control is required either to remove gorse completely, or to limit its extent. Gorse-stands are often managed by regular burning or flailing, allowing them to regrow from stumps or seed. Denser areas of gorse may be bulldozed.

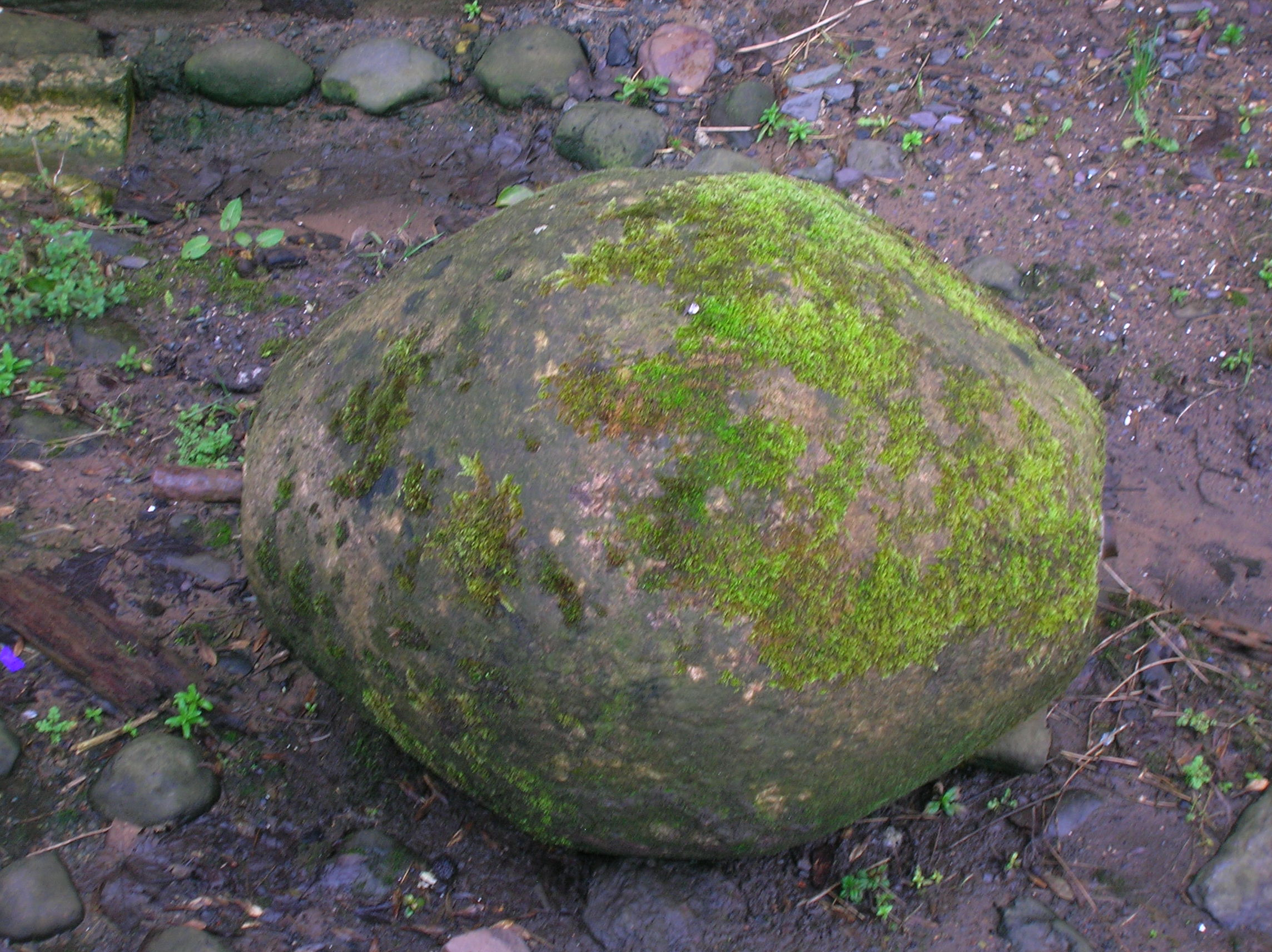
A whin-stone at Dalgarven Mill, Scotland, used to crush whin for use as winter feed for cattle

== Uses ==
=== Foods ===
Gorse flowers are edible and can be used in salads, teas and to make a non-grape-based fruit wine.

As fodder, gorse is high in protein and may be used as feed for livestock, particularly in winter, when other greenstuff is not available. Traditionally, it was used as fodder for horses and cattle, being made palatable either by bruising (crushing) with hand-held mallets, grinding it to a moss-like consistency with hand- or water-driven mills, or being finely chopped and mixed with straw chaff. Gorse is also eaten as forage by some livestock, such as feral ponies, which may eat little else in winter. Ponies may also eat the thinner stems of burnt gorse.

=== Fuel ===
Gorse-bushes are highly flammable; in many areas, bundles of gorse were used to fire traditional bread ovens.

On the island of Guernsey, Channel Islands, many traditional farms had furze brakes. The prolific gorse and bracken would be cut, dried and stored to be used as fuel, with farmhouses having purpose-built furze (clome or cloam) ovens.

=== Wood ===
Gorse wood has been used to make small objects; being non-toxic, it is especially suited for cutlery. In spite of its durability, it is not used for construction because the plant is too small and its wood is unstable, being prone to warping. Gorse is useful for garden ornaments, because it is resistant to weather and rot.

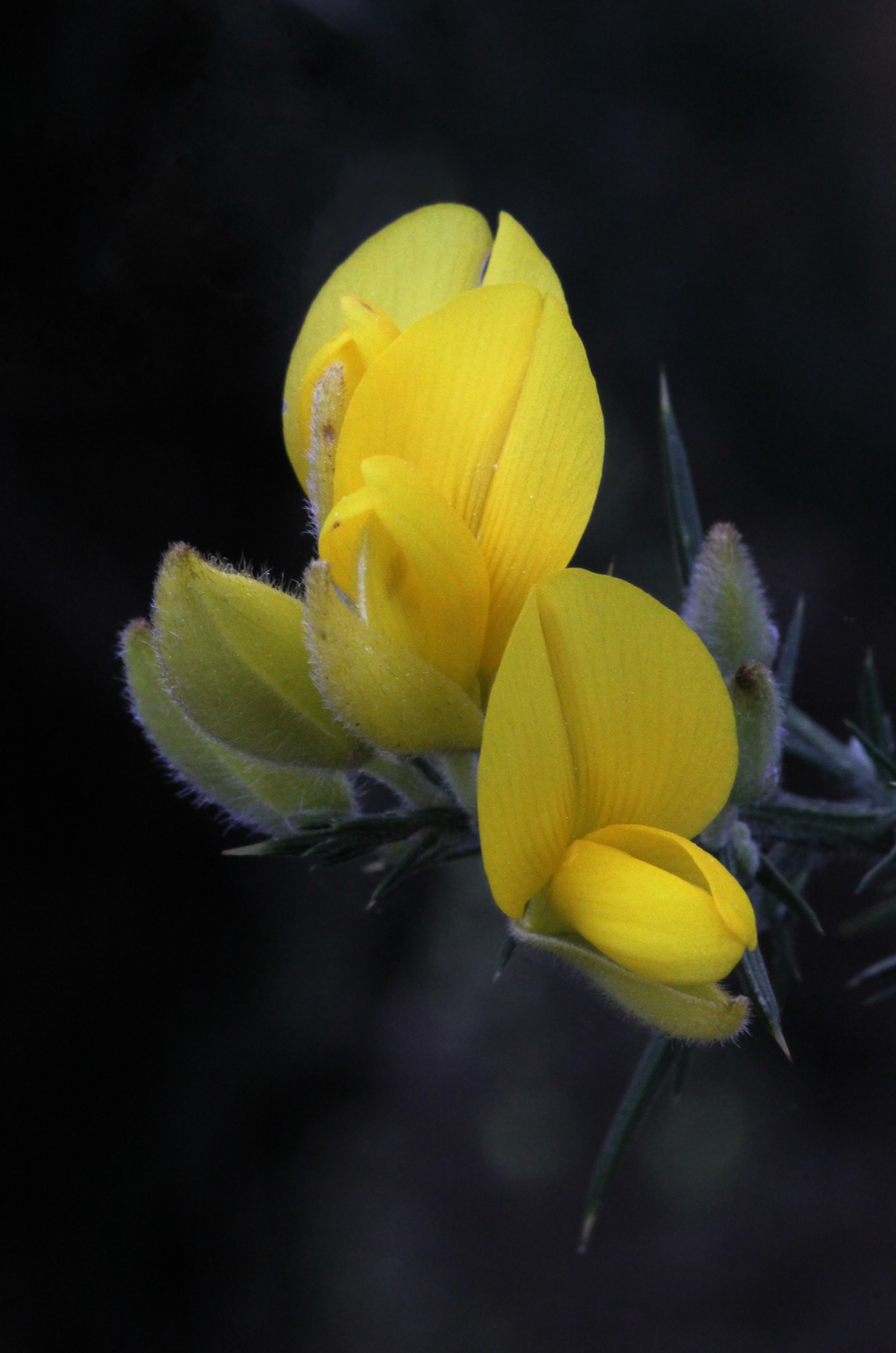
Common gorse flowers

=== Alternative medicine ===
Gorse has been listed as one of the 38 plants that are used to prepare Bach flower remedies, a kind of alternative medicine.

== Gorse-based symbols ==
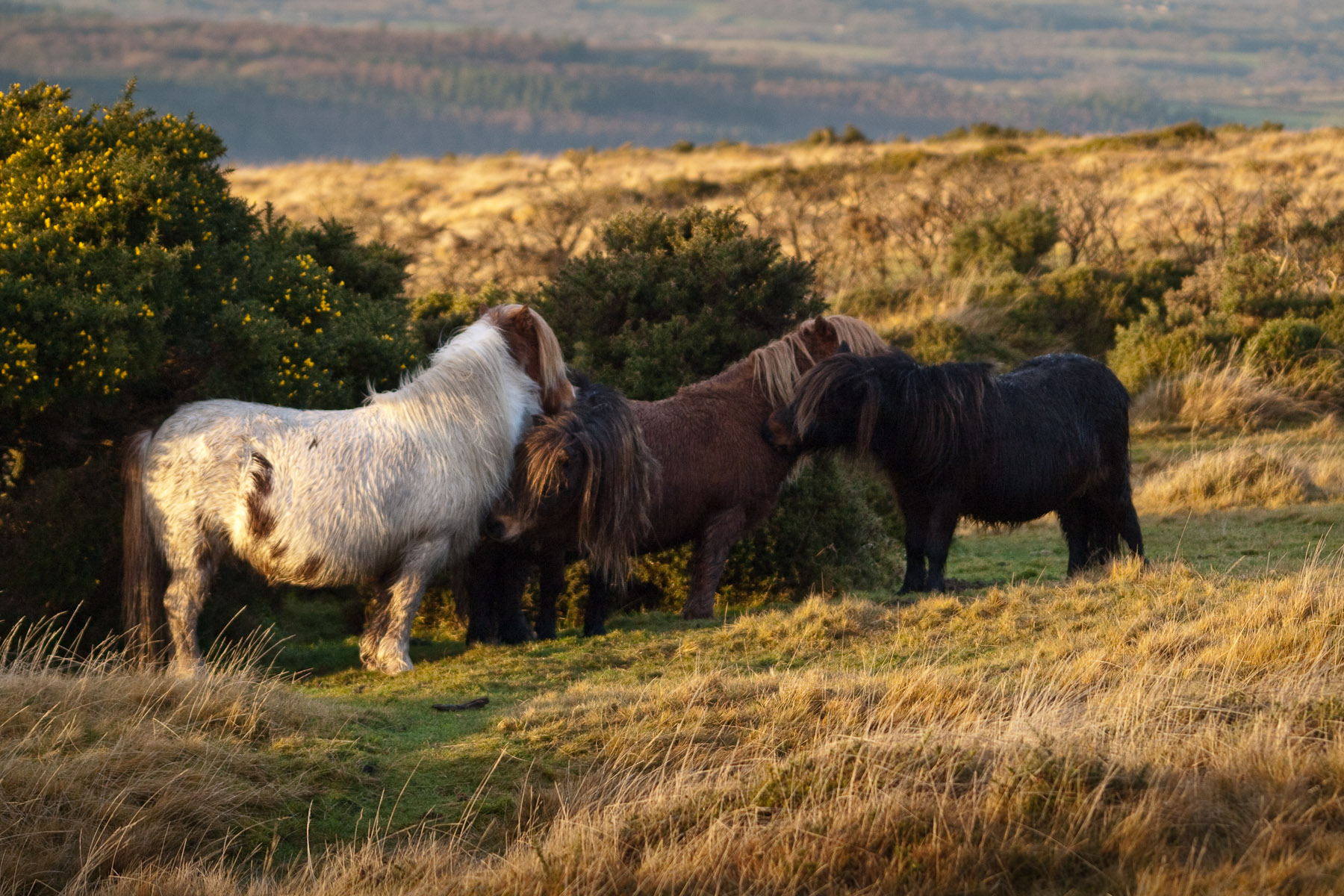
Dartmoor ponies sheltering behind furze

The furze is the badge of the Sinclair and MacLennan clans of Scotland. The flower, known as chorima in the Galician language, is the national flower of Galicia in northwest Spain.

The gorse is also the emblem of Brittany and is regaining popularity in Cornwall, particularly on St Piran's Day.

== In popular culture ==
The flammability of gorse rendered it a symbol for things that were quick to catch fire and burn out; for example, Arthur Conan Doyle, in his book Sir Nigel, has Sir John Chandos say: "They flare up like a furzebush in the flames, but if for a short space you may abide the heat of it, then there is a chance that it may be cooler ... If the Welsh be like the furze fire, then, pardieu! the Scotch are the peat, for they will smolder and you will never come to the end of them."

In many parts of Britain, especially Devon and Cornwall, where it is particularly prevalent on the moors, the expression "kissing's out of fashion when the gorse is out of blossom" is a traditional jest, as common gorse is thought to be always in bloom. Sprigs of gorse—or rather, furze, as it was usually known in the West Country—were a traditional gift between young lovers on May Day, when the blossom is at its peak.
