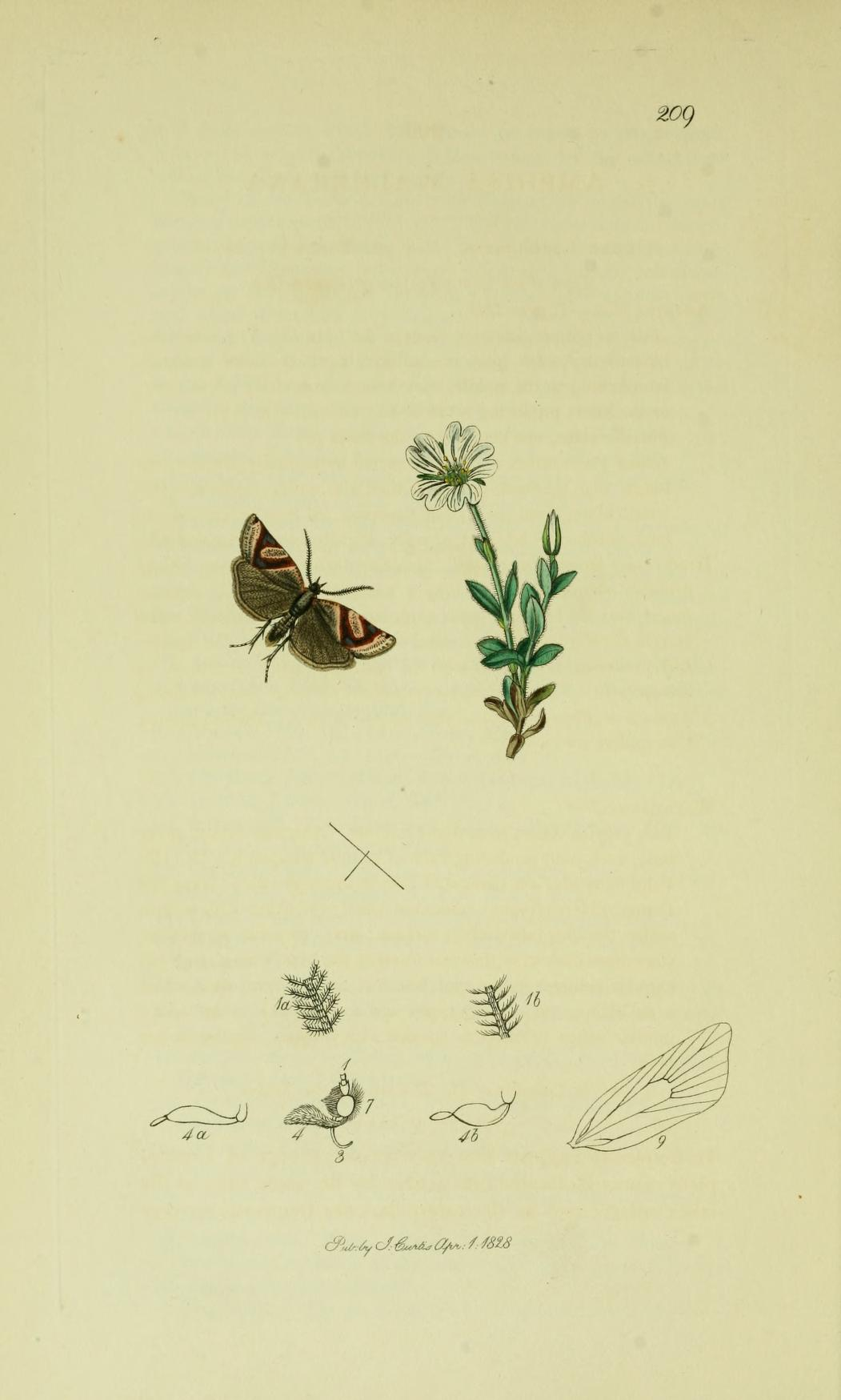
- An illustration from British Entomology by John Curtis. Lepidoptera: Amphisa walkerana or Philedonides lunana

Scientific classification
- Domain: Eukaryota
- Kingdom: Animalia
- Phylum: Arthropoda
- Class: Insecta
- Order: Lepidoptera
- Family: Tortricidae
- Tribe: Archipini
- Genus: Philedonides; Obraztsov, 1954

Synonyms
- Philendonoides Razowski, 1969

= Philedonides =

Genus of tortrix moths

Philedonides is a genus of moths belonging to the subfamily Tortricinae of the family Tortricidae.

== Species ==
- Philedonides lunana (Thunberg & Borgström, 1784)
- Philedonides rhombicana (Herrich-Schäffer, 1851)
- Philedonides seeboldiana (Rössler, 1877)

== See also ==
- List of Tortricidae genera
