= Mirificarma burdonella =

Scientific classification
- Domain: Eukaryota
- Kingdom: Animalia
- Phylum: Arthropoda
- Class: Insecta
- Order: Lepidoptera
- Family: Gelechiidae
- Genus: Mirificarma
- Species: M. burdonella

Binomial name
- Mirificarma burdonella (Rebel, 1930)

Synonyms
- Gelechia burdonella Rebel, 1930

Species of moth

Mirificarma burdonella is a moth of the family Gelechiidae. It is found on Corsica and Sardinia.

The wingspan is 5.5-6.5 mm for males and 5.5–6 mm for females. Adults are on wing from August to September.
