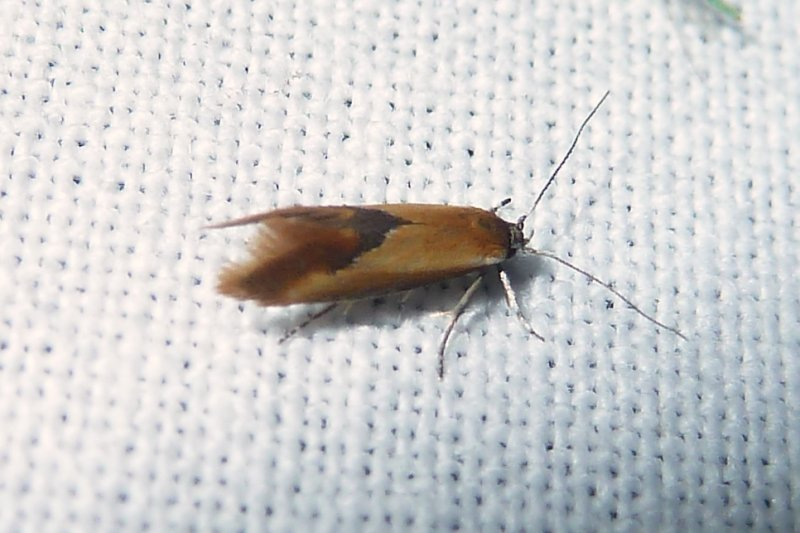

Scientific classification
- Domain: Eukaryota
- Kingdom: Animalia
- Phylum: Arthropoda
- Class: Insecta
- Order: Lepidoptera
- Family: Oecophoridae
- Genus: Batia
- Species: B. internella

Binomial name
- Batia internella Jackh, 1972

= Batia internella =

Species of moth

Batia internella is a species of moth belonging to the family Oecophoridae.

It is native to Europe.
