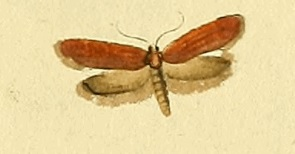

Scientific classification
- Domain: Eukaryota
- Kingdom: Animalia
- Phylum: Arthropoda
- Class: Insecta
- Order: Lepidoptera
- Family: Oecophoridae
- Genus: Crassa
- Species: C. tinctella

Binomial name
- Crassa tinctella (Hübner, 1796)

Synonyms
- Tinea tinctella Hübner, 1796

= Crassa tinctella =

Species of moth

Crassa tinctella, the tinted tubic, is a moth of the family Oecophoridae. It was described by Jacob Hübner in 1796. It is found in most of Europe, except Ireland, the Iberian Peninsula and most of the Balkan Peninsula.

The wingspan is 10–12 mm. Adults are ochreous-orange in colour. Adults are on wing from May to June.
