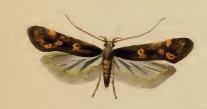
- Mirificarma lentiginosella

Scientific classification
- Kingdom: Animalia
- Phylum: Arthropoda
- Clade: Pancrustacea
- Class: Insecta
- Order: Lepidoptera
- Family: Gelechiidae
- Tribe: Gelechiini
- Genus: Mirificarma; Gozmány, 1955

Synonyms
- Helina Guenee, 1849 (preocc.)

= Mirificarma =

Genus of moths

Mirificarma is a genus of moths in the family Gelechiidae.

== Species ==
- montivaga species-group
  - Mirificarma montivaga (Walsingham, 1904)
- maculatella species-group
  - Mirificarma aflavella (Amsel, 1935)
  - Mirificarma denotata Pitkin, 1984
  - Mirificarma eburnella (Denis & Schiffermuller, 1775)
  - Mirificarma flavella (Duponchel, 1844)
  - Mirificarma maculatella (Hübner, 1796)
  - Mirificarma minimella Huemer & Karsholt, 2001
  - Mirificarma pallidipulchra (Walsingham, 1904)
  - Mirificarma rhodoptera (Mann, 1866)
  - Mirificarma scissella (Chretien, 1915)
- interruptella species-group
  - Mirificarma burdonella (Rebel, 1930)
  - Mirificarma cabezella (Chretien, 1925)
  - Mirificarma constricta Pitkin, 1984
  - Mirificarma cytisella (Treitschke, 1833)
  - Mirificarma fasciata Pitkin, 1984
  - Mirificarma flavonigrella (Chretien, 1915)
  - Mirificarma interrupta (Curtis, 1827)
  - Mirificarma lentiginosella (Zeller, 1839)
  - Mirificarma monticolella (Rebel, 1931)
  - Mirificarma mulinella (Zeller, 1839)
  - Mirificarma ocellinella (Chretien, 1915)
  - Mirificarma pederskoui Huemer & Karsholt, 1999
  - Mirificarma ulicinella (Staudinger, 1859)

== Status unclear ==
- Mirificarma obscurella (Hübner, [1817]), described as Tinea obscurella (preocc.)
