= Mirificarma flavella =

Scientific classification
- Domain: Eukaryota
- Kingdom: Animalia
- Phylum: Arthropoda
- Class: Insecta
- Order: Lepidoptera
- Family: Gelechiidae
- Genus: Mirificarma
- Species: M. flavella

Binomial name
- Mirificarma flavella (Duponchel, 1844)

Synonyms
- Acompsia flavella Duponchel, 1844; Gelechia segetella Zeller, 1847

Species of moth

Mirificarma flavella is a moth of the family Gelechiidae. It is found in Spain, France, Corsica, Italy, Sardinia, Sicily, Serbia and Montenegro, Greece, Crete, Cyprus, Algeria and Tunisia.

The wingspan is 7–9 mm for males and 7.5–9 mm for females. Adults have been recorded from April to July.

The larvae feed on Trifolium pratense and Lotus corniculatus. Larvae can be found in May and June.
