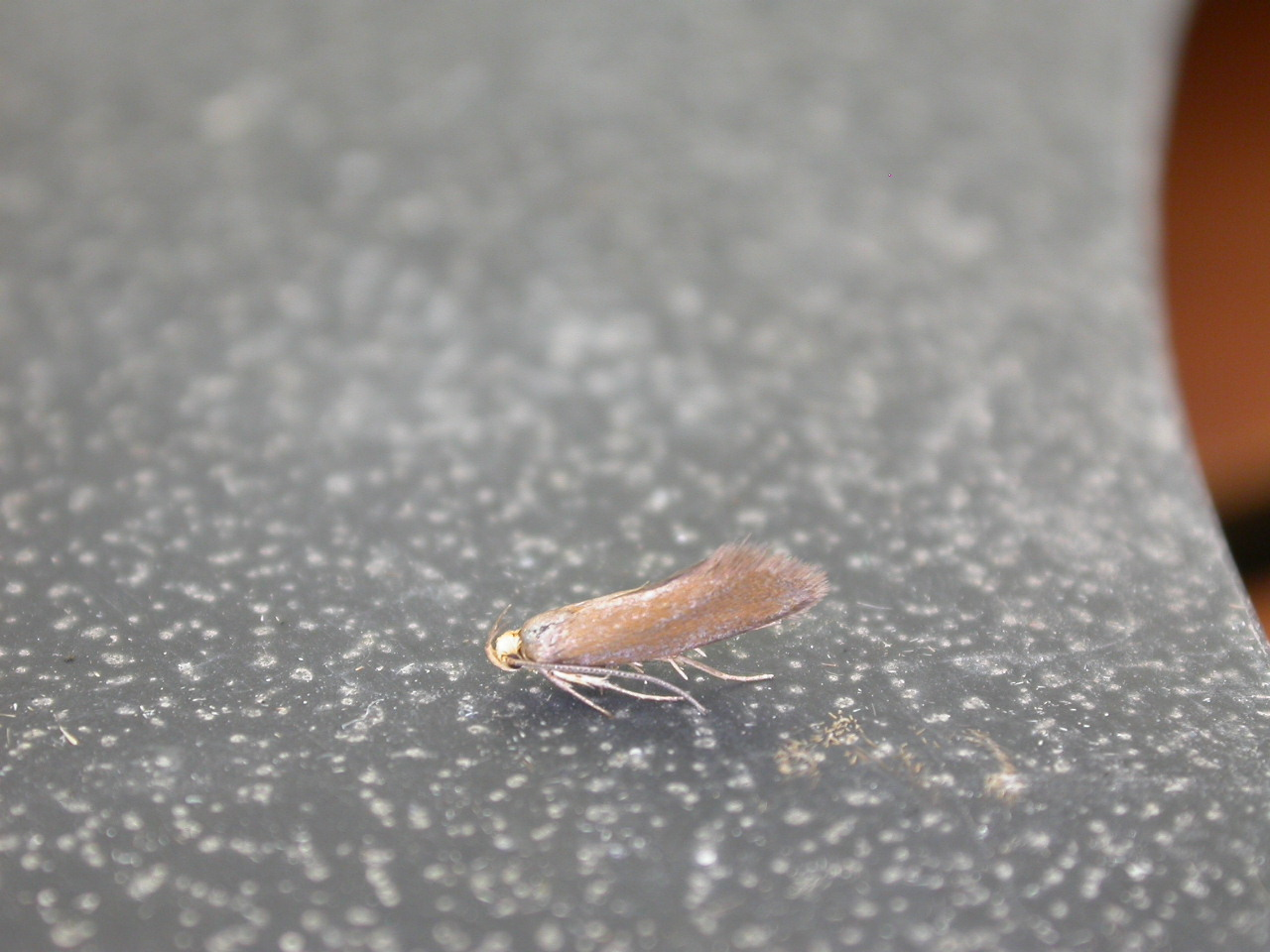
- Crassa unitella

Scientific classification
- Kingdom: Animalia
- Phylum: Arthropoda
- Clade: Pancrustacea
- Class: Insecta
- Order: Lepidoptera
- Family: Oecophoridae
- Subfamily: Oecophorinae
- Genus: Crassa; Bruand, 1851

Type species
- Tinea tinctella Hübner, 1796

Synonyms
- Tichonia (auct. non Hübner, 1825: misidentification)

= Crassa =

Genus of moths

Crassa is a genus of the concealer moth family (Oecophoridae). Among these, it belongs to subfamily Oecophorinae. The genus name Tichonia, established by J. Hübner in 1825, was frequently misapplied to these moths by earlier authors. But as the type species of Hübner's genus is the greenweed flat-body moth – originally described as Tinea atomella, but nowadays called Agonopterix atomella –, Tichonia is actually a junior synonym of Agonopterix. That genus does belong to the same superfamily (the Gelechioidea) as Crassa, but is placed in the concealer moth subfamily Depressariinae which is sometimes treated as distinct family.

Species of Crassa include:

- Crassa tinctella (Hübner, 1796)
- Crassa unitella (Hübner, 1796)
