= Mirificarma flavonigrella =

Scientific classification
- Domain: Eukaryota
- Kingdom: Animalia
- Phylum: Arthropoda
- Class: Insecta
- Order: Lepidoptera
- Family: Gelechiidae
- Genus: Mirificarma
- Species: M. flavonigrella

Binomial name
- Mirificarma flavonigrella (Chrétien, 1915)

Synonyms
- Gelechia flavonigrella Chretien, 1915

Species of moth

Mirificarma flavonigrella is a moth of the family Gelechiidae. It is found in Algeria.

The wingspan is about 6 mm for males. Adults are on wing in May.
