= Mirificarma ocellinella =

Scientific classification
- Domain: Eukaryota
- Kingdom: Animalia
- Phylum: Arthropoda
- Class: Insecta
- Order: Lepidoptera
- Family: Gelechiidae
- Genus: Mirificarma
- Species: M. ocellinella

Binomial name
- Mirificarma ocellinella (Chrétien, 1915)

Synonyms
- Gelechia ocellinella Chretien, 1915; Gelechia aurantiella Chretien, 1915; Gelechia retamaeofoliella Dumont, 1931

Species of moth

Mirificarma ocellinella is a moth of the family Gelechiidae. It is found in Morocco, Algeria, Tunisia, Libya and Jordan.

The wingspan is 9–11 mm for males and 8.5-10.5 mm for females. Adults are on wing in January, from March to May and from September to November.

The larvae feed on Retama raetam.
