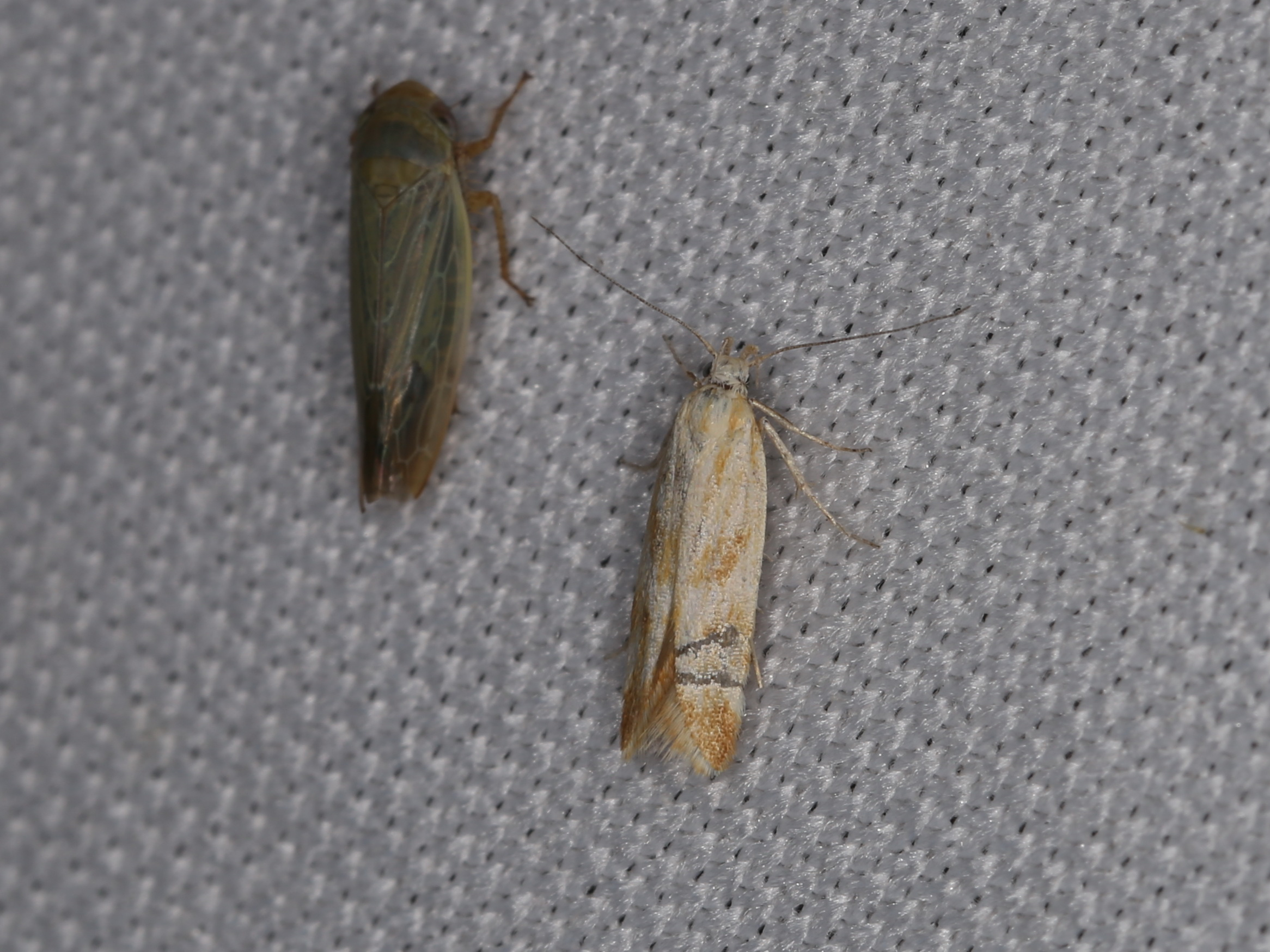

Scientific classification
- Kingdom: Animalia
- Phylum: Arthropoda
- Clade: Pancrustacea
- Class: Insecta
- Order: Lepidoptera
- Family: Gelechiidae
- Genus: Mirificarma
- Species: M. eburnella

Binomial name
- Mirificarma eburnella (Denis & Schiffermüller, 1775)

Synonyms
- Tinea eburnella Denis & Schiffermuller, 1775; Tinea formosella Hubner, 1796; Mirificarma formosella; Carcina flammella Hubner, [1825]; Gelechia rufeoformosella Bruand d'Uzelle, 1859

= Mirificarma eburnella =

Species of moth

Mirificarma eburnella is a moth of the family Gelechiidae. It is found in western, central and southern Europe and extends to North Africa, the Middle East and Russia. It is also found in California, United States, where it is presumed to have been introduced.

The wingspan is 5-7.5 mm for males and 5.5-7.5 mm for females. The head is cream. Adults have been collected from March to July in Europe and in May and June in North America.

The larvae feed on Medicago sativa, Medicago lupulina, Medicago polymorpha, Trifolium repens, Trifolium hirtum, Vicia americana and Hippocrepis comosa. Larvae have been found in April and May.
