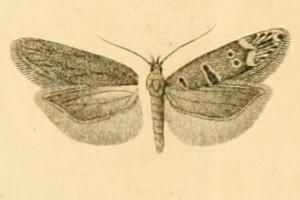

Scientific classification
- Domain: Eukaryota
- Kingdom: Animalia
- Phylum: Arthropoda
- Class: Insecta
- Order: Lepidoptera
- Family: Gelechiidae
- Genus: Mirificarma
- Species: M. rhodoptera

Binomial name
- Mirificarma rhodoptera (Mann, 1866)

Synonyms
- Gelechia rhodoptera Mann, 1866

= Mirificarma rhodoptera =

Moth of the family Gelechiidae from Romania, Greece, Turkey, Israel and Lebanon

Mirificarma rhodoptera is a moth of the family Gelechiidae. It is found in Romania, Greece, Turkey, Israel and Lebanon.

The wingspan measures 5-7.5 mm for males and 5.5–7 mm for females. Adults of the large form (typical form) are found in June and July, those of the small form in May and June.
