= Mirificarma minimella =

Scientific classification
- Kingdom: Animalia
- Phylum: Arthropoda
- Clade: Pancrustacea
- Class: Insecta
- Order: Lepidoptera
- Family: Gelechiidae
- Genus: Mirificarma
- Species: M. minimella

Binomial name
- Mirificarma minimella Huemer & Karsholt, 2001

Species of moth

Mirificarma minimella is a moth of the family Gelechiidae. It was described by Peter Huemer and Ole Karsholt in 2001. It is found in Greece.
