= Mirificarma fasciata =

Scientific classification
- Domain: Eukaryota
- Kingdom: Animalia
- Phylum: Arthropoda
- Class: Insecta
- Order: Lepidoptera
- Family: Gelechiidae
- Genus: Mirificarma
- Species: M. fasciata

Binomial name
- Mirificarma fasciata Pitkin, 1984

Species of moth

Mirificarma fasciata is a moth of the family Gelechiidae. It is found in Spain.
