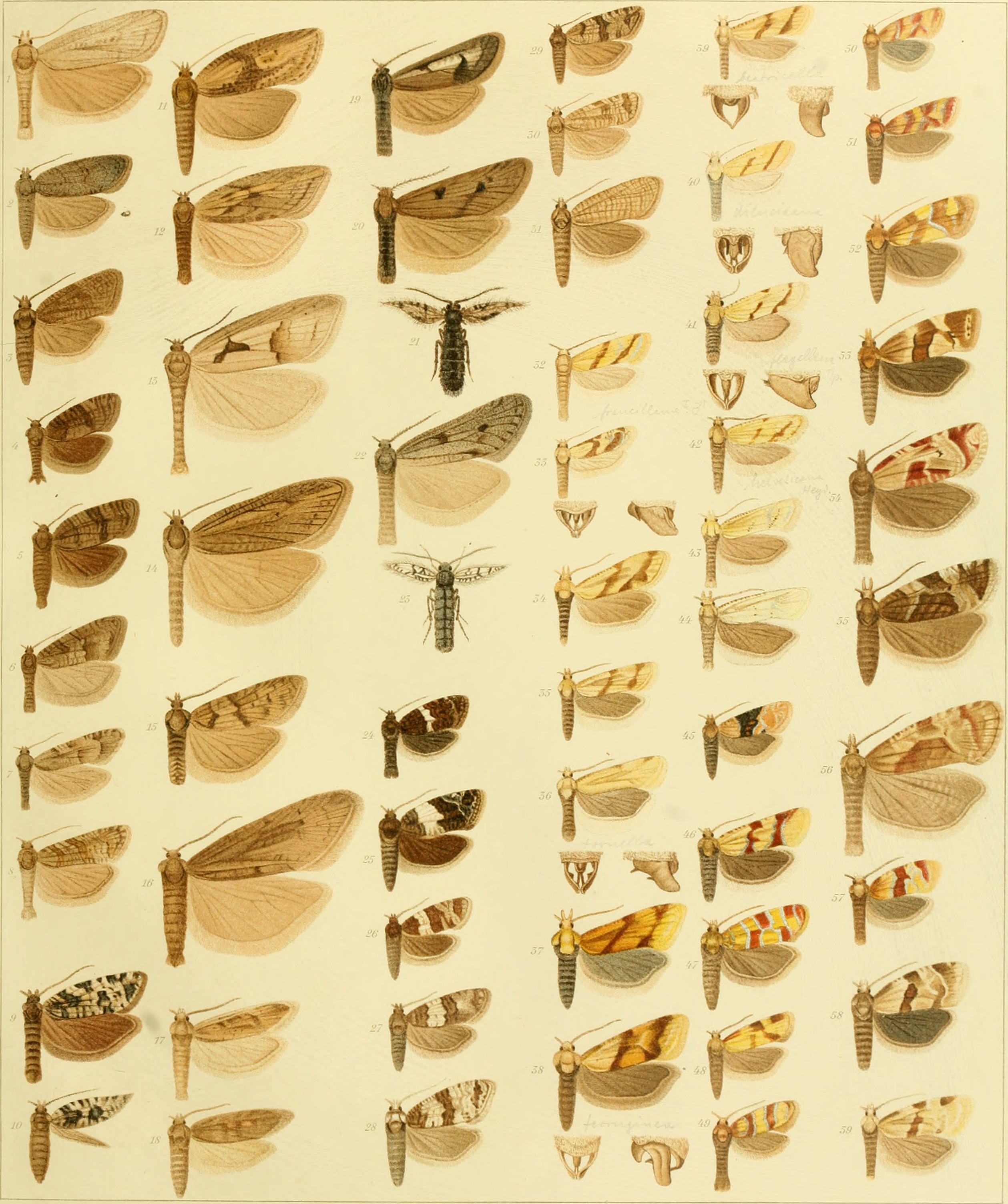
- Aethes bilbaensis in Die palaearktischen tortriciden figure 33

Scientific classification
- Domain: Eukaryota
- Kingdom: Animalia
- Phylum: Arthropoda
- Class: Insecta
- Order: Lepidoptera
- Family: Tortricidae
- Genus: Aethes
- Species: A. bilbaensis

Binomial name
- Aethes bilbaensis (Rössler, 1877)

Synonyms
- Conchylis francillana var. bilbaensis Rossler, 1877; Phalonia loxoperoides Walsingham, 1903; Lozopera mediterranea Rebel, 1906; Phalonia reclusa Meyrick, 1923

= Aethes bilbaensis =

Species of moth

Aethes bilbaensis is a species of moth of the family Tortricidae. It is found in Morocco, Algeria, the Iberian Peninsula, southern France, Italy, Croatia, Albania, Greece, Austria, the Czech Republic, Slovakia, Hungary, Romania, Bulgaria, Russia, Asia Minor, the Palestinian territories, Lebanon, Iran, Afghanistan, Pakistan, Kazakhstan, Kyrgyzstan and Turkmenistan. It is found in xerothermic (hot and dry) habitats.

The wingspan is 10–15 millimetres (0.39–0.59 in). Adults are on wing from May to June and again from July to September in two generations per year.

The larvae feed on Crithmum maritimum and Carum verticillatum. The species overwinters in the larval stage.
