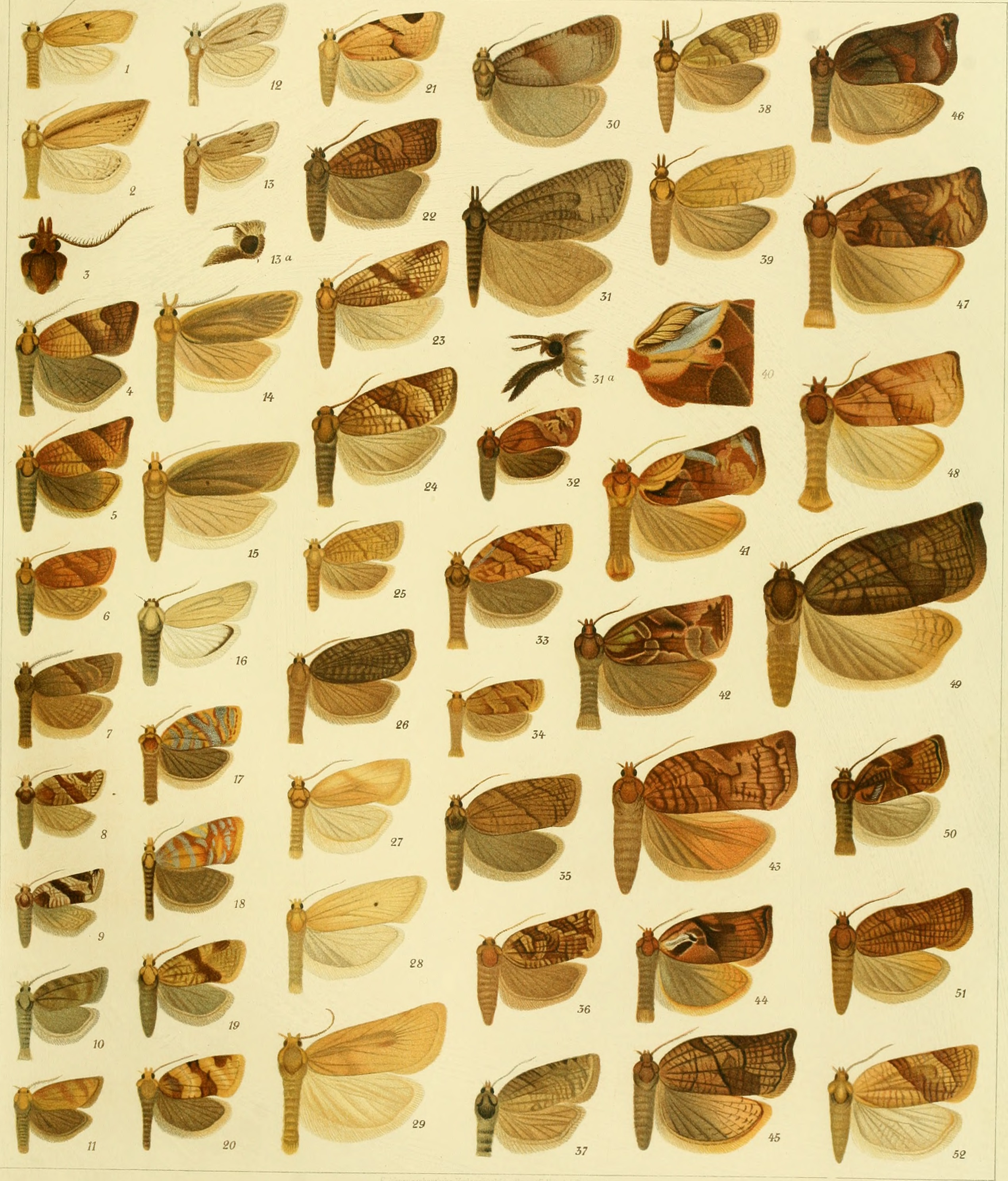
- Philedonides rhombicana in Kennel Die palaearktischen tortriciden figure 6 female

Scientific classification
- Domain: Eukaryota
- Kingdom: Animalia
- Phylum: Arthropoda
- Class: Insecta
- Order: Lepidoptera
- Family: Tortricidae
- Genus: Philedonides
- Species: P. rhombicana

Binomial name
- Philedonides rhombicana (Herrich-Schäffer, 1851)

Synonyms
- Tortrix (Lozotaenia) rhombicana Herrich-Schäffer, 1851; Philedonides alexinschii St noiu & Nemes, 1974; rhombicana Herrich-Schaffer, 1847

= Philedonides rhombicana =

Species of moth

Philedonides rhombicana is a species of moth of the family Tortricidae. It is found in Germany, Austria, Italy, the Czech Republic, Slovakia, Hungary, Romania and Ukraine.

The wingspan is 13–16 mm. Adults are on wing from June to August.

The larvae feed on Mentha, Trifolium, Rumex (including Rumex acetosella), Genista and Rosa species.
