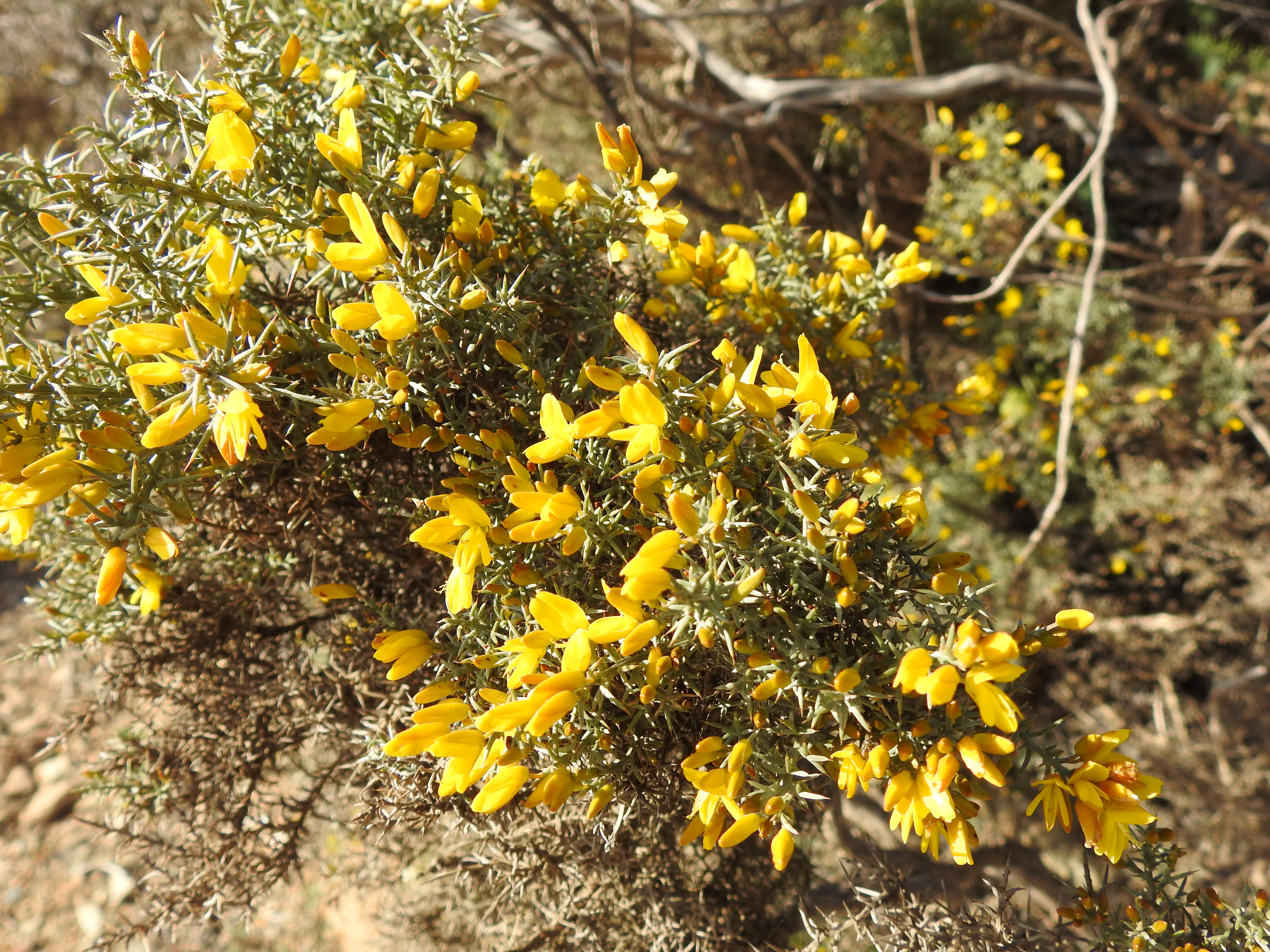
- Ulex argenteus in flower in Castro Marim, Portugal

Conservation status
- Least Concern (IUCN 3.1)

Scientific classification
- Kingdom: Plantae
- Clade: Tracheophytes
- Clade: Angiosperms
- Clade: Eudicots
- Clade: Rosids
- Order: Fabales
- Family: Fabaceae
- Subfamily: Faboideae
- Genus: Ulex
- Species: U. argenteus

Binomial name
- Ulex argenteus Webb

= Ulex argenteus =

Species of plant

Ulex argenteus is a species of gorse native to southern Portugal (Algarve and Alentejo) in the Iberian Peninsula.

== Description ==
Ulex argenteus is a low-growing shrub with an open branching structure. Branches, stems, and spines are densely covered in short erect hairs, which give the species a silvery colour. Spines are thin and straight or sometimes slightly arched. The calyx is typically 7.5 to 8.5 mm long.

== Taxonomy and systematics ==
Ulex argenteus is a diploid species. Ulex canescens (diploid), and Ulex erinaceus and Ulex subsericeus (both polyploid) have been included in Ulex argenteus in the past, as subspecies or synonyms. However, phylogenetic evidence suggests they are not closely related to U. argenteus.

== Distribution and habitat ==
The species is distributed in southern Portugal, growing in both metamorphic and calcareous hills.

== Conservation ==
The species has a narrow distribution range but remains common in suitable habitat. As a result, it has been assessed as Least Concern.
