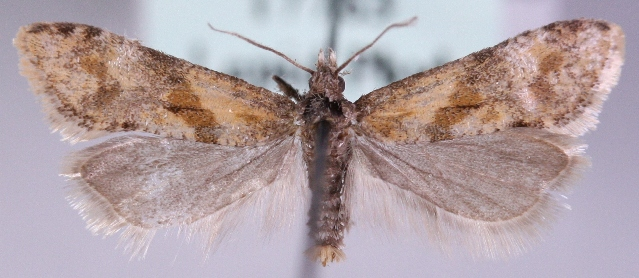

Scientific classification
- Domain: Eukaryota
- Kingdom: Animalia
- Phylum: Arthropoda
- Class: Insecta
- Order: Lepidoptera
- Family: Tortricidae
- Genus: Cochylidia
- Species: C. moguntiana

Binomial name
- Cochylidia moguntiana (Rössler, 1864)

Synonyms
- Tortrix moguntiana Rössler, 1864; Conchylis griseolana Petersen, 1924; Phalonia trafvenfelti Benander, 1949; Cochylidia grieolana Byun, Park & Lee, 1996

= Cochylidia moguntiana =

Species of moth

Cochylidia moguntiana is a species of moth of the family Tortricidae. It is found in Spain, Sweden, Denmark, Germany, Poland, Austria, Italy, the Czech Republic, Slovakia, Croatia, Hungary, Romania, Estonia, Latvia, Lithuania, Russia, Afghanistan, Kyrgyzstan, northern Pakistan, Iran, China (Anhui, Beijing, Fujian, Gansu, Guizhou, Hebei, Heilongjiang, Henan, Hunan, Inner Mongolia, Liaoning, Ningxia, Shaanxi, Shandong, Shanxi, Sichuan, Tianjin) and Korea.

The wingspan is 9–15 mm. Adults have been recorded on wing in July and August in Europe.

The larvae feed on Artemisia campestris. Larvae can be found in May and June.
