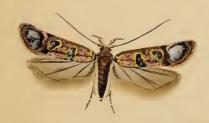

Scientific classification
- Kingdom: Animalia
- Phylum: Arthropoda
- Clade: Pancrustacea
- Class: Insecta
- Order: Lepidoptera
- Family: Gelechiidae
- Genus: Mirificarma
- Species: M. maculatella

Binomial name
- Mirificarma maculatella (Hübner, 1796)

Synonyms
- Tinea maculatella Hubner, 1796

= Mirificarma maculatella =

Species of moth

Mirificarma maculatella is a moth of the family Gelechiidae. It is found in most of Europe, except Ireland, Great Britain, Portugal, the Benelux, Denmark, Fennoscandia, the Baltic region and Greece. It has also been recorded from Turkey and Syria.

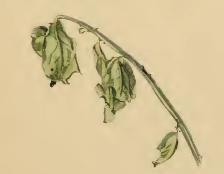
A leaf of Coronilla varia eaten by larva

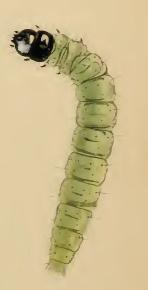
Larva

The wingspan is 7–9.5 mm for males and 7.5–9 mm for females. The head is mottled mid-brown. The forewings are mottled brown and light pink-grey with an ochreous tinge near the base. Adults are on wing from June to August.

The larvae feed on Securigera varia. They feed from within spun leaves. Larvae can be found in May and June. Pupation takes place in a slight cocoon on the ground.
