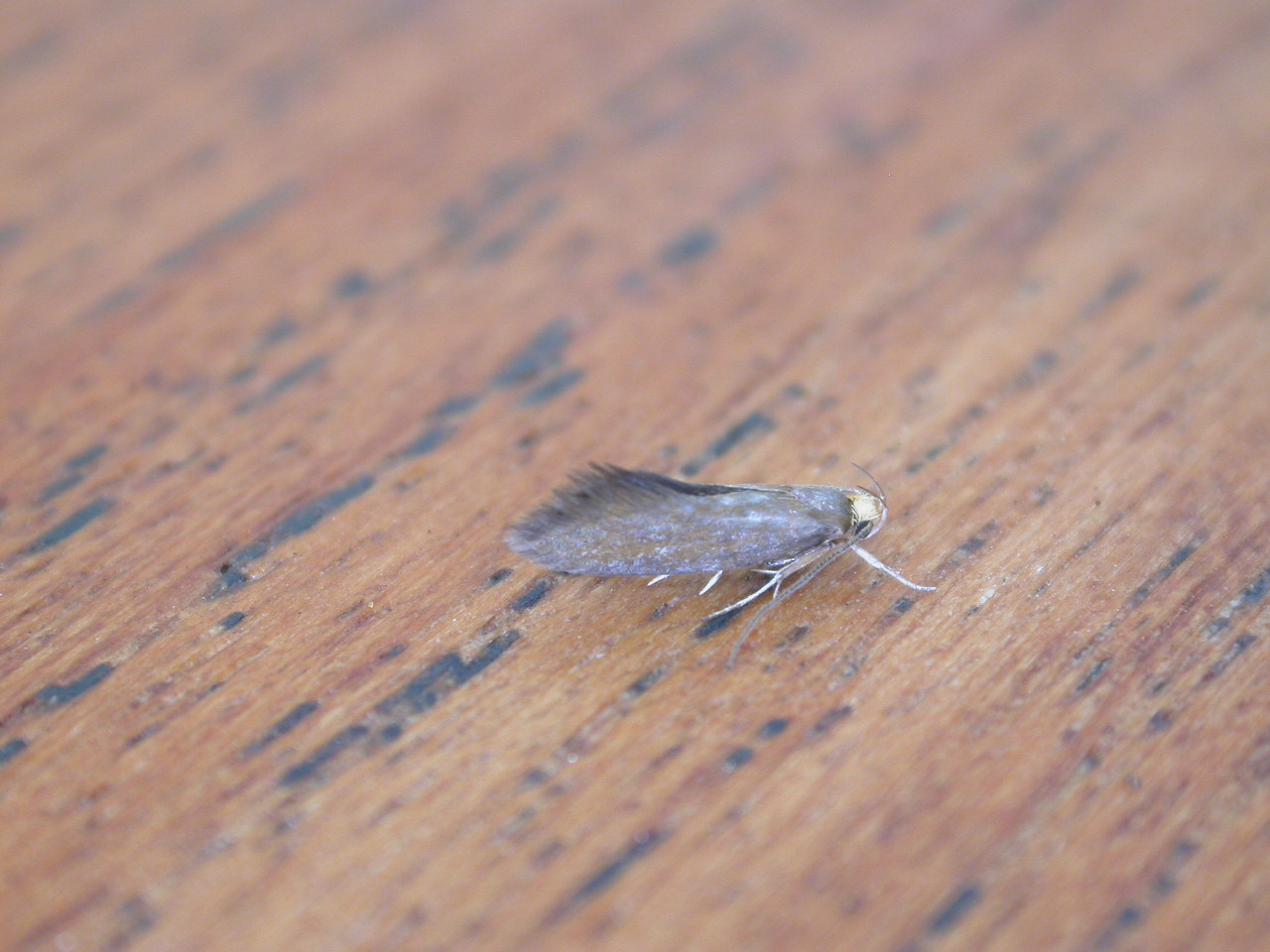

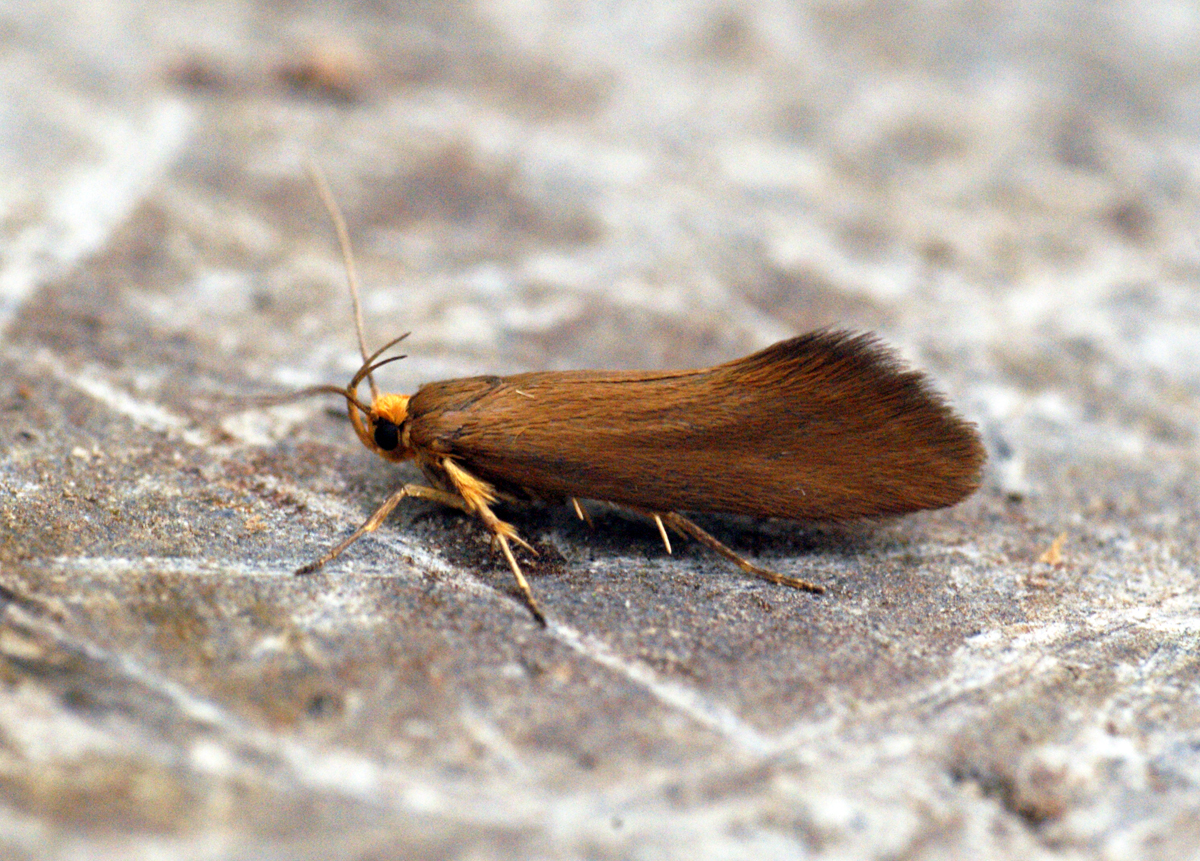

Scientific classification
- Kingdom: Animalia
- Phylum: Arthropoda
- Clade: Pancrustacea
- Class: Insecta
- Order: Lepidoptera
- Family: Oecophoridae
- Genus: Crassa
- Species: C. unitella

Binomial name
- Crassa unitella (Hübner, 1796)

Synonyms
- Tinea unitella Hubner, 1796; Batia unitella

= Crassa unitella =

Species of moth

Crassa unitella is a moth of the family Oecophoridae. It is known from most of Europe.

The wingspan is 18–20 mm. Adults are on wing from early June to the end of August.
