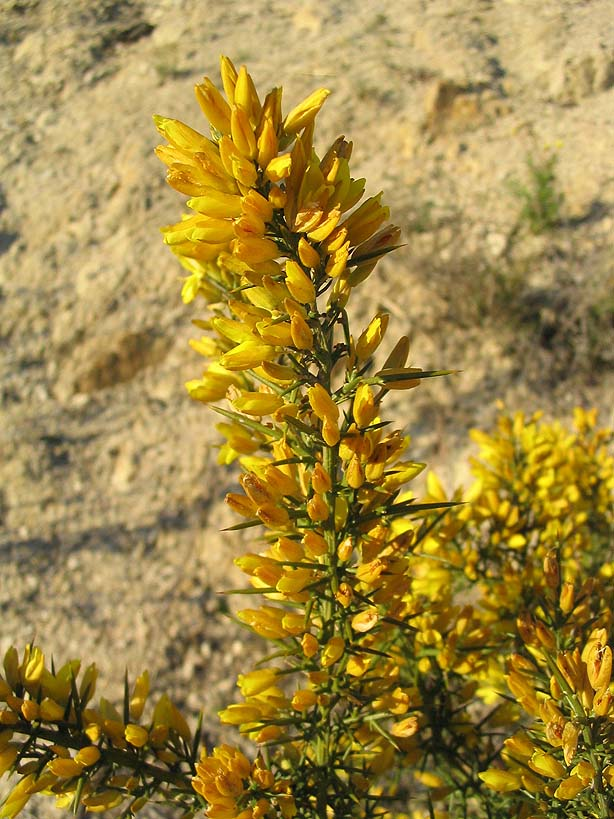

Scientific classification
- Kingdom: Plantae
- Clade: Tracheophytes
- Clade: Angiosperms
- Clade: Eudicots
- Clade: Rosids
- Order: Fabales
- Family: Fabaceae
- Subfamily: Faboideae
- Genus: Ulex
- Species: U. parviflorus

Binomial name
- Ulex parviflorus Pourr.

= Ulex parviflorus =

Species of flowering plant

Ulex parviflorus is a species of gorse native to France, the Iberian Peninsula, and parts of the Maghreb.

Ulex parviflorus was described by Pierre André Pourret in 1788.
