= Adolph Rössler =

German entomologist

Adolf Rössler (1814, Usingen – 1885, Wiesbaden), was a German entomologist who specialised in Lepidoptera.Amongst others he described Cochylidia moguntiana (Rössler, 1864), Aethes bilbaensis (Rössler, 1877) and Eupithecia millefoliata Rössler, 1866

Adolf Rössler, also Adolph, was a jurist and artist. His collection of Palearctic Lepidoptera is held by Museum Wiesbaden.
