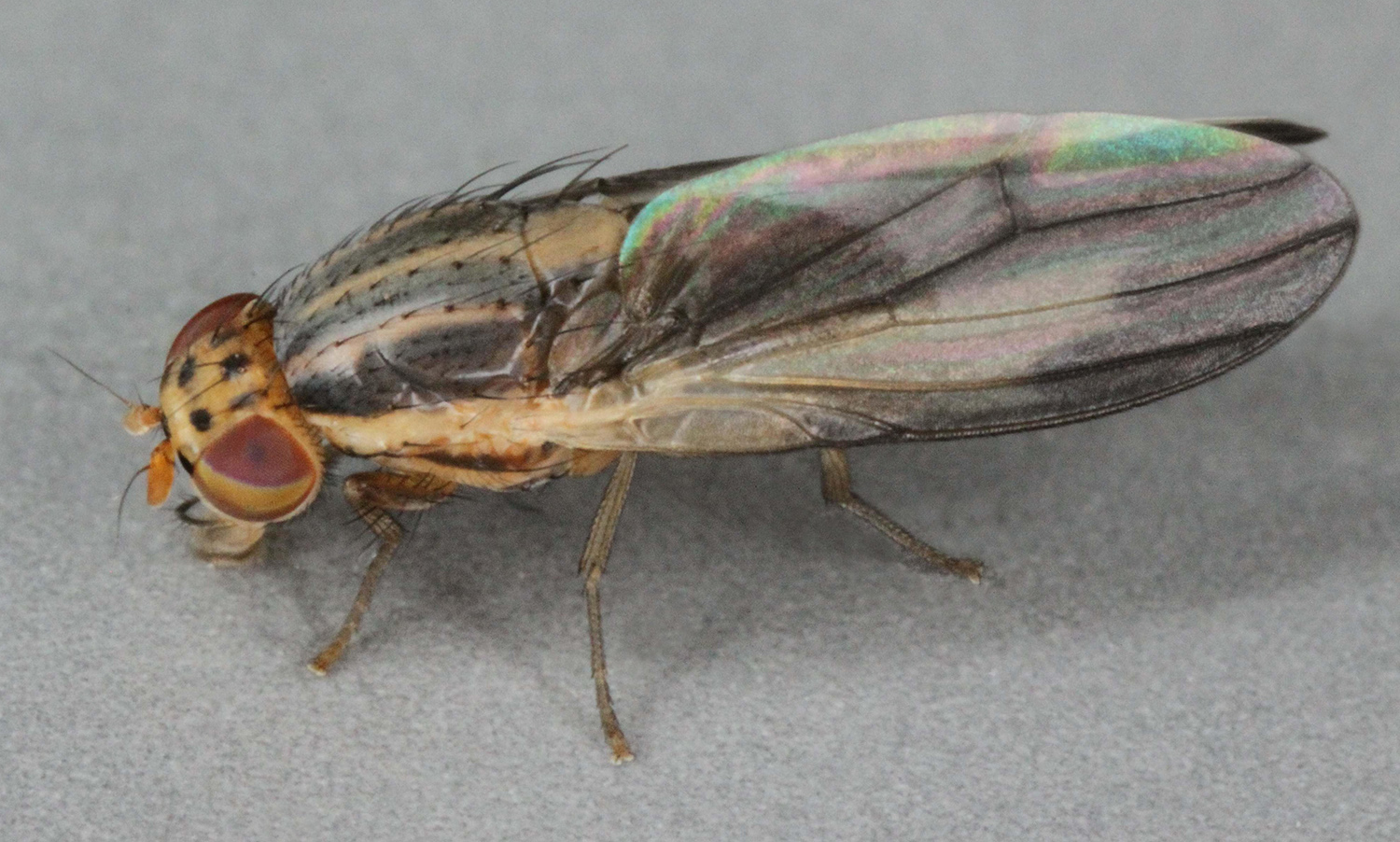
- Peplomyza litura North Wales

Scientific classification
- Kingdom: Animalia
- Phylum: Arthropoda
- Class: Insecta
- Order: Diptera
- Family: Lauxaniidae
- Genus: Peplomyza
- Species: P. litura

Binomial name
- Peplomyza litura (Meigen, 1826)

Synonyms
- Sapromyza litura Meigen, 1826; Sapromyza wiedemanni Loew, 1845

= Peplomyza litura =

Species of fly

Peplomyza litura is a species of fly in the family Lauxaniidae. It is found in the Palearctic.

Video

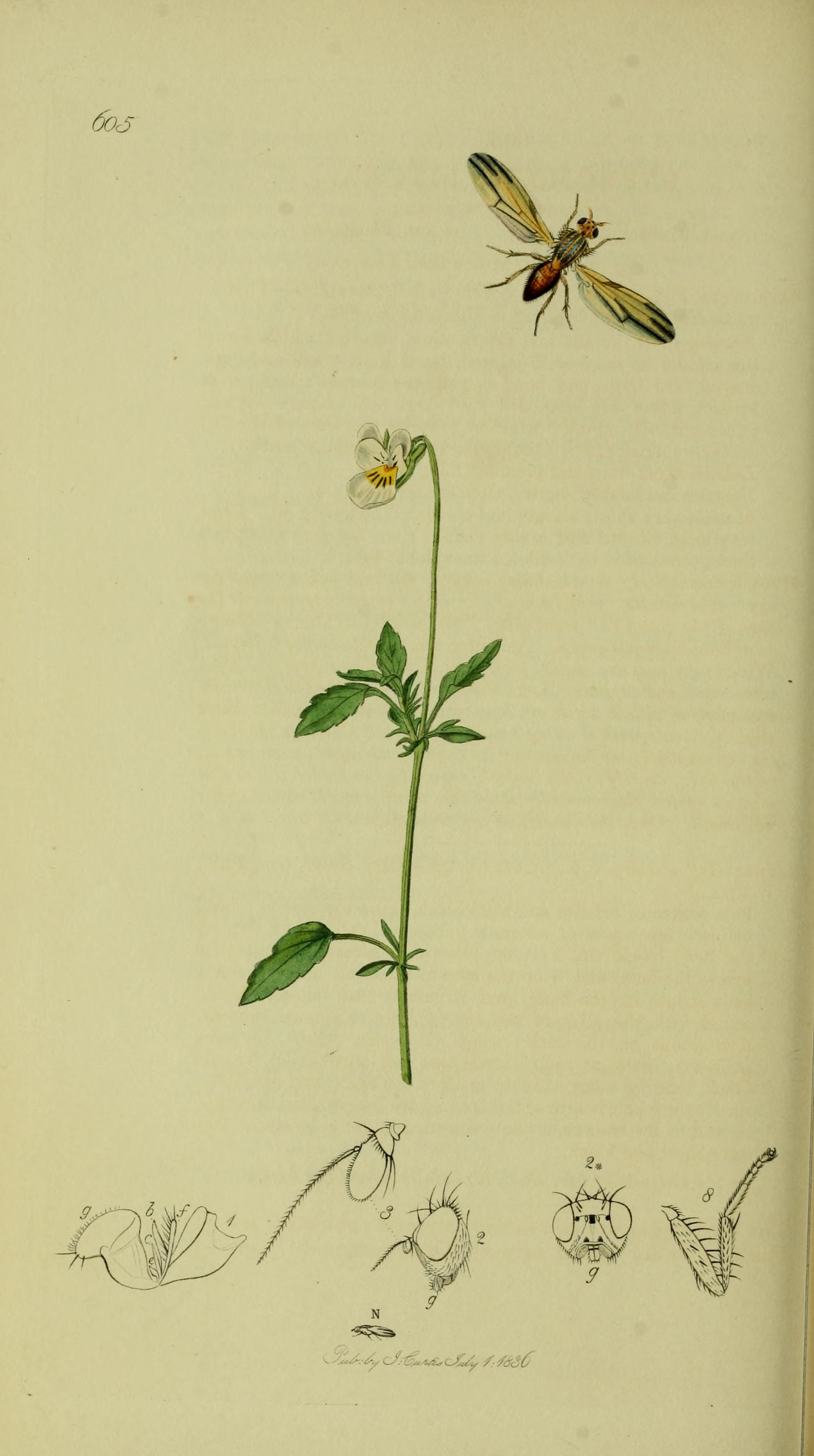
in British Entomology
