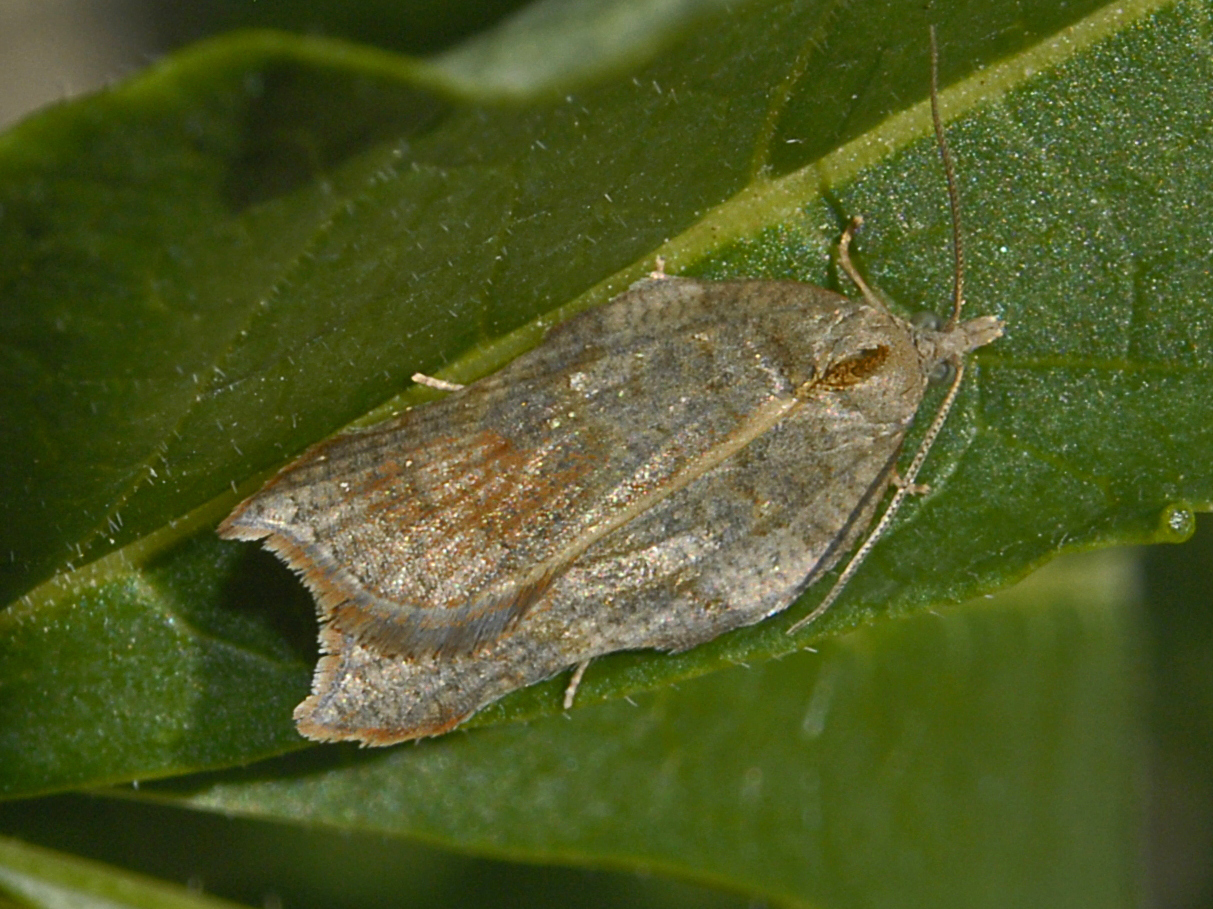

Scientific classification
- Kingdom: Animalia
- Phylum: Arthropoda
- Class: Insecta
- Order: Lepidoptera
- Family: Tortricidae
- Genus: Acleris
- Species: A. emargana

Binomial name
- Acleris emargana (Fabricius, 1775)

Synonyms
- Pyralis emargana Fabricius, 1775; Pyralis caudana Fabricius, 1775; Phalaena emarganac var. excavana Donovan, 1794; Pyralis scabrana Fabricius, 1781; Teras caudana var. ochracea Stephens, 1834; Acalla emargana f. fasciana Müller-Rutz, 1927; Rhacodia emargana f. griseana Sheldon, 1930; Rhacodia emargana f. fuscana Sheldon, 1930; Acalla caudana f. brunneostriana Weber, 1945; Tortrix candana Werneburg, 1864; Acalla emargana Kennel, 1908; Acleris emargana Obraztsov, 1956

= Acleris emargana =

Species of moth

Acleris emargana, the notched-winged tortricid, is a moth of the family Tortricidae. The species was first described by Johan Christian Fabricius in 1775.

== Subspecies ==
- Acleris emargana emargana (Europe to Japan)
- Acleris emargana tibetica (Tibet)

Acleris emargana blackmorei, described as occurring in North America, was formerly considered a subspecies of A. emargana. Per Karsholt et al. (2005), it is now considered synonymous with Acleris effractana.

== Description ==
Acleris emargana has a wingspan of 18–22 mm. Appearance can vary between individuals within the species. In general, the forewings are greyish brown or yellow ochreous, lightly translucent, usually more or less notched and hooked on the costa, with a reticulated (net-like) pattern. Hindwings are greyish and translucent. Julius von Kennel provides a full description. Very similar to and much confused with Acleris effractana.

The moths are on wing from July to November and fly at dusk.

The larvae can reach a length of about 15 mm. They are pale green, with a pale brown head. Caterpillars feed on the leaves and shoots of various trees, including Alnus glutinosa, Corylus, Salix, Populus and Betula.

== Distribution ==
The nominotypical subspecies Acleris emargana emargana is found from Europe to Siberia, northern China, Korea and Japan. In Tibet, ssp. Acleris emargana tibetica is found.

== Gallery ==
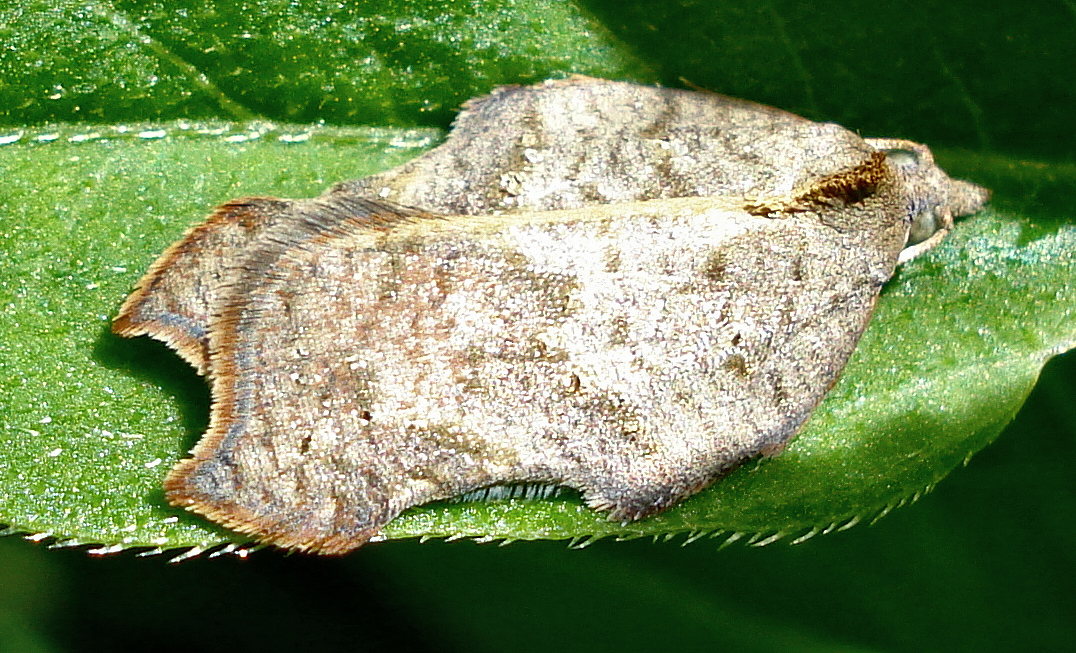
Acleris emargana emargana

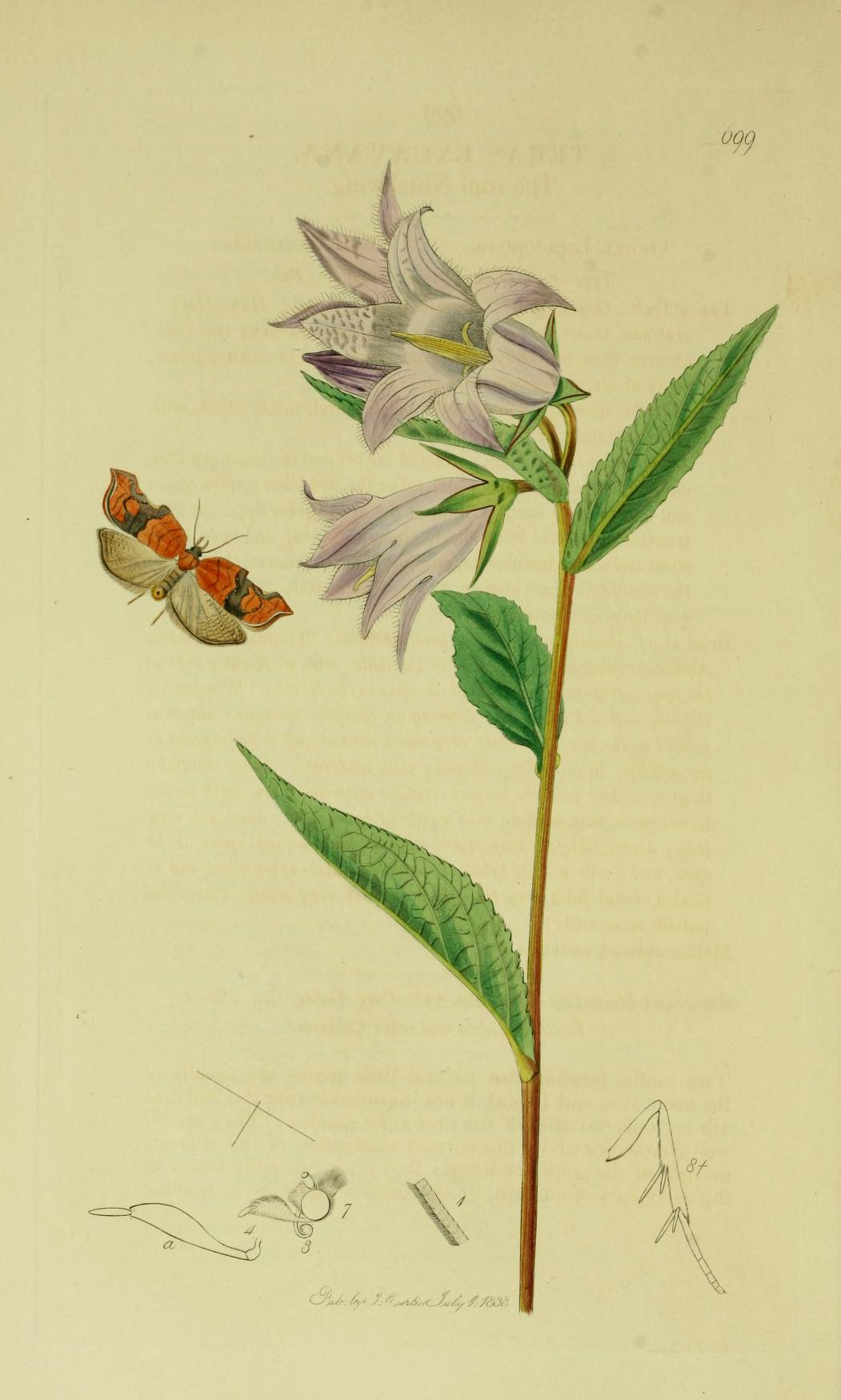
Illustration from John Curtis's British Entomology Volume 6
