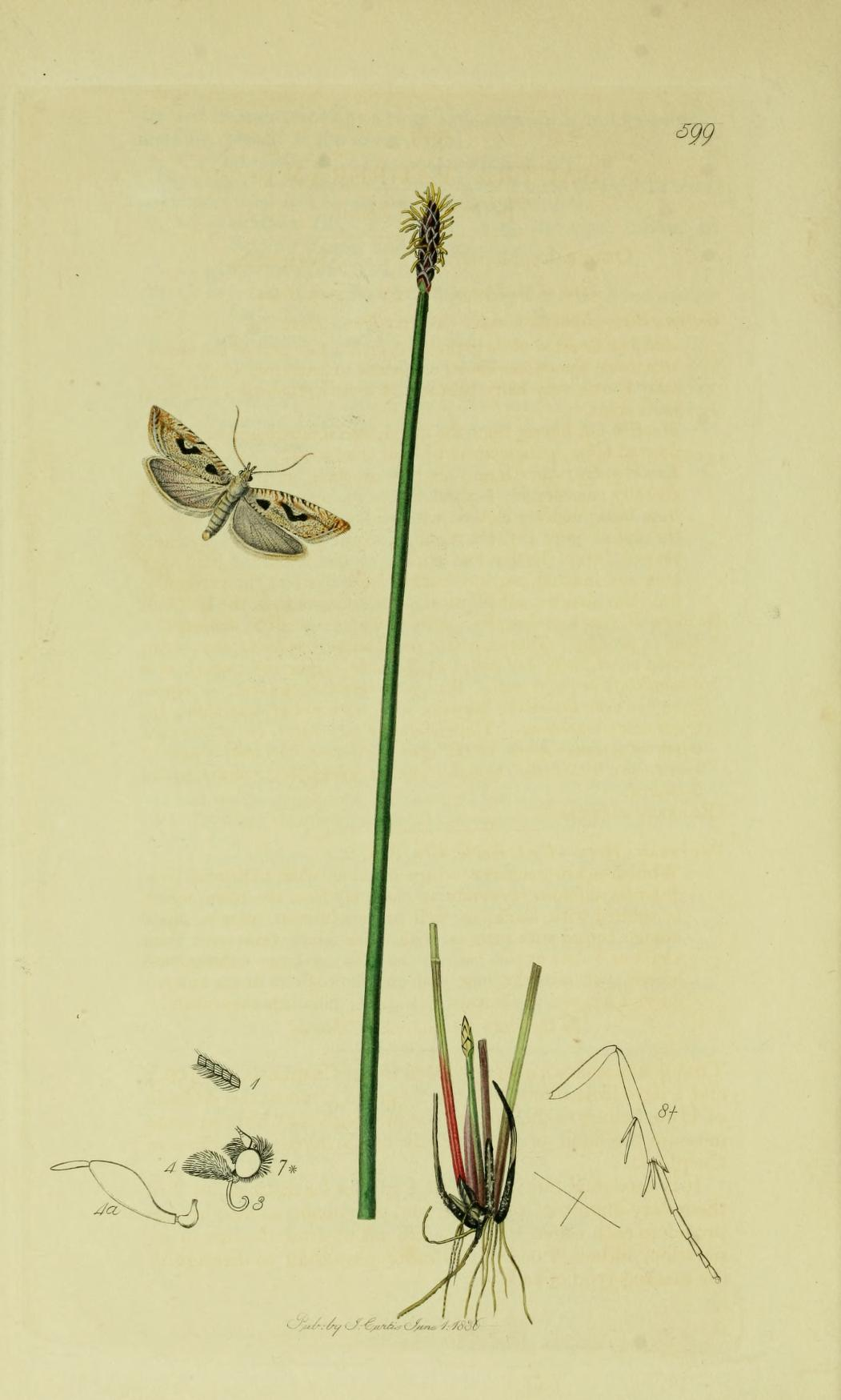
- Illustration from John Curtis's British Entomology Volume 6

Scientific classification
- Domain: Eukaryota
- Kingdom: Animalia
- Phylum: Arthropoda
- Class: Insecta
- Order: Lepidoptera
- Family: Tortricidae
- Genus: Phaneta
- Species: P. pauperana

Binomial name
- Phaneta pauperana (Duponchel, in Godart, 1842)

Synonyms
- Conchylis pauperana Duponchel, in Godart, 1842; Eucosma pauperana (Duponchel, 1843); Bactra pauperana; Epiblema pauperana

= Phaneta pauperana =

Species of moth

Phaneta pauperana is a moth of the family Tortricidae. It is found in most of central and southern Europe.

The wingspan is 12–17 mm. Adults are on wing from April to May.

The larvae feed on Rosa canina.
