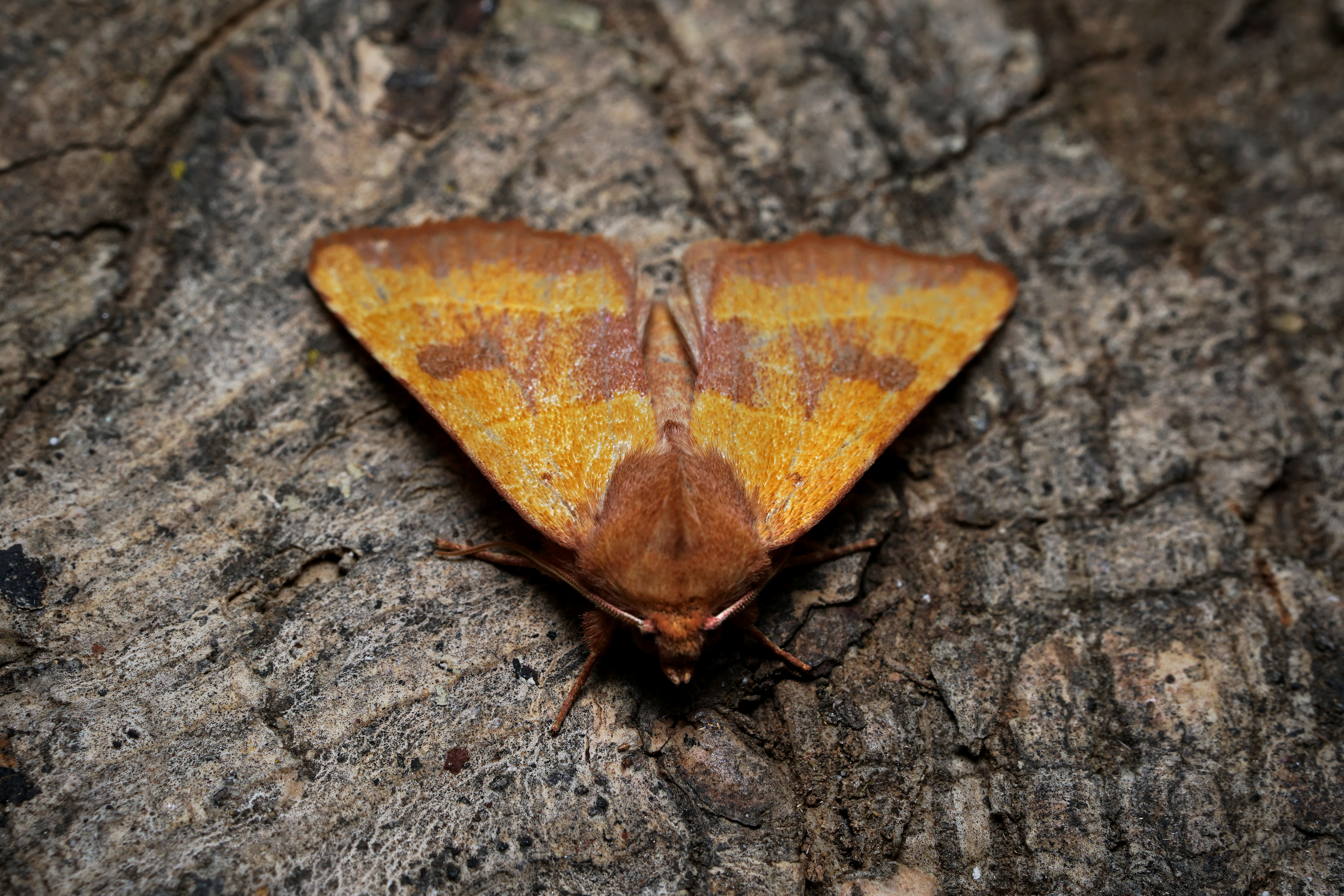

Scientific classification
- Domain: Eukaryota
- Kingdom: Animalia
- Phylum: Arthropoda
- Class: Insecta
- Order: Lepidoptera
- Superfamily: Noctuoidea
- Family: Noctuidae
- Genus: Atethmia
- Species: A. centrago

Binomial name
- Atethmia centrago (Haworth, 1809)

= Atethmia centrago =

Centre-barred sallow

Species of moth

Atethmia centrago, the centre-barred sallow, is a moth of the family Noctuidae. The species was first described by Adrian Hardy Haworth in 1809. It is found in Europe except Scandinavia and Italy; also in Asia Minor, Armenia, Syria and Palestine.

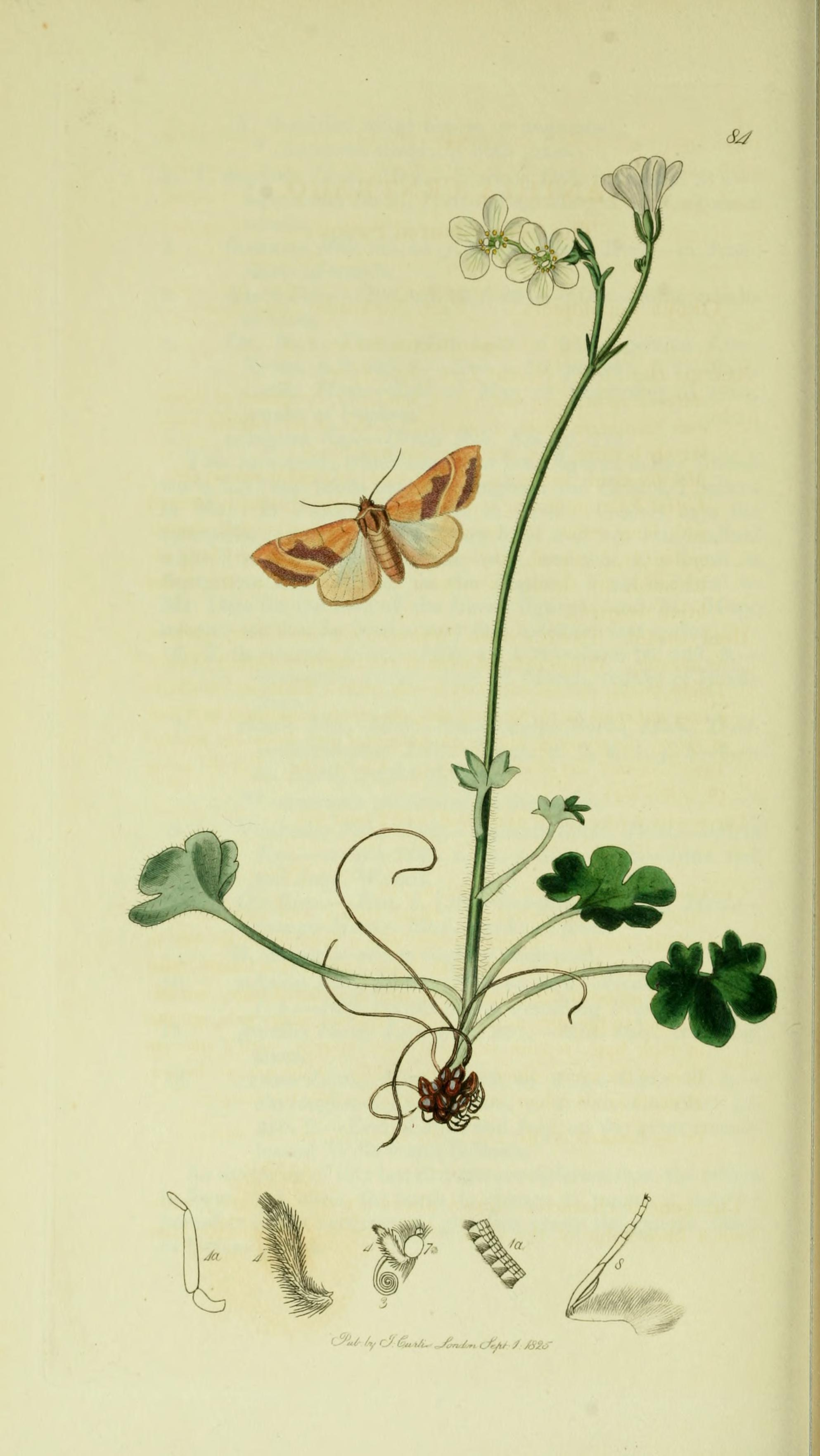
Illustration from John Curtis's British Entomology Volume 5

== Description ==
The wingspan is 32–36 mm. Forewing deep yellow, with a greyish purple central fascia, terminal area beyond submarginal line of the same colour; the central fascia is edged inwardly by a pale vertical inner line, and outwardly by an obliquely sinuous outer line; the fascia does not reach above the middle except beyond the reniform stigma which is similarly coloured; fringe greyish purple; a small dark spot shows at base of cell; hindwing dull white, becoming yellowish rufous towards termen; the whole forewing is sometimes suffused with purplish, only the two lines showing yellowish and the central fascia darker; the hindwing redder; this is ab. unicolor Stgr.; — pallida Stgr. from Asia Minor is a paler form, reddish or greyish ochreous in the forewing, with the hindwing whiter; — maculifera Stgr. from Syria and Palestine is also a paler but yellowish form, with the reniform stigma large and dark, and the outer pale line more strongly excurved above; the hindwing greyish yellow; the forewing shorter with less produced apex. The larva is brownish, inclining to greyish above and to greenish grey beneath, freckled with darker brown. Of the three whitish lines along the back, the central one is widest, but this is only really distinct on the middle part of each ring. The lines are margined with black, the edging of the central one irregular, but of the others more complete. The spiracles are whitish, and the area above them is dark grey-brown enclosing paler spaces on each segment. The head is shining grey-brown freckled with blackish.

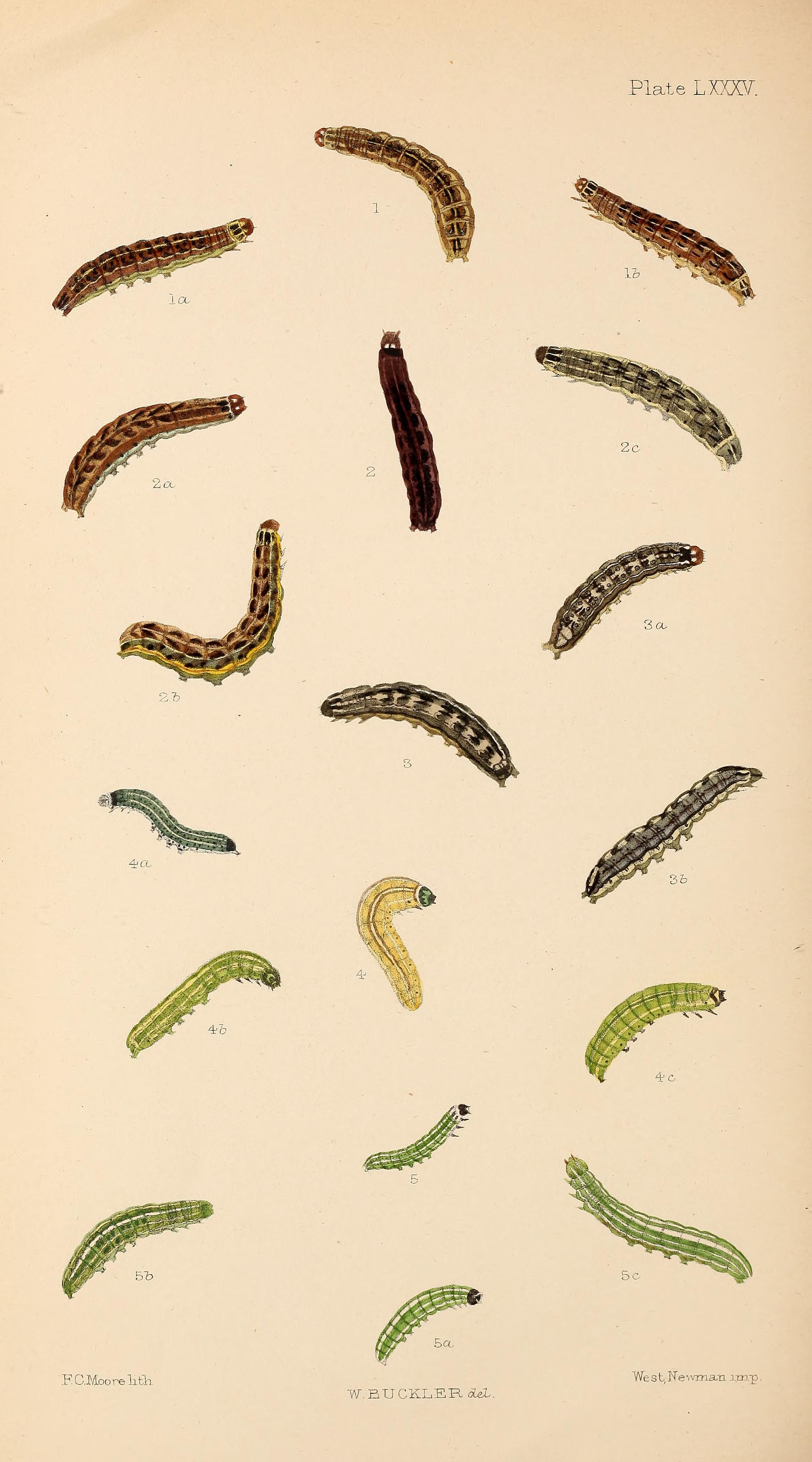
Figs 3, 3a, 3b larvae after final moult

The moth flies in one generation in from August to early October.

The caterpillars mainly feed on ash.

== Notes ==
1. The flight season refers to Belgium and the Netherlands. This may vary in other parts of the range.
