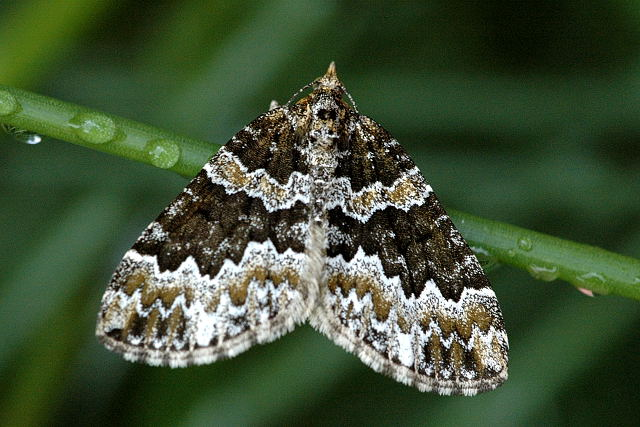

Scientific classification
- Kingdom: Animalia
- Phylum: Arthropoda
- Class: Insecta
- Order: Lepidoptera
- Family: Geometridae
- Genus: Electrophaes
- Species: E. corylata

Binomial name
- Electrophaes corylata (Thunberg, 1792)

= Electrophaes corylata =

Broken-barred carpet

Species of moth

Electrophaes corylata, the broken-barred carpet, is a moth of the family Geometridae. The species was first described by Carl Peter Thunberg in 1792.

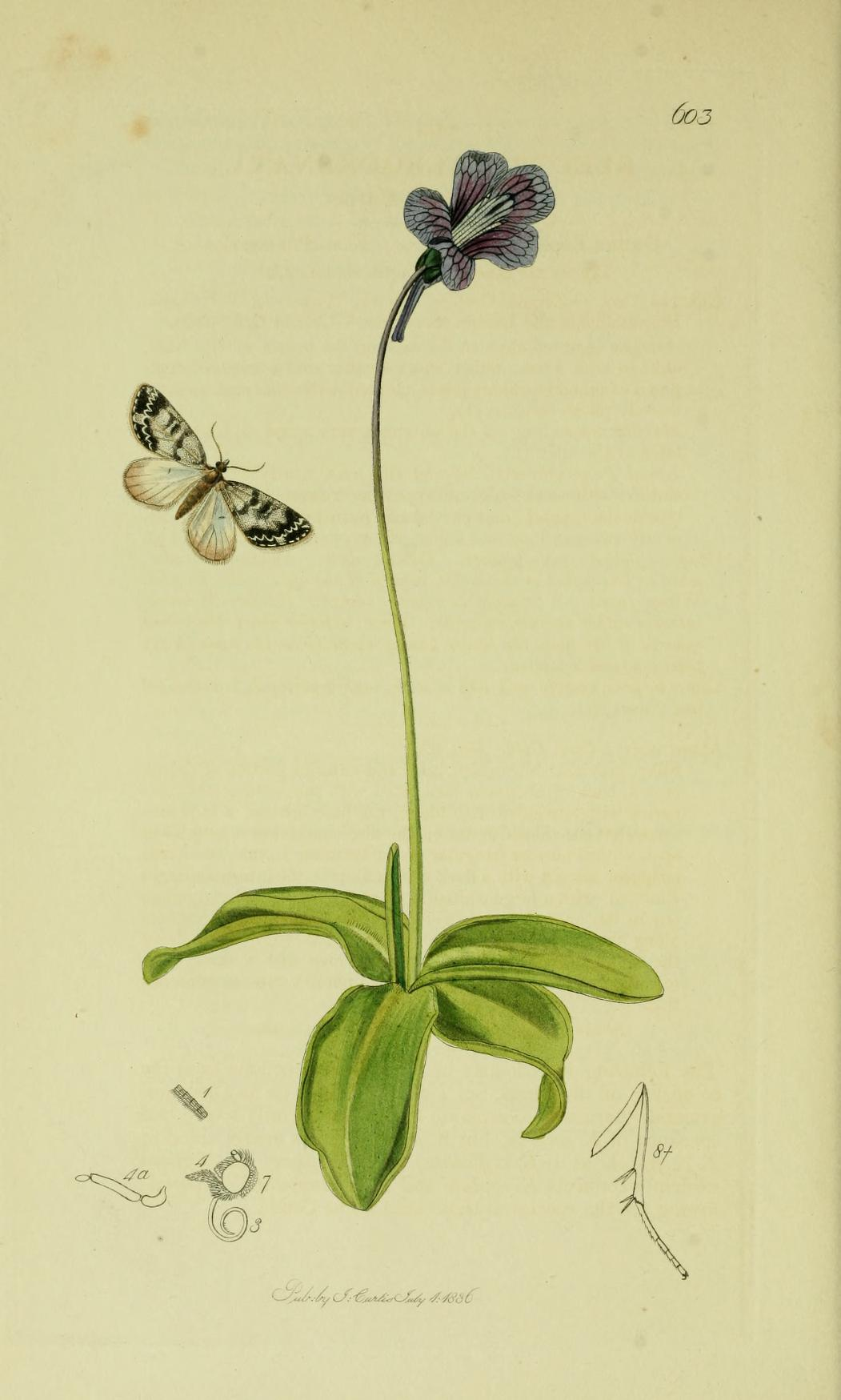
Illustration from John Curtis's British Entomology Volume 6

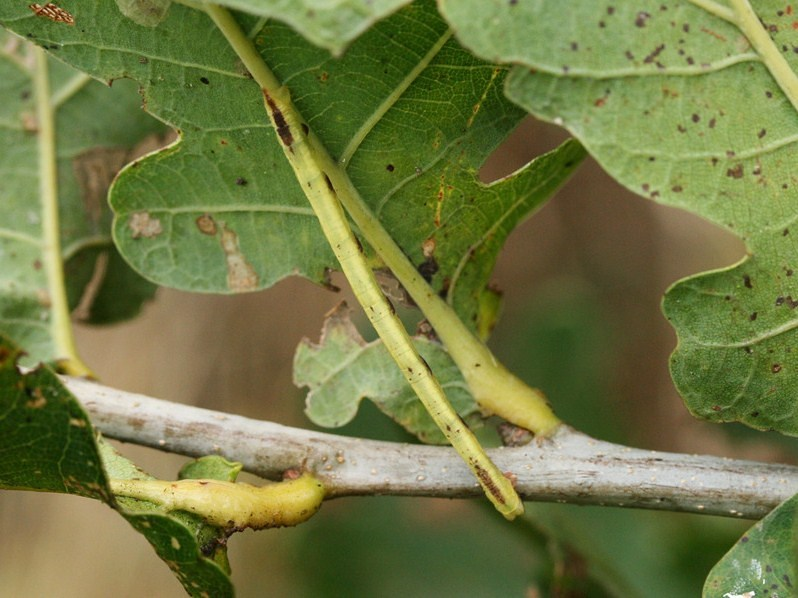
Larva

The distribution area ranges from Spain over western and central Europe and through the East Palearctic to Japan. In the north the expansion extends to Fennoscandia, in the south to Italy and the Balkans. It is absent in Portugal and Greece. Beech, birch, bog, and mixed bushy forest edges, orchards and semi-dry grasslands are preferred.

The wingspan is 22–30 mm. The ground colour of the front wings is variously dark brown, white and reddish brown. Olive colours prevail in some specimens. The median band is narrowed and can be sometimes interrupted. The outer cross line limited the midfield is much serrated. The margin field is obscured and is crossed by a strongly toothed white wavy line. There is a bright spot at the apex. The hind wings shimmer grey and have a dark cross line and a central spot.

The moths fly in one generation from May to June.

The larvae feed on a wide range of trees and bushes.

== Notes ==
1. The flight season refers to the British Isles. This may vary in other parts of the range.
