= Electrophaes aggrediens =

Scientific classification
- Kingdom: Animalia
- Phylum: Arthropoda
- Clade: Pancrustacea
- Class: Insecta
- Order: Lepidoptera
- Family: Geometridae
- Genus: Electrophaes
- Species: E. aggrediens

Binomial name
- Electrophaes aggrediens L. B. Prout, 1940

Species of moth

Electrophaes aggrediens is a moth of the family Geometridae first described by Louis Beethoven Prout in 1940. It can be found in China.
