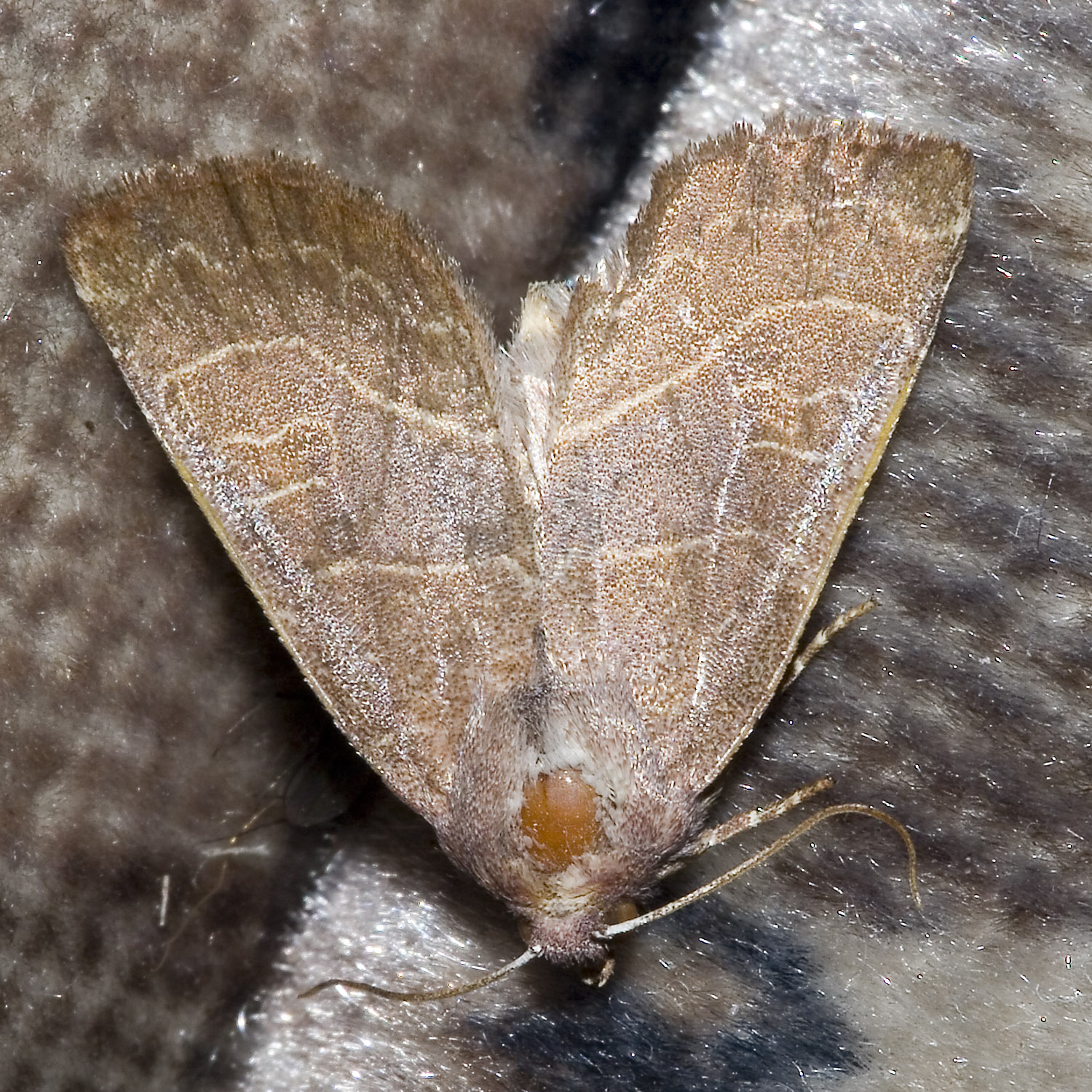

Scientific classification
- Domain: Eukaryota
- Kingdom: Animalia
- Phylum: Arthropoda
- Class: Insecta
- Order: Lepidoptera
- Superfamily: Noctuoidea
- Family: Noctuidae
- Genus: Atethmia
- Species: A. ambusta

Binomial name
- Atethmia ambusta Denis & Schiffermüller, 1775

Synonyms
- Noctua ambusta

= Atethmia ambusta =

Species of moth

Atethmia ambusta is a moth of the family Noctuidae. It is found in Central Europe (missing in northern Germany) and parts of Southern Europe to Western Asia (Turkey to Syria).

The wingspan is 25–27 mm. Adults are on wing from September to November.

Recorded food plants of the larvae include the leaves of Malus and Pyrus species.

== Subspecies ==
There are four recognised subspecies:

- Atethmia ambusta ambusta (Europe)
- Atethmia ambusta rubens (Turkey)
- Atethmia ambusta syriaca (Syria)
- Atethmia ambusta borjomensis (Kyrghyzstan)
