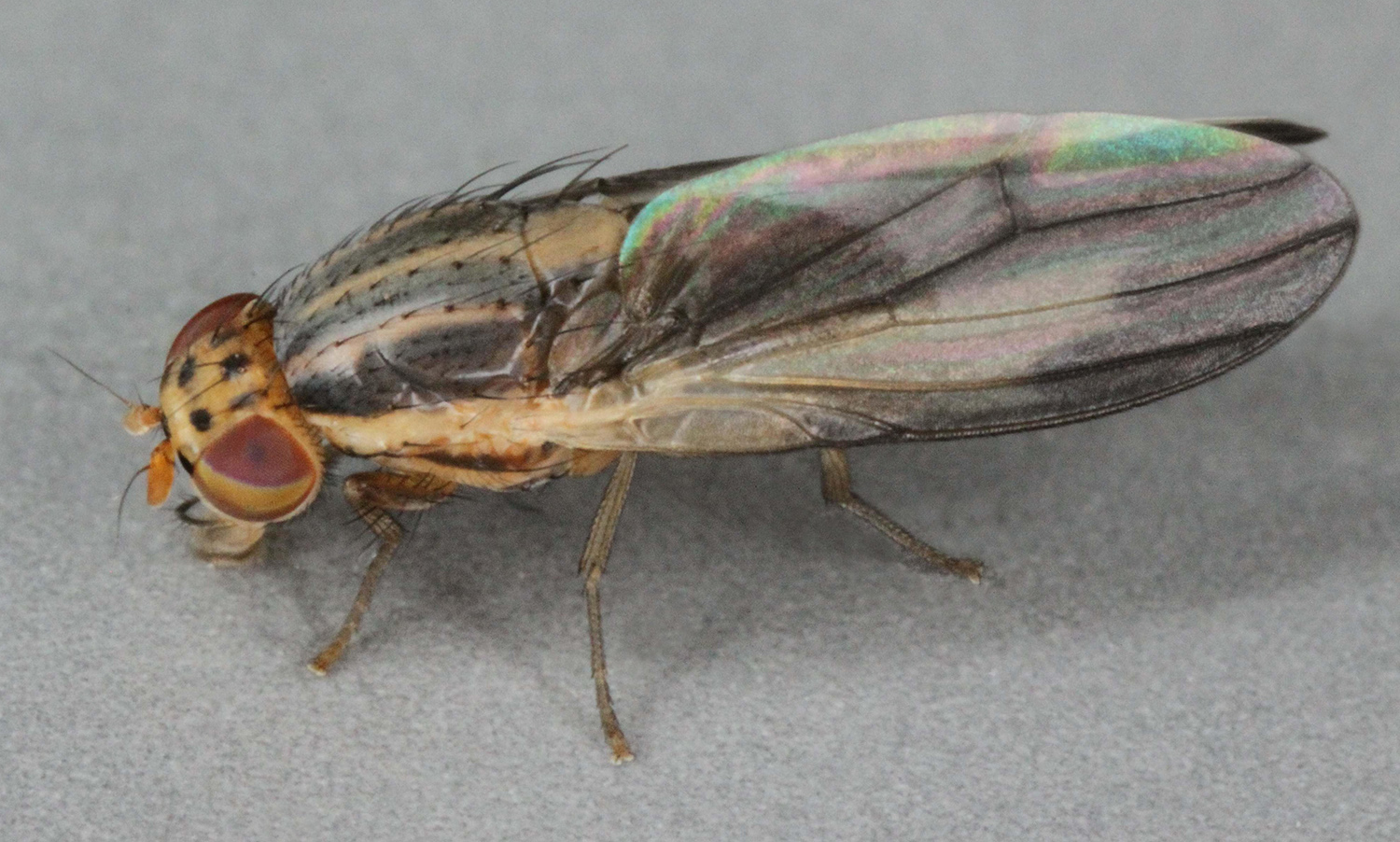
- Peplomyza litura North Wales

Scientific classification
- Kingdom: Animalia
- Phylum: Arthropoda
- Class: Insecta
- Order: Diptera
- Family: Lauxaniidae
- Subfamily: Lauxaniinae
- Genus: Peplomyza; Haliday in Curtis, 1837

Type species
- Sapromyza litura Meigen, 1826

Synonyms
- Phyllomyza Haliday, 1833

= Peplomyza =

Genus of flies

Peplomyza is a genus of flies in the family Lauxaniidae.

== Species ==
- Peplomyza baumhaueri Loew, 1845
- Peplomyza dejongi Shatalkin, 2000
- Peplomyza intermedia Remm, 1979
- Peplomyza litura Meigen, 1826
