= Atethmia algirica =

Scientific classification
- Domain: Eukaryota
- Kingdom: Animalia
- Phylum: Arthropoda
- Class: Insecta
- Order: Lepidoptera
- Superfamily: Noctuoidea
- Family: Noctuidae
- Genus: Atethmia
- Species: A. algirica

Binomial name
- Atethmia algirica (Culot, 1917)

Synonyms
- Cirrhoedia algirica Culot, 1917; Cirrhoedia schleppniki Predota, 1934; Atehtmia schleppniki (Predota, 1934); Pseudenargia schleppniki (Predota, 1934)

Species of moth

Atethmia algirica is a moth of the family Noctuidae. It is found in South-Western Europe and Algeria.
