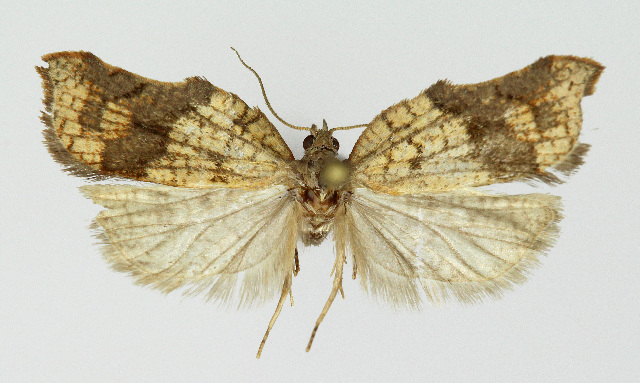

Scientific classification
- Kingdom: Animalia
- Phylum: Arthropoda
- Clade: Pancrustacea
- Class: Insecta
- Order: Lepidoptera
- Family: Tortricidae
- Genus: Acleris
- Species: A. effractana

Binomial name
- Acleris effractana (Hübner, 1799)

Synonyms
- Tortrix effractana Hübner, 1799; Acleris emargana blackmorei Obraztsov, 1963; Rhacodia emergana f. fuscana Sheldon, 1930; Acleris stettinensis Leraut, 2003

= Acleris effractana =

Species of moth

Acleris effractana, the hook-winged tortrix moth, is a moth of the family Tortricidae. It was described by Jacob Hübner in 1799. It has a Holarctic distribution. In Europe, it is found from northern Europe to the northern part of central Europe. It is also present in north-western Russia, Japan, Canada and the northwestern United States.

It is very similar to Acleris emargana and has until recently been confused with this. The two species cannot be distinguished by external appearance, one must examine the genitalia.

It is a rather large, greyish moth. This species and Acleris emargana are easily recognized by the fact that the forewing has a pronounced, round indentation in the costal part. It looks like a round piece has been cut out of the wing. The outer edge is also markedly indented so that the wing is sickle-shaped.

Much of the biology of this species is poorly known because it is so difficult to distinguish from the probably more common species Acleris emargana. The adult butterflies fly between July and October. The larvae develop between spun leaves of different willow species (Salix spp.
