= Phaneta bimaculata =

Scientific classification
- Domain: Eukaryota
- Kingdom: Animalia
- Phylum: Arthropoda
- Class: Insecta
- Order: Lepidoptera
- Family: Tortricidae
- Genus: Phaneta
- Species: P. bimaculata

Binomial name
- Phaneta bimaculata (Kuznetzov, 1966)

Synonyms
- Astenodes bimaculata Kuznetsov, 1966

Species of moth

Phaneta bimaculata is a species of moth of the family Tortricidae. It is found in China (Jiangxi), Japan and the Russian Far East.
