= Atethmia obscura =

Scientific classification
- Kingdom: Animalia
- Phylum: Arthropoda
- Class: Insecta
- Order: Lepidoptera
- Superfamily: Noctuoidea
- Family: Noctuidae
- Genus: Atethmia
- Species: A. obscura

Binomial name
- Atethmia obscura Osthelder, 1933

Species of moth

Atethmia obscura is a moth of the family Noctuidae. It is found in Turkey.
