= Atethmia sinuata =

Scientific classification
- Kingdom: Animalia
- Phylum: Arthropoda
- Clade: Pancrustacea
- Class: Insecta
- Order: Lepidoptera
- Superfamily: Noctuoidea
- Family: Noctuidae
- Genus: Atethmia
- Species: A. sinuata

Binomial name
- Atethmia sinuata L.Ronkay & Gyulai, 2006

Species of moth

Atethmia sinuata is a moth of the family Noctuidae. It is found in Iran.
