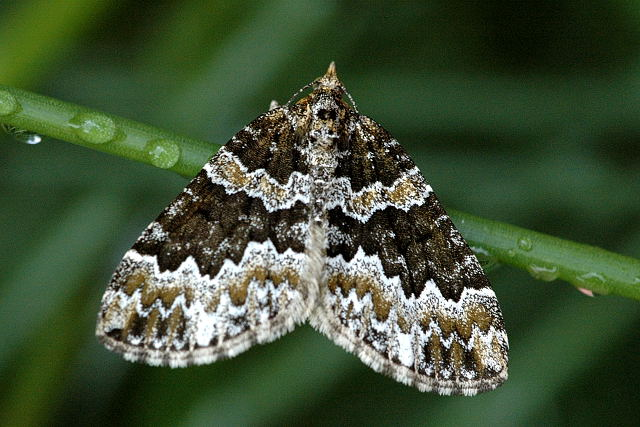
- Broken-barred carpet, Electrophaes corylata

Scientific classification
- Kingdom: Animalia
- Phylum: Arthropoda
- Class: Insecta
- Order: Lepidoptera
- Family: Geometridae
- Tribe: Cidariini
- Genus: Electrophaes; Prout, 1923

= Electrophaes =

Genus of moths

Electrophaes is a genus of geometer moths in the Larentiinae subfamily.

== Species ==
- Electrophaes aggrediens Prout, 1940
- Electrophaes albipunctaria (Leech, 1897)
- Electrophaes aliena (Butler, 1880)
- Electrophaes aliena mesodonta Prout, 1940
- Electrophaes aspretifera (Prout, 1938)
- Electrophaes chimakaleparia (Oberthür, 1893)
- Electrophaes chrysophaës (Prout, 1923)
- Electrophaes corylata – broken-barred carpet (Thunberg, 1792)
- Electrophaes cryopetra Prout, 1940
- Electrophaes cyria Prout, 1940
- Electrophaes ephoria Prout, 1940
- Electrophaes euryleuca Prout, 1940
- Electrophaes fulgidaria (Leech, 1897)
- Electrophaes fulgidaria chrysodeta Prout, 1928
- Electrophaes intertexta (Warren, 1893)
- Electrophaes moltrechti Prout, 1940
- Electrophaes nigrifulvaria (Hampson, 1902)
- Electrophaes niveonotata (Warren, 1901)
- Electrophaes niveopicta (Warren, 1893)
- Electrophaes perpulchra (Butler, 1886)
- Electrophaes recens (Inoue, 1982)
- Electrophaes rhacophora (Prout, 1938)
- Electrophaes subochraria (Leech, 1897)
- Electrophaes taiwana Inoue, 1986
- Electrophaes tsermosaria (Oberthür, 1893)
- Electrophaes westi (Prout, 1931)
- Electrophaes zaphenges Prout, 1940
