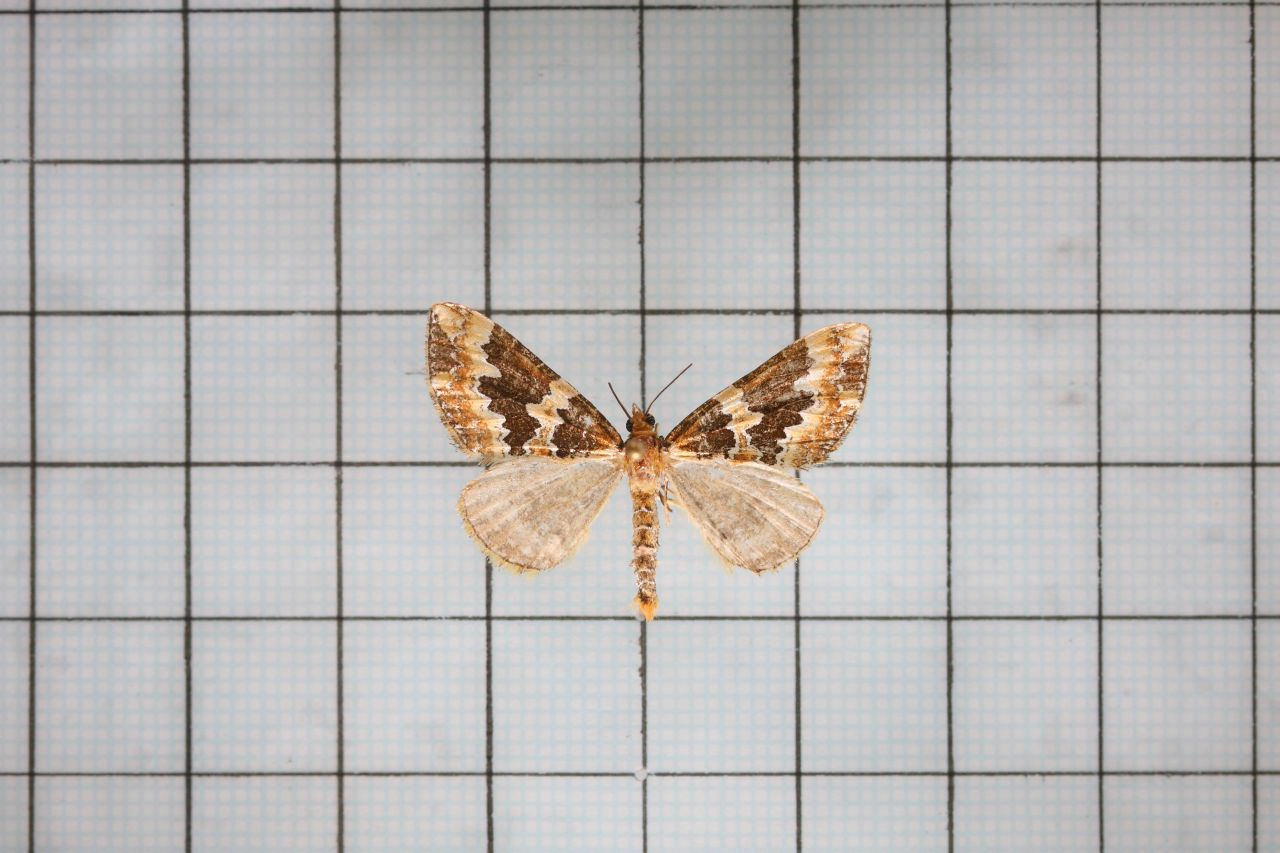

Scientific classification
- Kingdom: Animalia
- Phylum: Arthropoda
- Class: Insecta
- Order: Lepidoptera
- Family: Geometridae
- Genus: Electrophaes
- Species: E. taiwana

Binomial name
- Electrophaes taiwana Inoue, 1986

= Electrophaes taiwana =

Species of moth

Electrophaes taiwana is a moth in the family Geometridae first described by Hiroshi Inoue in 1986. It is found in Taiwan.

The wingspan is 25–26 mm.
