= Atethmia pinkeri =

Scientific classification
- Kingdom: Animalia
- Phylum: Arthropoda
- Class: Insecta
- Order: Lepidoptera
- Superfamily: Noctuoidea
- Family: Noctuidae
- Genus: Atethmia
- Species: A. pinkeri

Binomial name
- Atethmia pinkeri Boursin, 1970

Synonyms
- Evisa pinkeri

Species of moth

Atethmia pinkeri is a moth of the family Noctuidae. It is found in Turkey.
