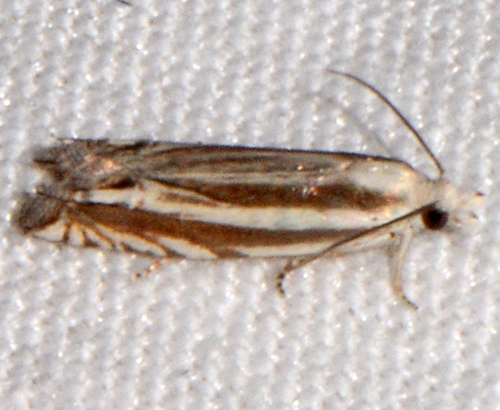
- Phaneta striatana

Scientific classification
- Domain: Eukaryota
- Kingdom: Animalia
- Phylum: Arthropoda
- Class: Insecta
- Order: Lepidoptera
- Family: Tortricidae
- Tribe: Eucosmini
- Genus: Phaneta; Stephens, 1852

Synonyms
- Astenodes Kuznetzov, 1966; Ioplocama Clemens, 1860; Joplocama Walker, 1864

= Phaneta =

Genus of tortrix moths

Phaneta is a genus of moths belonging to the subfamily Olethreutinae of the family Tortricidae.

== Species ==
- Phaneta alatana (McDunnough, 1938)
- Phaneta albertana (McDunnough, 1925)
- Phaneta altana (McDunnough, 1927)
- Phaneta ambodaidaleia Miller, 1983
- Phaneta amphorana (Walsingham, 1879)
- Phaneta annetteana (Kearfott, 1907)
- Phaneta apacheana (Walsingham, 1884)
- Phaneta argenticostana (Walsingham, 1879)
- Phaneta argutipunctana Blanchard & Knudson, 1983
- Phaneta artemisiana (Walsingham, 1879)
- Phaneta autochthones (Walsingham, 1897)
- Phaneta autumnana (McDunnough, 1942)
- Phaneta awemeana (Kearfott, 1907)
- Phaneta benjamini (Heinrich, 1923)
- Phaneta bimaculata (Kuznetzov, 1966)
- Phaneta bucephaloides (Walsingham, 1891)
- Phaneta camdenana (McDunnough, 1925)
- Phaneta canusana Wright, in Wright, Brown & Gibson, 1997
- Phaneta castrensis (McDunnough, 1929)
- Phaneta cetratana (Kennel, 1901)
- Phaneta cinereolineana (Heinrich, 1923)
- Phaneta citricolorana (McDunnough, 1942)
- Phaneta clarkei Blanchard & Knudson, 1983
- Phaneta clavana (Fernald, 1882)
- Phaneta columbiana (Walsingham, 1879)
- Phaneta complicana (McDunnough, 1925)
- Phaneta convergana (McDunnough, 1925)
- Phaneta corculana (Zeller, 1874)
- Phaneta crassana (McDunnough, 1938)
- Phaneta cruentana Blanchard & Knudson, 1982
- Phaneta decempunctana (Walsingham, 1879)
- Phaneta delphinoides (Heinrich, 1923)
- Phaneta delphinus (Heinrich, 1923)
- Phaneta dorsiatomana (Kearfott, 1905)
- Phaneta elongana (Walsingham, 1879)
- Phaneta essexana (Kearfott, 1907)
- Phaneta fasciculatana (McDunnough, 1938)
- Phaneta ferruginana (Fernald, 1882)
- Phaneta fertoriana (Heinrich, 1923)
- Phaneta festivana (Heinrich, 1923)
- Phaneta formosana (Clemens, 1860)
- Phaneta granulatana (Kearfott, 1908)
- Phaneta grindeliana (Busck, 1906)
- Phaneta griseocapitana (Walsingham, 1879)
- Phaneta implicata (Heinrich, 1931)
- Phaneta indagatricana (Heinrich, 1923)
- Phaneta indeterminana (McDunnough, 1925)
- Phaneta infimbriana (Dyar, 1904)
- Phaneta influana (Heinrich, 1923)
- Phaneta insignata (Heinrich, 1924)
- Phaneta kiscana (Kearfott, 1905)
- Phaneta kokana (Kearfott, 1907)
- Phaneta lapidana (Walsingham, 1879)
- Phaneta latens (Heinrich, 1929)
- Phaneta linitipunctana Blanchard & Knudson, 1983
- Phaneta marmontana (Kearfott, 1907)
- Phaneta mayelisana Blanchard, 1979
- Phaneta migratana (Heinrich, 1923)
- Phaneta minimana (Walsingham, 1879)
- Phaneta misturana (Heinrich, 1923)
- Phaneta modernana (McDunnough, 1925)
- Phaneta modicellana (Heinrich, 1923)
- Phaneta montanana (Walsingham, 1884)
- Phaneta mormonensis (Heinrich, 1923)
- Phaneta musetta Blanchard & Knudson, 1983
- Phaneta nepotinana (Heinrich, 1923)
- Phaneta ochrocephala (Walsingham, 1895)
- Phaneta ochroterminana (Kearfott, 1907)
- Phaneta octopunctana (Walsingham, 1895)
- Phaneta offectalis (Hulst, 1886)
- Phaneta olivaceana (Riley, 1881)
- Phaneta oregonensis (Heinrich, 1923)
- Phaneta ornatula (Heinrich, 1924)
- Phaneta pallidarcis (Heinrich, 1923)
- Phaneta pallidicostana (Walsingham, 1879)
- Phaneta parmatana (Clemens, 1860)
- Phaneta parvana (Walsingham, 1879)
- Phaneta pastigiata (Heinrich, 1929)
- Phaneta pauperana (Duponchel, in Godart, 1842)
- Phaneta perangustana (Walsingham, 1879)
- Phaneta pylonitis (Meyrick, 1932)
- Phaneta radiatana (Walsingham, 1879)
- Phaneta raracana (Kearfott, 1907)
- Phaneta refusana (Walker, 1863)
- Phaneta rupestrana (McDunnough, 1925)
- Phaneta salmicolorana (Heinrich, 1923)
- Phaneta sardoensis (Rebel, 1935)
- Phaneta scalana (Walsingham, 1879)
- Phaneta scotiana (McDunnough, 1958)
- Phaneta segregata (Heinrich, 1924)
- Phaneta setonana (McDunnough, 1927)
- Phaneta southamptonensis (Heinrich, 1935)
- Phaneta spectana (McDunnough, 1938)
- Phaneta spiculana (Zeller, 1875)
- Phaneta stramineana (Walsingham, 1879)
- Phaneta striatana (Clemens, 1860)
- Phaneta sublapidana (Walsingham, 1879)
- Phaneta subminimana (Heinrich, 1923)
- Phaneta tarandana (Moschler, 1874)
- Phaneta tenuiana (Walsingham, 1879)
- Phaneta tomonana (Kearfott, 1907)
- Phaneta transversa (Walsingham, 1895)
- Phaneta umbrastriana (Kearfott, 1907)
- Phaneta umbraticana (Heinrich, 1923)
- Phaneta verecundana Blanchard, 1980
- Phaneta verna Miller, 1971
- Phaneta vernalana (McDunnough, 1942)
- Phaneta verniochreana (Heinrich, 1923)
- Phaneta youngi (McDunnough, 1925)

== See also ==
- List of Tortricidae genera
