= James Wadmore =

English art collector

James Wadmore (4 October 1782 – 24 December 1853), was an English connoisseur.

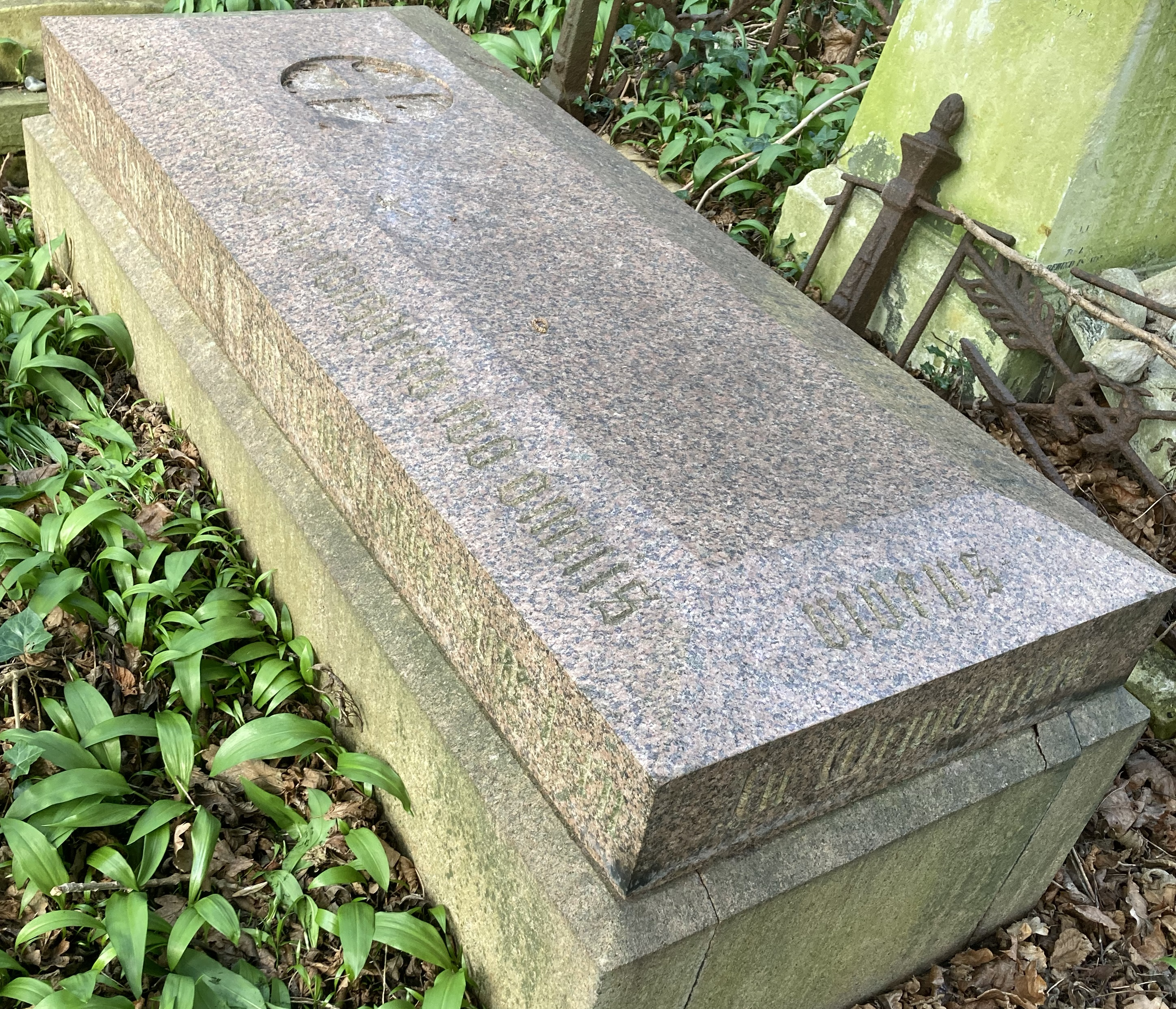
Grave of James Wadmore in Highgate Cemetery

Wadmore was born on 4 October 1782 in the Hampstead Road, London. His father, also called James Wadmore, worked in the Stamp Office. His son, on leaving a school near Greta Bridge, Yorkshire, obtained a place in the same office, which he resigned to become a land-surveyor. On finishing his apprenticeship, he set up on his own account at Lisson Grove. He began early in life to collect pictures, and his first purchase of importance was Richard Westall's Hagar and Ishmael. In 1815 he inherited a fortune from an uncle, and moved to 40 Chapel Street, Paddington, where he collected pictures by modern English artists, Turner, Wilkie, Webster and others, and also by old masters including St. John in the Wilderness then attributed to Leonardo da Vinci. He formed a good collection of English watercolours, as well as manuscripts, prints and books including a proof copy of John Curtis's British Entomology. He was a member of the Skinners' Company.

Wadmore passed the later years of his life at Grosvenor Lodge, Upper Clapton, where he died on 24 December 1853. He was buried on the western side of Highgate Cemetery. His pictures, 186 in number, of which seventy-five were by old masters, the remainder by modern English painters, were sold at Christie's on 5 and 6 May 1854. The older pictures, with the exception of three by Ruysdael, Dow, and Carracci, fetched small prices. The English collection contained Vincent's masterpiece, Greenwich Hospital from the River, with other works by the same painter, and three important Turners - Cologne, Dieppe Harbour and Guardship at the Nore - which realised over five thousand guineas.
