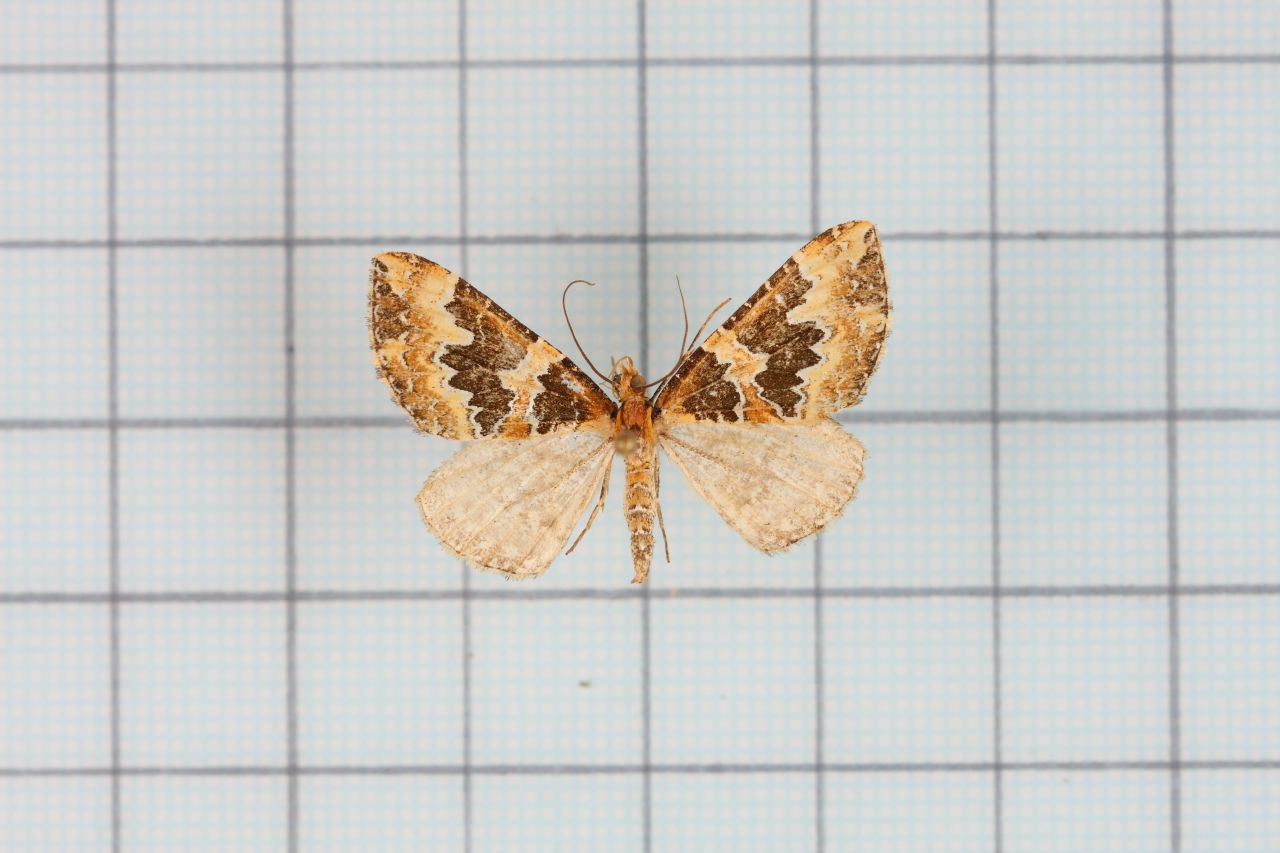

Scientific classification
- Kingdom: Animalia
- Phylum: Arthropoda
- Clade: Pancrustacea
- Class: Insecta
- Order: Lepidoptera
- Family: Geometridae
- Genus: Electrophaes
- Species: E. zaphenges

Binomial name
- Electrophaes zaphenges L. B. Prout, 1940

= Electrophaes zaphenges =

Species of moth

Electrophaes zaphenges is a moth of the family Geometridae first described by Louis Beethoven Prout in 1940. It is found in Taiwan.

The wingspan is 29–38 mm.
