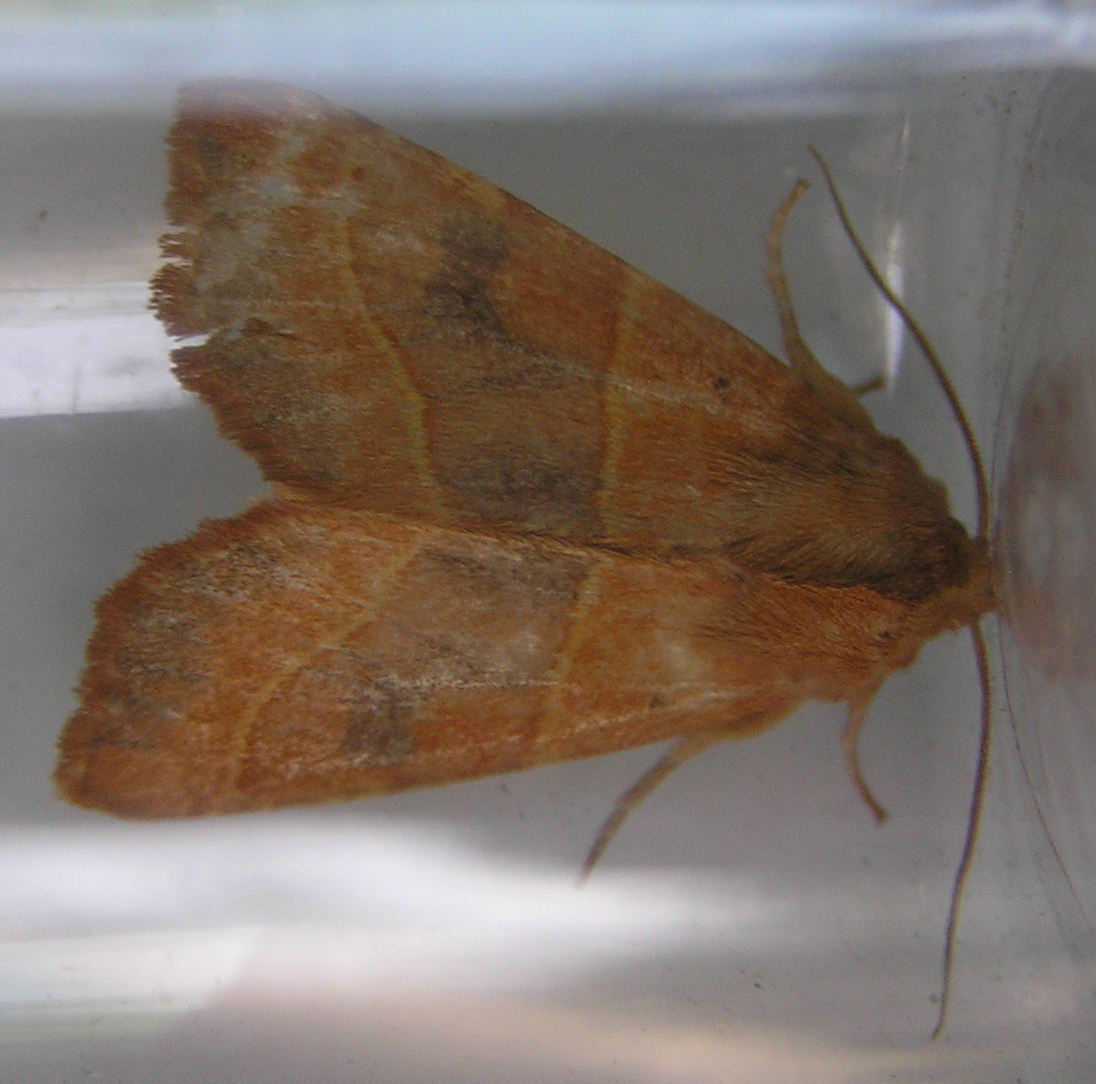
- Atethmia centrago

Scientific classification
- Kingdom: Animalia
- Phylum: Arthropoda
- Clade: Pancrustacea
- Class: Insecta
- Order: Lepidoptera
- Superfamily: Noctuoidea
- Family: Noctuidae
- Subtribe: Cosmiina
- Genus: Atethmia; Hübner, [1821]

Synonyms
- Brachycosmia Bulter, 1890

= Atethmia =

Genus of moths

Atethmia is a genus of moths of the family Noctuidae. The genus was erected by Jacob Hübner in 1821.

== Species ==
- Atethmia algirica (Culot, 1917)
- Atethmia ambusta (Denis & Schiffermüller, 1775)
- Atethmia centrago (Haworth, 1809) – center-barred sallow
- Atethmia obscura Osthelder, 1933
- Atethmia pinkeri (Boursin, 1970)
- Atethmia sinuata L.Ronkay & Gyulai, 2006
