= List of Lepidoptera of Greece =

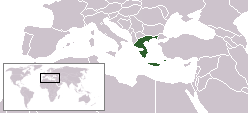
Location of Greece

Lepidoptera of Greece consist of both the butterflies and moths recorded from Greece, including Crete, the Greek mainland and the Aegean Islands (including the Cyclades and Dodecanese).

== Butterflies ==
=== Hesperiidae ===
- Carcharodus alceae (Esper, 1780)
- Carcharodus floccifera (Zeller, 1847)
- Carcharodus lavatherae (Esper, 1783)
- Carcharodus orientalis Reverdin, 1913
- Carcharodus stauderi Reverdin, 1913
- Carterocephalus palaemon (Pallas, 1771)
- Erynnis marloyi (Boisduval, 1834)
- Erynnis tages (Linnaeus, 1758)
- Gegenes nostrodamus (Fabricius, 1793)
- Gegenes pumilio (Hoffmannsegg, 1804)
- Hesperia comma (Linnaeus, 1758)
- Muschampia proto (Ochsenheimer, 1808)
- Muschampia tessellum (Hübner, 1803)
- Ochlodes sylvanus (Esper, 1777)
- Pelopidas thrax (Hübner, 1821)
- Pyrgus alveus (Hübner, 1803)
- Pyrgus armoricanus (Oberthur, 1910)
- Pyrgus carthami (Hübner, 1813)
- Pyrgus cinarae (Rambur, 1839)
- Pyrgus malvae (Linnaeus, 1758)
- Pyrgus serratulae (Rambur, 1839)
- Pyrgus sidae (Esper, 1784)
- Spialia orbifer (Hübner, 1823)
- Spialia phlomidis (Herrich-Schäffer, 1845)
- Thymelicus acteon (Rottemburg, 1775)
- Thymelicus hyrax (Lederer, 1861)
- Thymelicus lineola (Ochsenheimer, 1808)
- Thymelicus sylvestris (Poda, 1761)

=== Lycaenidae ===
- Agriades dardanus (Freyer, 1844)
- Aricia agestis (Denis & Schiffermüller, 1775)
- Aricia anteros (Freyer, 1838)
- Aricia artaxerxes (Fabricius, 1793)
- Callophrys rubi (Linnaeus, 1758)
- Celastrina argiolus (Linnaeus, 1758)
- Cupido minimus (Fuessly, 1775)
- Cupido osiris (Meigen, 1829)
- Cupido alcetas (Hoffmannsegg, 1804)
- Cupido argiades (Pallas, 1771)
- Cupido decolorata (Staudinger, 1886)
- Cyaniris semiargus (Rottemburg, 1775)
- Eumedonia eumedon (Esper, 1780)
- Favonius quercus (Linnaeus, 1758)
- Freyeria trochylus (Freyer, 1845)
- Glaucopsyche alexis (Poda, 1761)
- Iolana iolas (Ochsenheimer, 1816)
- Kretania eurypilus (Freyer, 1851)
- Kretania psylorita (Freyer, 1845)
- Kretania sephirus (Frivaldzky, 1835)
- Lampides boeticus (Linnaeus, 1767)
- Leptotes pirithous (Linnaeus, 1767)
- Lycaena alciphron (Rottemburg, 1775)
- Lycaena candens (Herrich-Schäffer, 1844)
- Lycaena dispar (Haworth, 1802)
- Lycaena ottomanus (Lefebvre, 1830)
- Lycaena phlaeas (Linnaeus, 1761)
- Lycaena thersamon (Esper, 1784)
- Lycaena thetis Klug, 1834
- Lycaena tityrus (Poda, 1761)
- Lycaena virgaureae (Linnaeus, 1758)
- Lysandra bellargus (Rottemburg, 1775)
- Lysandra coridon (Poda, 1761)
- Neolysandra coelestina (Eversmann, 1843)
- Phengaris alcon (Denis & Schiffermüller, 1775)
- Phengaris arion (Linnaeus, 1758)
- Plebejidea loewii (Zeller, 1847)
- Plebejus argus (Linnaeus, 1758)
- Plebejus argyrognomon (Bergstrasser, 1779)
- Plebejus idas (Linnaeus, 1761)
- Polyommatus admetus (Esper, 1783)
- Polyommatus andronicus Coutsis & Gavalas, 1995
- Polyommatus aroaniensis (Brown, 1976)
- Polyommatus lurae Parmentier, Vila & Lukhtanov, 2022
- Polyommatus damon (Denis & Schiffermüller, 1775)
- Polyommatus iphigenia (Herrich-Schäffer, 1847)
- Polyommatus nephohiptamenos (Brown & Coutsis, 1978)
- Polyommatus orphicus Kolev, 2005
- Polyommatus ripartii (Freyer, 1830)
- Polyommatus daphnis (Denis & Schiffermüller, 1775)
- Polyommatus amandus (Schneider, 1792)
- Polyommatus dorylas (Denis & Schiffermüller, 1775)
- Polyommatus eros (Ochsenheimer, 1808)
- Polyommatus escheri (Hübner, 1823)
- Polyommatus icarus (Rottemburg, 1775)
- Polyommatus thersites (Cantener, 1835)
- Polyommatus timfristos Lukhtanov, Vishnevskaya & Shapoval, 2016
- Pseudophilotes bavius (Eversmann, 1832)
- Pseudophilotes vicrama (Moore, 1865)
- Satyrium acaciae (Fabricius, 1787)
- Satyrium ilicis (Esper, 1779)
- Satyrium ledereri (Boisduval, 1848)
- Satyrium pruni (Linnaeus, 1758)
- Satyrium spini (Denis & Schiffermüller, 1775)
- Satyrium w-album (Knoch, 1782)
- Scolitantides orion (Pallas, 1771)
- Tarucus balkanica (Freyer, 1844)
- Thecla betulae (Linnaeus, 1758)
- Turanana panagea (Herrich-Schäffer, 1851)
- Turanana taygetica (Rebel, 1902)
- Zizeeria karsandra (Moore, 1865)

=== Riodinidae ===
- Hamearis lucina (Linnaeus, 1758)

=== Nymphalidae ===
- Aglais io (Linnaeus, 1758)
- Aglais urticae (Linnaeus, 1758)
- Apatura ilia (Denis & Schiffermüller, 1775)
- Apatura iris (Linnaeus, 1758)
- Apatura metis Freyer, 1829
- Aphantopus hyperantus (Linnaeus, 1758)
- Araschnia levana (Linnaeus, 1758)
- Arethusana arethusa (Denis & Schiffermüller, 1775)
- Argynnis paphia (Linnaeus, 1758)
- Argynnis pandora (Denis & Schiffermüller, 1775)
- Boloria graeca (Staudinger, 1870)
- Boloria dia (Linnaeus, 1767)
- Boloria euphrosyne (Linnaeus, 1758)
- Brenthis daphne (Bergstrasser, 1780)
- Brenthis hecate (Denis & Schiffermüller, 1775)
- Brintesia circe (Fabricius, 1775)
- Charaxes jasius (Linnaeus, 1767)
- Chazara briseis (Linnaeus, 1764)
- Coenonympha arcania (Linnaeus, 1761)
- Coenonympha glycerion (Borkhausen, 1788)
- Coenonympha leander (Esper, 1784)
- Coenonympha orientalis Rebel, 1910
- Coenonympha pamphilus (Linnaeus, 1758)
- Coenonympha rhodopensis Elwes, 1900
- Coenonympha thyrsis (Freyer, 1845)
- Danaus chrysippus (Linnaeus, 1758)
- Erebia aethiops (Esper, 1777)
- Erebia cassioides (Reiner & Hochenwarth, 1792)
- Erebia epiphron (Knoch, 1783)
- Erebia euryale (Esper, 1805)
- Erebia ligea (Linnaeus, 1758)
- Erebia medusa (Denis & Schiffermüller, 1775)
- Erebia melas (Herbst, 1796)
- Erebia oeme (Hübner, 1804)
- Erebia ottomana Herrich-Schäffer, 1847
- Erebia rhodopensis Nicholl, 1900
- Fabriciana adippe (Denis & Schiffermüller, 1775)
- Fabriciana niobe (Linnaeus, 1758)
- Euphydryas aurinia (Rottemburg, 1775)
- Hipparchia fagi (Scopoli, 1763)
- Hipparchia syriaca (Staudinger, 1871)
- Hipparchia fatua Freyer, 1844
- Hipparchia statilinus (Hufnagel, 1766)
- Hipparchia christenseni Kudrna, 1977
- Hipparchia cretica (Rebel, 1916)
- Hipparchia mersina (Staudinger, 1871)
- Hipparchia pellucida (Stauder, 1923)
- Hipparchia senthes (Fruhstorfer, 1908)
- Hipparchia volgensis (Mazochin-Porshnjakov, 1952)
- Hyponephele lupinus (O. Costa, 1836)
- Hyponephele lycaon (Rottemburg, 1775)
- Issoria lathonia (Linnaeus, 1758)
- Kirinia climene (Esper, 1783)
- Kirinia roxelana (Cramer, 1777)
- Lasiommata maera (Linnaeus, 1758)
- Lasiommata megera (Linnaeus, 1767)
- Lasiommata petropolitana (Fabricius, 1787)
- Libythea celtis (Laicharting, 1782)
- Limenitis camilla (Linnaeus, 1764)
- Limenitis populi (Linnaeus, 1758)
- Limenitis reducta Staudinger, 1901
- Maniola chia Thomson, 1987
- Maniola halicarnassus Thomson, 1990
- Maniola jurtina (Linnaeus, 1758)
- Maniola megala (Oberthur, 1909)
- Maniola telmessia (Zeller, 1847)
- Melanargia galathea (Linnaeus, 1758)
- Melanargia larissa (Geyer, 1828)
- Melanargia russiae (Esper, 1783)
- Melitaea arduinna (Esper, 1783)
- Melitaea athalia (Rottemburg, 1775)
- Melitaea aurelia Nickerl, 1850
- Melitaea cinxia (Linnaeus, 1758)
- Melitaea didyma (Esper, 1778)
- Melitaea phoebe (Denis & Schiffermüller, 1775)
- Melitaea trivia (Denis & Schiffermüller, 1775)
- Minois dryas (Scopoli, 1763)
- Neptis rivularis (Scopoli, 1763)
- Neptis sappho (Pallas, 1771)
- Nymphalis antiopa (Linnaeus, 1758)
- Nymphalis polychloros (Linnaeus, 1758)
- Nymphalis xanthomelas (Esper, 1781)
- Pararge aegeria (Linnaeus, 1758)
- Polygonia c-album (Linnaeus, 1758)
- Polygonia egea (Cramer, 1775)
- Proterebia afra (Fabricius, 1787)
- Pseudochazara amymone Brown, 1976
- Pseudochazara anthelea (Hübner, 1824)
- Pseudochazara cingovskii Gross, 1973
- Pseudochazara geyeri (Herrich-Schäffer, 1846)
- Pseudochazara graeca (Staudinger, 1870)
- Pseudochazara orestes De Prins & van der Poorten, 1981
- Pyronia cecilia (Vallantin, 1894)
- Pyronia tithonus (Linnaeus, 1767)
- Satyrus ferula (Fabricius, 1793)
- Speyeria aglaja (Linnaeus, 1758)
- Vanessa atalanta (Linnaeus, 1758)
- Vanessa cardui (Linnaeus, 1758)
- Ypthima asterope (Klug, 1832)

=== Papilionidae ===
- Archon apollinus (Herbst, 1798)
- Iphiclides podalirius (Linnaeus, 1758)
- Papilio alexanor Esper, 1800
- Papilio machaon Linnaeus, 1758
- Parnassius apollo (Linnaeus, 1758)
- Parnassius mnemosyne (Linnaeus, 1758)
- Zerynthia cerisy (Godart, 1824)
- Zerynthia cretica (Rebel, 1904)
- Zerynthia polyxena (Denis & Schiffermüller, 1775)

=== Pieridae ===
- Anthocharis cardamines (Linnaeus, 1758)
- Anthocharis damone Boisduval, 1836
- Anthocharis gruneri Herrich-Schäffer, 1851
- Aporia crataegi (Linnaeus, 1758)
- Colias alfacariensis Ribbe, 1905
- Colias aurorina Herrich-Schäffer, 1850
- Colias caucasica Staudinger, 1871
- Colias croceus (Fourcroy, 1785)
- Colias erate (Esper, 1805)
- Euchloe penia (Freyer, 1851)
- Euchloe ausonia (Hübner, 1804)
- Gonepteryx cleopatra (Linnaeus, 1767)
- Gonepteryx farinosa (Zeller, 1847)
- Gonepteryx rhamni (Linnaeus, 1758)
- Leptidea duponcheli (Staudinger, 1871)
- Leptidea sinapis (Linnaeus, 1758)
- Pieris balcana Lorkovic, 1970
- Pieris brassicae (Linnaeus, 1758)
- Pieris ergane (Geyer, 1828)
- Pieris krueperi Staudinger, 1860
- Pieris mannii (Mayer, 1851)
- Pieris napi (Linnaeus, 1758)
- Pieris rapae (Linnaeus, 1758)
- Pontia chloridice (Hübner, 1813)
- Pontia edusa (Fabricius, 1777)

== Moths ==
=== Adelidae ===
- Adela croesella (Scopoli, 1763)
- Adela mazzolella (Hübner, 1801)
- Adela paludicolella Zeller, 1850
- Adela repetitella Mann, 1861
- Cauchas anatolica (Rebel, 1902)
- Cauchas leucocerella (Scopoli, 1763)
- Cauchas rufifrontella (Treitschke, 1833)
- Nematopogon pilella (Denis & Schiffermüller, 1775)
- Nematopogon robertella (Clerck, 1759)
- Nemophora barbatellus (Zeller, 1847)
- Nemophora dumerilella (Duponchel, 1839)
- Nemophora fasciella (Fabricius, 1775)
- Nemophora metallica (Poda, 1761)
- Nemophora minimella (Denis & Schiffermüller, 1775)
- Nemophora raddaella (Hübner, 1793)

=== Alucitidae ===
- Alucita hexadactyla Linnaeus, 1758
- Alucita huebneri Wallengren, 1859
- Alucita major (Rebel, 1906)
- Alucita palodactyla Zeller, 1847
- Alucita pectinata Scholz & Jackh, 1994
- Alucita zonodactyla Zeller, 1847

=== Argyresthiidae ===
- Argyresthia glaucinella Zeller, 1839
- Argyresthia hilfiella Rebel, 1910
- Argyresthia pruniella (Clerck, 1759)
- Argyresthia spinosella Stainton, 1849

=== Autostichidae ===
- Amselina cedestiella (Zeller, 1868)
- Amselina emir (Gozmány, 1961)
- Amselina kasyi (Gozmány, 1961)
- Amselina virgo (Gozmány, 1959)
- Apatema apolausticum Gozmány, 1996
- Apatema mediopallidum Walsingham, 1900
- Apatema sutteri Gozmány, 1997
- Apatema whalleyi (Popescu-Gorj & Capuse, 1965)
- Aprominta aga Gozmány, 1962
- Aprominta aperitta Gozmány, 1997
- Aprominta argonauta Gozmány, 1964
- Aprominta atricanella (Rebel, 1906)
- Aprominta bifasciata (Staudinger, 1870)
- Aprominta designatella (Herrich-Schäffer, 1855)
- Aprominta gloriosa Gozmány, 1959
- Aprominta pannosella (Rebel, 1906)
- Aprominta reisseri Gozmány, 1959
- Aprominta separata Gozmány, 1961
- Aprominta tectaphella (Rebel, 1916)
- Aprominta xena Gozmány, 1959
- Charadraula cassandra Gozmány, 1967
- Deroxena venosulella (Moschler, 1862)
- Dysspastus baldizzonei Gozmány, 1977
- Dysspastus ios Gozmány, 2000
- Dysspastus musculina (Staudinger, 1870)
- Dysspastus undecimpunctella (Mann, 1864)
- Holcopogon bubulcellus (Staudinger, 1859)
- Nukusa cinerella (Rebel, 1941)
- Oecia oecophila (Staudinger, 1876)
- Oegoconia ariadne Gozmány, 1988
- Oegoconia caradjai Popescu-Gorj & Capuse, 1965
- Oegoconia deauratella (Herrich-Schäffer, 1854)
- Oegoconia novimundi (Busck, 1915)
- Oegoconia uralskella Popescu-Gorj & Capuse, 1965
- Pantacordis pantsa (Gozmány, 1963)
- Pantacordis scotinella (Rebel, 1916)
- Symmoca attalica Gozmány, 1957
- Symmoca christenseni Gozmány, 1982
- Symmoca signatella Herrich-Schäffer, 1854
- Symmoca signella (Hübner, 1796)
- Symmoca sutteri Gozmány, 2000
- Symmoca vitiosella Zeller, 1868
- Syringopais temperatella (Lederer, 1855)

=== Batrachedridae ===
- Batrachedra parvulipunctella Chrétien, 1915

=== Bedelliidae ===
- Bedellia somnulentella (Zeller, 1847)

=== Blastobasidae ===
- Blastobasis phycidella (Zeller, 1839)
- Tecmerium perplexum (Gozmány, 1957)

=== Brachodidae ===
- Brachodes beryti (Stainton, 1867)
- Brachodes compar (Staudinger, 1879)
- Brachodes nana (Treitschke, 1834)
- Brachodes pumila (Ochsenheimer, 1808)
- Brachodes tristis (Staudinger, 1879)

=== Brahmaeidae ===
- Lemonia balcanica (Herrich-Schäffer, 1847)
- Lemonia dumi (Linnaeus, 1761)
- Lemonia taraxaci (Denis & Schiffermüller, 1775)

=== Bucculatricidae ===
- Bucculatrix albedinella (Zeller, 1839)
- Bucculatrix albella Stainton, 1867
- Bucculatrix cretica Deschka, 1991
- Bucculatrix infans Staudinger, 1880
- Bucculatrix phagnalella Walsingham, 1908
- Bucculatrix ulmella Zeller, 1848

=== Carposinidae ===
- Carposina scirrhosella Herrich-Schäffer, 1854

=== Choreutidae ===
- Anthophila fabriciana (Linnaeus, 1767)
- Choreutis nemorana (Hübner, 1799)
- Choreutis pariana (Clerck, 1759)
- Prochoreutis myllerana (Fabricius, 1794)
- Prochoreutis stellaris (Zeller, 1847)
- Tebenna micalis (Mann, 1857)
- Tebenna pretiosana (Duponchel, 1842)

=== Cimeliidae ===
- Axia nesiota Reisser, 1962

=== Coleophoridae ===
- Augasma aeratella (Zeller, 1839)
- Coleophora achilleae Baldizzone, 2001
- Coleophora acrisella Milliere, 1872
- Coleophora adjectella Hering, 1937
- Coleophora adspersella Benander, 1939
- Coleophora aestuariella Bradley, 1984
- Coleophora afrosarda Baldizzone & Kaltenbach, 1983
- Coleophora alashiae Baldizzone, 1996
- Coleophora albella (Thunberg, 1788)
- Coleophora albicostella (Duponchel, 1842)
- Coleophora albidella (Denis & Schiffermüller, 1775)
- Coleophora albilineella Toll, 1960
- Coleophora alcyonipennella (Kollar, 1832)
- Coleophora aleramica Baldizzone & Stubner, 2007
- Coleophora alticolella Zeller, 1849
- Coleophora amethystinella Ragonot, 1855
- Coleophora anatipenella (Hübner, 1796)
- Coleophora asteris Muhlig, 1864
- Coleophora badiipennella (Duponchel, 1843)
- Coleophora ballotella (Fischer v. Röslerstamm, 1839)
- Coleophora basimaculella Mann, 1864
- Coleophora bilineatella Zeller, 1849
- Coleophora bilineella Herrich-Schäffer, 1855
- Coleophora breviuscula Staudinger, 1880
- Coleophora calycotomella Stainton, 1869
- Coleophora chamaedriella Bruand, 1852
- Coleophora christenseni Baldizzone, 1983
- Coleophora cnossiaca Baldizzone, 1983
- Coleophora coarctataephaga Toll, 1961
- Coleophora colutella (Fabricius, 1794)
- Coleophora congeriella Staudinger, 1859
- Coleophora conspicuella Zeller, 1849
- Coleophora conyzae Zeller, 1868
- Coleophora corsicella Walsingham, 1898
- Coleophora coxi Baldizzone & van der Wolf, 2007
- Coleophora crepidinella Zeller, 1847
- Coleophora cuprariella Lienig & Zeller, 1864
- Coleophora currucipennella Zeller, 1839
- Coleophora deauratella Lienig & Zeller, 1846
- Coleophora dentiferella Toll, 1952
- Coleophora depunctella Toll, 1961
- Coleophora deviella Zeller, 1847
- Coleophora dianthi Herrich-Schäffer, 1855
- Coleophora dignella Toll, 1961
- Coleophora discordella Zeller, 1849
- Coleophora drymidis Mann, 1857
- Coleophora epijudaica Amsel, 1935
- Coleophora eupepla Gozmány, 1954
- Coleophora filaginella Fuchs, 1881
- Coleophora flaviella Mann, 1857
- Coleophora follicularis (Vallot, 1802)
- Coleophora fretella Zeller, 1847
- Coleophora frischella (Linnaeus, 1758)
- Coleophora galbulipennella Zeller, 1838
- Coleophora genistae Stainton, 1857
- Coleophora graeca Baldizzone, 1990
- Coleophora granulatella Zeller, 1849
- Coleophora halophilella Zimmermann, 1926
- Coleophora hartigi Toll, 1944
- Coleophora helianthemella Milliere, 1870
- Coleophora helichrysiella Krone, 1909
- Coleophora hemerobiella (Scopoli, 1763)
- Coleophora hospitiella Chrétien, 1915
- Coleophora ibipennella Zeller, 1849
- Coleophora jerusalemella Toll, 1942
- Coleophora juncicolella Stainton, 1851
- Coleophora kautzi Rebel, 1933
- Coleophora klimeschiella Toll, 1952
- Coleophora kroneella Fuchs, 1899
- Coleophora laconiae Baldizzone, 1983
- Coleophora lassella Staudinger, 1859
- Coleophora lebedella Falkovitsh, 1982
- Coleophora limosipennella (Duponchel, 1843)
- Coleophora lineolea (Haworth, 1828)
- Coleophora longicornella Constant, 1893
- Coleophora luteolella Staudinger, 1880
- Coleophora lutipennella (Zeller, 1838)
- Coleophora maritimella Newman, 1863
- Coleophora mausolella Chrétien, 1908
- Coleophora mayrella (Hübner, 1813)
- Coleophora medelichensis Krone, 1908
- Coleophora meridionella Rebel, 1912
- Coleophora minoica Baldizzone, 1983
- Coleophora nesiotidella Baldizzone & v.d. Wolf, 2000
- Coleophora nigridorsella Amsel, 1935
- Coleophora nikiella Baldizzone, 1983
- Coleophora niveicostella Zeller, 1839
- Coleophora nutantella Muhlig & Frey, 1857
- Coleophora obtectella Zeller, 1849
- Coleophora ochrea (Haworth, 1828)
- Coleophora ochripennella Zeller, 1849
- Coleophora ochroflava Toll, 1961
- Coleophora olympica Baldizzone, 1983
- Coleophora onobrychiella Zeller, 1849
- Coleophora ononidella Milliere, 1879
- Coleophora onopordiella Zeller, 1849
- Coleophora oriolella Zeller, 1849
- Coleophora ornatipennella (Hübner, 1796)
- Coleophora paramayrella Nel, 1993
- Coleophora parthenica Meyrick, 1891
- Coleophora parvicuprella Baldizzone & Tabell, 2006
- Coleophora patzaki Baldizzone, 1983
- Coleophora pennella (Denis & Schiffermüller, 1775)
- Coleophora peribenanderi Toll, 1943
- Coleophora pseudodianthi Baldizzone & Tabell, 2006
- Coleophora pyrrhulipennella Zeller, 1839
- Coleophora quadristraminella Toll, 1961
- Coleophora qulikushella Toll, 1959
- Coleophora salicorniae Heinemann & Wocke, 1877
- Coleophora saxicolella (Duponchel, 1843)
- Coleophora semicinerea Staudinger, 1859
- Coleophora serinipennella Christoph, 1872
- Coleophora serpylletorum Hering, 1889
- Coleophora serratulella Herrich-Schäffer, 1855
- Coleophora soffneriella Toll, 1961
- Coleophora spartana Baldizzone, 2010
- Coleophora stramentella Zeller, 1849
- Coleophora taeniipennella Herrich-Schäffer, 1855
- Coleophora tamesis Waters, 1929
- Coleophora taurica Baldizzone, 1994
- Coleophora tauricella Staudinger, 1880
- Coleophora taygeti Baldizzone, 1983
- Coleophora therinella Tengstrom, 1848
- Coleophora thymi Hering, 1942
- Coleophora tricolor Walsingham, 1889
- Coleophora trifolii (Curtis, 1832)
- Coleophora tyrrhaenica Amsel, 1951
- Coleophora valesianella Zeller, 1849
- Coleophora variicornis Toll, 1952
- Coleophora versurella Zeller, 1849
- Coleophora vicinella Zeller, 1849
- Coleophora virgatella Zeller, 1849
- Coleophora zelleriella Heinemann, 1854
- Goniodoma auroguttella (Fischer v. Röslerstamm, 1841)
- Goniodoma limoniella (Stainton, 1884)
- Goniodoma nemesi Capuse, 1970

=== Cosmopterigidae ===
- Alloclita recisella Staudinger, 1859
- Anatrachyntis badia (Hodges, 1962)
- Ascalenia vanella (Frey, 1860)
- Coccidiphila gerasimovi Danilevsky, 1950
- Cosmopterix athesiae Huemer & Koster, 2006
- Cosmopterix coryphaea Walsingham, 1908
- Cosmopterix crassicervicella Chrétien, 1896
- Cosmopterix lienigiella Zeller, 1846
- Cosmopterix pararufella Riedl, 1976
- Cosmopterix pulchrimella Chambers, 1875
- Eteobalea albiapicella (Duponchel, 1843)
- Eteobalea anonymella (Riedl, 1965)
- Eteobalea dohrnii (Zeller, 1847)
- Eteobalea intermediella (Riedl, 1966)
- Eteobalea isabellella (O. G. Costa, 1836)
- Eteobalea serratella (Treitschke, 1833)
- Eteobalea sumptuosella (Lederer, 1855)
- Hodgesiella rebeli (Krone, 1905)
- Limnaecia phragmitella Stainton, 1851
- Pancalia leuwenhoekella (Linnaeus, 1761)
- Pancalia nodosella (Bruand, 1851)
- Pancalia schwarzella (Fabricius, 1798)
- Pyroderces argyrogrammos (Zeller, 1847)
- Pyroderces caesaris Gozmány, 1957
- Ramphis libanoticus Riedl, 1969
- Sorhagenia lophyrella (Douglas, 1846)
- Sorhagenia reconditella Riedl, 1983
- Vulcaniella cognatella Riedl, 1990
- Vulcaniella grabowiella (Staudinger, 1859)
- Vulcaniella grandiferella Sinev, 1986
- Vulcaniella klimeschi (Riedl, 1966)
- Vulcaniella pomposella (Zeller, 1839)
- Vulcaniella rosmarinella (Walsingham, 1891)

=== Cossidae ===
- Acossus terebra (Denis & Schiffermüller, 1775)
- Cossus cossus (Linnaeus, 1758)
- Danielostygia persephone Reisser, 1962
- Dyspessa aphrodite Yakovlev & Witt, 2007
- Dyspessa salicicola (Eversmann, 1848)
- Dyspessa ulula (Borkhausen, 1790)
- Parahypopta caestrum (Hübner, 1808)
- Paropta paradoxus (Herrich-Schäffer, 1851)
- Phragmacossia albida (Erschoff, 1874)
- Phragmacossia minos Reisser, 1962
- Phragmataecia castaneae (Hübner, 1790)
- Stygia mosulensis Daniel, 1965
- Stygoides colchica (Herrich-Schäffer, 1851)
- Zeuzera pyrina (Linnaeus, 1761)

=== Crambidae ===
- Achyra nudalis (Hübner, 1796)
- Aeschremon disparalis (Herrich-Schäffer, 1851)
- Agriphila beieri Błeszyński, 1953
- Agriphila brioniellus (Zerny, 1914)
- Agriphila cyrenaicellus (Ragonot, 1887)
- Agriphila dalmatinellus (Hampson, 1900)
- Agriphila geniculea (Haworth, 1811)
- Agriphila indivisellus (Turati & Zanon, 1922)
- Agriphila inquinatella (Denis & Schiffermüller, 1775)
- Agriphila latistria (Haworth, 1811)
- Agriphila paleatellus (Zeller, 1847)
- Agriphila selasella (Hübner, 1813)
- Agriphila tersellus (Lederer, 1855)
- Agriphila tolli (Błeszyński, 1952)
- Agriphila trabeatellus (Herrich-Schäffer, 1848)
- Agriphila tristella (Denis & Schiffermüller, 1775)
- Agrotera nemoralis (Scopoli, 1763)
- Anania coronata (Hufnagel, 1767)
- Anania crocealis (Hübner, 1796)
- Anania funebris (Strom, 1768)
- Anania hortulata (Linnaeus, 1758)
- Anania lancealis (Denis & Schiffermüller, 1775)
- Anania stachydalis (Germar, 1821)
- Anania testacealis (Zeller, 1847)
- Anania verbascalis (Denis & Schiffermüller, 1775)
- Anarpia incertalis (Duponchel, 1832)
- Ancylolomia disparalis Hübner, 1825
- Ancylolomia palpella (Denis & Schiffermüller, 1775)
- Ancylolomia pectinatellus (Zeller, 1847)
- Ancylolomia tentaculella (Hübner, 1796)
- Angustalius malacellus (Duponchel, 1836)
- Anthophilopsis baphialis (Staudinger, 1871)
- Antigastra catalaunalis (Duponchel, 1833)
- Aporodes floralis (Hübner, 1809)
- Calamotropha aureliellus (Fischer v. Röslerstamm, 1841)
- Calamotropha hackeri Ganev, 1985
- Calamotropha hierichuntica Zeller, 1867
- Calamotropha paludella (Hübner, 1824)
- Cataclysta lemnata (Linnaeus, 1758)
- Cataonia erubescens (Christoph, 1877)
- Catoptria acutangulellus (Herrich-Schäffer, 1847)
- Catoptria casalei Bassi, 1999
- Catoptria confusellus (Staudinger, 1882)
- Catoptria dimorphellus (Staudinger, 1882)
- Catoptria falsella (Denis & Schiffermüller, 1775)
- Catoptria fibigeri Ganev, 1987
- Catoptria fulgidella (Hübner, 1813)
- Catoptria gozmanyi Błeszyński, 1956
- Catoptria languidellus (Zeller, 1863)
- Catoptria margaritella (Denis & Schiffermüller, 1775)
- Catoptria myella (Hübner, 1796)
- Catoptria mytilella (Hübner, 1805)
- Catoptria olympica Ganev, 1983
- Catoptria pinella (Linnaeus, 1758)
- Chilo luteellus (Motschulsky, 1866)
- Cholius luteolaris (Scopoli, 1772)
- Chrysocrambus craterella (Scopoli, 1763)
- Chrysocrambus linetella (Fabricius, 1781)
- Chrysoteuchia culmella (Linnaeus, 1758)
- Cornifrons ulceratalis Lederer, 1858
- Crambus lathoniellus (Zincken, 1817)
- Crambus pascuella (Linnaeus, 1758)
- Crambus perlella (Scopoli, 1763)
- Crambus pratella (Linnaeus, 1758)
- Crambus uliginosellus Zeller, 1850
- Cybalomia pentadalis (Lederer, 1855)
- Cynaeda dentalis (Denis & Schiffermüller, 1775)
- Cynaeda gigantea (Wocke, 1871)
- Dentifovea fulvifascialis (Christoph, 1887)
- Diasemia reticularis (Linnaeus, 1761)
- Diasemiopsis ramburialis (Duponchel, 1834)
- Dolicharthria bruguieralis (Duponchel, 1833)
- Dolicharthria metasialis (Rebel, 1916)
- Dolicharthria punctalis (Denis & Schiffermüller, 1775)
- Dolicharthria stigmosalis (Herrich-Schäffer, 1848)
- Donacaula forficella (Thunberg, 1794)
- Donacaula mucronella (Denis & Schiffermüller, 1775)
- Donacaula niloticus (Zeller, 1867)
- Duponchelia fovealis Zeller, 1847
- Ecpyrrhorrhoe diffusalis (Guenée, 1854)
- Ecpyrrhorrhoe rubiginalis (Hübner, 1796)
- Elophila nymphaeata (Linnaeus, 1758)
- Elophila rivulalis (Duponchel, 1834)
- Epascestria pustulalis (Hübner, 1823)
- Ephelis cruentalis (Geyer, 1832)
- Euchromius bella (Hübner, 1796)
- Euchromius bleszynskiellus Popescu-Gorj, 1964
- Euchromius ocellea (Haworth, 1811)
- Euchromius rayatellus (Amsel, 1949)
- Euchromius superbellus (Zeller, 1849)
- Euchromius vinculellus (Zeller, 1847)
- Euclasta splendidalis (Herrich-Schäffer, 1848)
- Eudonia angustea (Curtis, 1827)
- Eudonia delunella (Stainton, 1849)
- Eudonia lacustrata (Panzer, 1804)
- Eudonia laetella (Zeller, 1846)
- Eudonia mercurella (Linnaeus, 1758)
- Eudonia murana (Curtis, 1827)
- Eudonia phaeoleuca (Zeller, 1846)
- Eudonia speideli Leraut, 1982
- Eurrhypis cacuminalis (Eversmann, 1843)
- Eurrhypis guttulalis (Herrich-Schäffer, 1848)
- Eurrhypis pollinalis (Denis & Schiffermüller, 1775)
- Evergestis aenealis (Denis & Schiffermüller, 1775)
- Evergestis caesialis (Herrich-Schäffer, 1849)
- Evergestis desertalis (Hübner, 1813)
- Evergestis extimalis (Scopoli, 1763)
- Evergestis frumentalis (Linnaeus, 1761)
- Evergestis infirmalis (Staudinger, 1871)
- Evergestis isatidalis (Duponchel, 1833)
- Evergestis limbata (Linnaeus, 1767)
- Evergestis mundalis (Guenée, 1854)
- Evergestis nomadalis (Lederer, 1871)
- Evergestis serratalis (Staudinger, 1871)
- Evergestis sophialis (Fabricius, 1787)
- Evergestis subfuscalis (Staudinger, 1871)
- Glaucocharis euchromiella (Ragonot, 1895)
- Heliothela wulfeniana (Scopoli, 1763)
- Hellula undalis (Fabricius, 1781)
- Hodebertia testalis (Fabricius, 1794)
- Hydriris ornatalis (Duponchel, 1832)
- Hyperlais argillacealis (Zeller, 1847)
- Hyperlais dulcinalis (Treitschke, 1835)
- Hyperlais nemausalis (Duponchel, 1834)
- Loxostege aeruginalis (Hübner, 1796)
- Loxostege deliblatica Szent-Ivany & Uhrik-Meszaros, 1942
- Loxostege manualis (Geyer, 1832)
- Loxostege sticticalis (Linnaeus, 1761)
- Loxostege turbidalis (Treitschke, 1829)
- Mecyna asinalis (Hübner, 1819)
- Mecyna flavalis (Denis & Schiffermüller, 1775)
- Mecyna lutealis (Duponchel, 1833)
- Mecyna subsequalis (Herrich-Schäffer, 1851)
- Mecyna trinalis (Denis & Schiffermüller, 1775)
- Mesocrambus candiellus (Herrich-Schäffer, 1848)
- Metacrambus carectellus (Zeller, 1847)
- Metaeuchromius lata (Staudinger, 1870)
- Metasia carnealis (Treitschke, 1829)
- Metasia ophialis (Treitschke, 1829)
- Metasia rosealis Ragonot, 1895
- Metasia suppandalis (Hübner, 1823)
- Metaxmeste phrygialis (Hübner, 1796)
- Metaxmeste schrankiana (Hochenwarth, 1785)
- Neocrambus wolfschlaegeri (Schawerda, 1937)
- Nomophila noctuella (Denis & Schiffermüller, 1775)
- Ostrinia nubilalis (Hübner, 1796)
- Palpita vitrealis (Rossi, 1794)
- Paracorsia repandalis (Denis & Schiffermüller, 1775)
- Parapoynx stagnalis (Zeller, 1852)
- Parapoynx stratiotata (Linnaeus, 1758)
- Paratalanta hyalinalis (Hübner, 1796)
- Pediasia contaminella (Hübner, 1796)
- Pediasia fascelinella (Hübner, 1813)
- Pediasia jucundellus (Herrich-Schäffer, 1847)
- Pediasia luteella (Denis & Schiffermüller, 1775)
- Pediasia matricella (Treitschke, 1832)
- Platytes cerussella (Denis & Schiffermüller, 1775)
- Pleuroptya balteata (Fabricius, 1798)
- Pleuroptya ruralis (Scopoli, 1763)
- Psammotis pulveralis (Hübner, 1796)
- Pyrausta aerealis (Hübner, 1793)
- Pyrausta aurata (Scopoli, 1763)
- Pyrausta castalis Treitschke, 1829
- Pyrausta cingulata (Linnaeus, 1758)
- Pyrausta despicata (Scopoli, 1763)
- Pyrausta obfuscata (Scopoli, 1763)
- Pyrausta purpuralis (Linnaeus, 1758)
- Pyrausta sanguinalis (Linnaeus, 1767)
- Pyrausta trimaculalis (Staudinger, 1867)
- Pyrausta virginalis Duponchel, 1832
- Scirpophaga praelata (Scopoli, 1763)
- Scoparia ambigualis (Treitschke, 1829)
- Scoparia basistrigalis Knaggs, 1866
- Scoparia dicteella Rebel, 1916
- Scoparia ganevi Leraut, 1985
- Scoparia graeca Nuss, 2005
- Scoparia ingratella (Zeller, 1846)
- Scoparia manifestella (Herrich-Schäffer, 1848)
- Scoparia perplexella (Zeller, 1839)
- Scoparia pyralella (Denis & Schiffermüller, 1775)
- Scoparia staudingeralis (Mabille, 1869)
- Scoparia subfusca Haworth, 1811
- Sitochroa palealis (Denis & Schiffermüller, 1775)
- Sitochroa verticalis (Linnaeus, 1758)
- Tegostoma comparalis (Hübner, 1796)
- Thisanotia chrysonuchella (Scopoli, 1763)
- Thyridiphora furia (Swinhoe, 1884)
- Titanio normalis (Hübner, 1796)
- Titanio venustalis (Lederer, 1855)
- Udea austriacalis (Herrich-Schäffer, 1851)
- Udea bipunctalis (Herrich-Schäffer, 1851)
- Udea confinalis (Lederer, 1858)
- Udea ferrugalis (Hübner, 1796)
- Udea fimbriatralis (Duponchel, 1834)
- Udea fulvalis (Hübner, 1809)
- Udea institalis (Hübner, 1819)
- Udea languidalis (Eversmann, 1842)
- Udea numeralis (Hübner, 1796)
- Udea olivalis (Denis & Schiffermüller, 1775)
- Udea prunalis (Denis & Schiffermüller, 1775)
- Udea rhododendronalis (Duponchel, 1834)
- Uresiphita gilvata (Fabricius, 1794)
- Usgentia vespertalis (Herrich-Schäffer, 1851)
- Xanthocrambus saxonellus (Zincken, 1821)

=== Douglasiidae ===
- Klimeschia cinereipunctella (Turati & Fiori, 1930)
- Klimeschia transversella (Zeller, 1839)
- Tinagma anchusella (Benander, 1936)
- Tinagma klimeschi Gaedike, 1987
- Tinagma ocnerostomella (Stainton, 1850)

=== Drepanidae ===
- Asphalia ruficollis (Denis & Schiffermüller, 1775)
- Cilix asiatica O. Bang-Haas, 1907
- Cilix glaucata (Scopoli, 1763)
- Cymatophorina diluta (Denis & Schiffermüller, 1775)
- Drepana falcataria (Linnaeus, 1758)
- Falcaria lacertinaria (Linnaeus, 1758)
- Habrosyne pyritoides (Hufnagel, 1766)
- Sabra harpagula (Esper, 1786)
- Tethea ocularis (Linnaeus, 1767)
- Tethea or (Denis & Schiffermüller, 1775)
- Thyatira batis (Linnaeus, 1758)
- Watsonalla binaria (Hufnagel, 1767)
- Watsonalla cultraria (Fabricius, 1775)
- Watsonalla uncinula (Borkhausen, 1790)

=== Elachistidae ===
- Agonopterix adspersella (Kollar, 1832)
- Agonopterix alstromeriana (Clerck, 1759)
- Agonopterix arenella (Denis & Schiffermüller, 1775)
- Agonopterix assimilella (Treitschke, 1832)
- Agonopterix atomella (Denis & Schiffermüller, 1775)
- Agonopterix cnicella (Treitschke, 1832)
- Agonopterix comitella (Lederer, 1855)
- Agonopterix furvella (Treitschke, 1832)
- Agonopterix graecella Hannemann, 1976
- Agonopterix inoxiella Hannemann, 1959
- Agonopterix irrorata (Staudinger, 1870)
- Agonopterix leucadensis (Rebel, 1932)
- Agonopterix nanatella (Stainton, 1849)
- Agonopterix nervosa (Haworth, 1811)
- Agonopterix pallorella (Zeller, 1839)
- Agonopterix propinquella (Treitschke, 1835)
- Agonopterix purpurea (Haworth, 1811)
- Agonopterix rotundella (Douglas, 1846)
- Agonopterix rutana (Fabricius, 1794)
- Agonopterix scopariella (Heinemann, 1870)
- Agonopterix straminella (Staudinger, 1859)
- Agonopterix subpropinquella (Stainton, 1849)
- Agonopterix thapsiella (Zeller, 1847)
- Agonopterix yeatiana (Fabricius, 1781)
- Anchinia laureolella Herrich-Schäffer, 1854
- Blastodacna atra (Haworth, 1828)
- Blastodacna hellerella (Duponchel, 1838)
- Blastodacna vinolentella (Herrich-Schäffer, 1854)
- Cacochroa corfuella Lvovsky, 2000
- Cacochroa permixtella (Herrich-Schäffer, 1854)
- Depressaria absynthiella Herrich-Schäffer, 1865
- Depressaria albipunctella (Denis & Schiffermüller, 1775)
- Depressaria badiella (Hübner, 1796)
- Depressaria beckmanni Heinemann, 1870
- Depressaria chaerophylli Zeller, 1839
- Depressaria daucella (Denis & Schiffermüller, 1775)
- Depressaria depressana (Fabricius, 1775)
- Depressaria discipunctella Herrich-Schäffer, 1854
- Depressaria douglasella Stainton, 1849
- Depressaria floridella Mann, 1864
- Depressaria hofmanni Stainton, 1861
- Depressaria marcella Rebel, 1901
- Depressaria tenebricosa Zeller, 1854
- Depressaria ultimella Stainton, 1849
- Depressaria velox Staudinger, 1859
- Depressaria veneficella Zeller, 1847
- Depressaria hirtipalpis Zeller, 1854
- Dystebenna stephensi (Stainton, 1849)
- Elachista antonia Kaila, 2007
- Elachista atrisquamosa Staudinger, 1880
- Elachista catalana Parenti, 1978
- Elachista dalmatiensis Traugott-Olsen, 1992
- Elachista deceptricula Staudinger, 1880
- Elachista gangabella Zeller, 1850
- Elachista graeca Parenti, 2002
- Elachista grotenfelti Kaila, 2012
- Elachista modesta Parenti, 1978
- Elachista neapolisella Traugott-Olsen, 1985
- Elachista nedaella Traugott-Olsen, 1985
- Elachista nuraghella Amsel, 1951
- Elachista occulta Parenti, 1978
- Elachista pollutella Duponchel, 1843
- Elachista rudectella Stainton, 1851
- Elachista skulei Traugott-Olsen, 1992
- Elachista subalbidella Schlager, 1847
- Elachista sutteri Kaila, 2002
- Elachista anatoliensis Traugott-Olsen, 1990
- Elachista kalki Parenti, 1978
- Elachista christenseni Traugott-Olsen, 2000
- Elachista falirakiensis Traugott-Olsen, 2000
- Elachista gleichenella (Fabricius, 1781)
- Elachista helia Kaila & Sruoga, 2014
- Elachista infuscata Frey, 1882
- Elachista kosteri Traugott-Olsen, 1995
- Elachista martinii O. Hofmann, 1898
- Elachista minuta (Parenti, 2003)
- Elachista occidentalis Frey, 1882
- Elachista pigerella (Herrich-Schäffer, 1854)
- Elachista rufocinerea (Haworth, 1828)
- Ethmia aurifluella (Hübner, 1810)
- Ethmia bipunctella (Fabricius, 1775)
- Ethmia candidella (Alphéraky, 1908)
- Ethmia chrysopyga (Zeller, 1844)
- Ethmia distigmatella (Erschoff, 1874)
- Ethmia fumidella (Wocke, 1850)
- Ethmia haemorrhoidella (Eversmann, 1844)
- Ethmia iranella Zerny, 1940
- Ethmia mariannae Karsholt & Kun, 2003
- Ethmia pusiella (Linnaeus, 1758)
- Ethmia quadrinotella (Mann, 1861)
- Ethmia terminella T. B. Fletcher, 1938
- Exaeretia conciliatella (Rebel, 1892)
- Exaeretia nigromaculata Hannemann, 1989
- Haplochrois albanica (Rebel & Zerny, 1932)
- Haplochrois gelechiella (Rebel, 1902)
- Haplochrois ochraceella (Rebel, 1903)
- Heinemannia festivella (Denis & Schiffermüller, 1775)
- Hypercallia citrinalis (Scopoli, 1763)
- Luquetia orientella (Rebel, 1893)
- Orophia sordidella (Hübner, 1796)
- Perittia echiella (de Joannis, 1902)
- Perittia minitaurella Kaila, 2009
- Perittia mucronata (Parenti, 2001)
- Perittia ravida Kaila, 2009
- Stephensia staudingeri Nielsen & Traugott-Olsen, 1981

=== Epermeniidae ===
- Epermenia aequidentellus (E. Hofmann, 1867)
- Epermenia chaerophyllella (Goeze, 1783)
- Epermenia insecurella (Stainton, 1854)
- Epermenia petrusellus (Heylaerts, 1883)
- Epermenia strictellus (Wocke, 1867)
- Epermenia iniquellus (Wocke, 1867)
- Epermenia ochreomaculellus (Milliere, 1854)
- Epermenia pontificella (Hübner, 1796)
- Ochromolopis ictella (Hübner, 1813)
- Ochromolopis staintonellus (Milliere, 1869)

=== Erebidae ===
- Acantholipes regularis (Hübner, 1813)
- Amata kruegeri (Ragusa, 1904)
- Amata phegea (Linnaeus, 1758)
- Apopestes spectrum (Esper, 1787)
- Araeopteron ecphaea Hampson, 1914
- Arctia caja (Linnaeus, 1758)
- Arctia festiva (Hufnagel, 1766)
- Arctia villica (Linnaeus, 1758)
- Arctornis l-nigrum (Muller, 1764)
- Autophila asiatica (Staudinger, 1888)
- Autophila banghaasi Boursin, 1940
- Autophila dilucida (Hübner, 1808)
- Autophila libanotica (Staudinger, 1901)
- Autophila limbata (Staudinger, 1871)
- Autophila anaphanes Boursin, 1940
- Autophila ligaminosa (Eversmann, 1851)
- Callimorpha dominula (Linnaeus, 1758)
- Calliteara pudibunda (Linnaeus, 1758)
- Calymma communimacula (Denis & Schiffermüller, 1775)
- Calyptra thalictri (Borkhausen, 1790)
- Catephia alchymista (Denis & Schiffermüller, 1775)
- Catocala brandti Hacker, 1999
- Catocala coniuncta (Esper, 1787)
- Catocala conversa (Esper, 1783)
- Catocala dilecta (Hübner, 1808)
- Catocala disjuncta (Geyer, 1828)
- Catocala diversa (Geyer, 1828)
- Catocala electa (Vieweg, 1790)
- Catocala elocata (Esper, 1787)
- Catocala eutychea Treitschke, 1835
- Catocala hymenaea (Denis & Schiffermüller, 1775)
- Catocala lupina Herrich-Schäffer, 1851
- Catocala nupta (Linnaeus, 1767)
- Catocala nymphaea (Esper, 1787)
- Catocala nymphagoga (Esper, 1787)
- Catocala promissa (Denis & Schiffermüller, 1775)
- Catocala puerpera (Giorna, 1791)
- Catocala separata Freyer, 1848
- Catocala sponsa (Linnaeus, 1767)
- Chelis maculosa (Gerning, 1780)
- Clytie syriaca (Bugnion, 1837)
- Colobochyla salicalis (Denis & Schiffermüller, 1775)
- Coscinia striata (Linnaeus, 1758)
- Cybosia mesomella (Linnaeus, 1758)
- Cymbalophora pudica (Esper, 1785)
- Cymbalophora rivularis (Menetries, 1832)
- Diacrisia sannio (Linnaeus, 1758)
- Diaphora luctuosa (Hübner, 1831)
- Diaphora mendica (Clerck, 1759)
- Dicallomera fascelina (Linnaeus, 1758)
- Drasteria cailino (Lefebvre, 1827)
- Dysauxes ancilla (Linnaeus, 1767)
- Dysauxes famula (Freyer, 1836)
- Dysauxes punctata (Fabricius, 1781)
- Dysgonia algira (Linnaeus, 1767)
- Dysgonia torrida (Guenée, 1852)
- Eilema caniola (Hübner, 1808)
- Eilema complana (Linnaeus, 1758)
- Eilema costalis (Zeller, 1847)
- Eilema depressa (Esper, 1787)
- Eilema lurideola (Zincken, 1817)
- Eilema muscula (Staudinger, 1899)
- Eilema palliatella (Scopoli, 1763)
- Eilema pseudocomplana (Daniel, 1939)
- Eilema pygmaeola (Doubleday, 1847)
- Eilema rungsi Toulgoët, 1960
- Eilema sororcula (Hufnagel, 1766)
- Eublemma amoena (Hübner, 1803)
- Eublemma candidana (Fabricius, 1794)
- Eublemma cochylioides (Guenée, 1852)
- Eublemma minutata (Fabricius, 1794)
- Eublemma ochreola (Staudinger, 1900)
- Eublemma ostrina (Hübner, 1808)
- Eublemma panonica (Freyer, 1840)
- Eublemma parva (Hübner, 1808)
- Eublemma polygramma (Duponchel, 1842)
- Eublemma pudorina (Staudinger, 1889)
- Eublemma purpurina (Denis & Schiffermüller, 1775)
- Eublemma rosea (Hübner, 1790)
- Eublemma scitula Rambur, 1833
- Eublemma straminea (Staudinger, 1892)
- Eublemma viridula (Guenée, 1841)
- Eublemma zillii Fibiger, Ronkay & Yela, 2010
- Euclidia mi (Clerck, 1759)
- Euclidia glyphica (Linnaeus, 1758)
- Euclidia triquetra (Denis & Schiffermüller, 1775)
- Euplagia quadripunctaria (Poda, 1761)
- Euproctis chrysorrhoea (Linnaeus, 1758)
- Euproctis similis (Fuessly, 1775)
- Exophyla rectangularis (Geyer, 1828)
- Grammodes bifasciata (Petagna, 1787)
- Grammodes stolida (Fabricius, 1775)
- Herminia tarsicrinalis (Knoch, 1782)
- Honeyania ragusana (Freyer, 1844)
- Hypena lividalis (Hübner, 1796)
- Hypena munitalis Mann, 1861
- Hypena obesalis Treitschke, 1829
- Hypena obsitalis (Hübner, 1813)
- Hypena palpalis (Hübner, 1796)
- Hypena proboscidalis (Linnaeus, 1758)
- Hypena rostralis (Linnaeus, 1758)
- Hypenodes anatolica Schwingenschuss, 1938
- Hypenodes nesiota Rebel, 1916
- Hyphantria cunea (Drury, 1773)
- Idia calvaria (Denis & Schiffermüller, 1775)
- Laelia coenosa (Hübner, 1808)
- Laspeyria flexula (Denis & Schiffermüller, 1775)
- Leucoma salicis (Linnaeus, 1758)
- Lithosia quadra (Linnaeus, 1758)
- Lygephila amasina (Staudinger, 1878)
- Lygephila craccae (Denis & Schiffermüller, 1775)
- Lygephila lusoria (Linnaeus, 1758)
- Lygephila procax (Hübner, 1813)
- Lygephila viciae (Hübner, 1822)
- Lymantria dispar (Linnaeus, 1758)
- Lymantria monacha (Linnaeus, 1758)
- Macrochilo cribrumalis (Hübner, 1793)
- Metachrostis dardouini (Boisduval, 1840)
- Metachrostis velocior (Staudinger, 1892)
- Metachrostis velox (Hübner, 1813)
- Micronoctua karsholti Fibiger, 1997
- Miltochrista miniata (Forster, 1771)
- Minucia lunaris (Denis & Schiffermüller, 1775)
- Nodaria nodosalis (Herrich-Schäffer, 1851)
- Ocneria eos Reisser, 1962
- Ocneria ledereri (Milliere, 1869)
- Ocneria rubea (Denis & Schiffermüller, 1775)
- Ocnogyna loewii (Zeller, 1846)
- Ocnogyna parasita (Hübner, 1790)
- Odice arcuinna (Hübner, 1790)
- Odice suava (Hübner, 1813)
- Ophiusa tirhaca (Cramer, 1773)
- Orectis massiliensis (Milliere, 1864)
- Orectis proboscidata (Herrich-Schäffer, 1851)
- Orgyia antiqua (Linnaeus, 1758)
- Paidia cinerascens (Herrich-Schäffer, 1847)
- Paidia minoica de Freina, 2006
- Paidia rica (Freyer, 1858)
- Pandesma robusta (Walker, 1858)
- Paracolax tristalis (Fabricius, 1794)
- Parascotia detersa (Staudinger, 1891)
- Parascotia fuliginaria (Linnaeus, 1761)
- Parasemia plantaginis (Linnaeus, 1758)
- Parocneria detrita (Esper, 1785)
- Parocneria terebinthi (Freyer, 1838)
- Pechipogo plumigeralis Hübner, 1825
- Pelosia muscerda (Hufnagel, 1766)
- Pelosia obtusa (Herrich-Schäffer, 1852)
- Pericyma albidentaria (Freyer, 1842)
- Phragmatobia fuliginosa (Linnaeus, 1758)
- Phragmatobia placida (Frivaldszky, 1835)
- Phytometra viridaria (Clerck, 1759)
- Polypogon tentacularia (Linnaeus, 1758)
- Raparna conicephala (Staudinger, 1870)
- Rhypagla lacernaria (Hübner, 1813)
- Rhyparia purpurata (Linnaeus, 1758)
- Rivula sericealis (Scopoli, 1763)
- Rivula tanitalis Rebel, 1912
- Schrankia costaestrigalis (Stephens, 1834)
- Scoliopteryx libatrix (Linnaeus, 1758)
- Setina irrorella (Linnaeus, 1758)
- Simplicia rectalis (Eversmann, 1842)
- Spilosoma lubricipeda (Linnaeus, 1758)
- Spilosoma lutea (Hufnagel, 1766)
- Spilosoma urticae (Esper, 1789)
- Tathorhynchus exsiccata (Lederer, 1855)
- Tyria jacobaeae (Linnaeus, 1758)
- Utetheisa pulchella (Linnaeus, 1758)
- Watsonarctia deserta (Bartel, 1902)
- Zanclognatha lunalis (Scopoli, 1763)
- Zanclognatha zelleralis (Wocke, 1850)
- Zebeeba falsalis (Herrich-Schäffer, 1839)
- Zekelita ravalis (Herrich-Schäffer, 1851)
- Zekelita antiqualis (Hübner, 1809)
- Zethes insularis Rambur, 1833

=== Eriocraniidae ===
- Dyseriocrania subpurpurella (Haworth, 1828)

=== Euteliidae ===
- Eutelia adoratrix (Staudinger, 1892)
- Eutelia adulatrix (Hübner, 1813)

=== Gelechiidae ===
- Acompsia cinerella (Clerck, 1759)
- Acompsia ponomarenkoae Huemer & Karsholt, 2002
- Agnippe lunaki (Rebel, 1941)
- Altenia elsneriella Huemer & Karsholt, 1999
- Altenia modesta (Danilevsky, 1955)
- Altenia scriptella (Hübner, 1796)
- Altenia wagneriella (Rebel, 1926)
- Anacampsis malella Amsel, 1959
- Anacampsis obscurella (Denis & Schiffermüller, 1775)
- Anacampsis scintillella (Fischer von Röslerstamm, 1841)
- Anacampsis timidella (Wocke, 1887)
- Anarsia lineatella Zeller, 1839
- Anarsia spartiella (Schrank, 1802)
- Apodia bifractella (Duponchel, 1843)
- Aproaerema anthyllidella (Hübner, 1813)
- Aristotelia brizella (Treitschke, 1833)
- Aristotelia decurtella (Hübner, 1813)
- Aristotelia ericinella (Zeller, 1839)
- Aristotelia subericinella (Duponchel, 1843)
- Aroga aristotelis (Milliere, 1876)
- Aroga balcanicola Huemer & Karsholt, 1999
- Aroga velocella (Duponchel, 1838)
- Athrips amoenella (Frey, 1882)
- Athrips rancidella (Herrich-Schäffer, 1854)
- Atremaea lonchoptera Staudinger, 1871
- Brachmia blandella (Fabricius, 1798)
- Bryotropha affinis (Haworth, 1828)
- Bryotropha arabica Amsel, 1952
- Bryotropha azovica Bidzilia, 1997
- Bryotropha desertella (Douglas, 1850)
- Bryotropha domestica (Haworth, 1828)
- Bryotropha dryadella (Zeller, 1850)
- Bryotropha figulella (Staudinger, 1859)
- Bryotropha hendrikseni Karsholt & Rutten, 2005
- Bryotropha hulli Karsholt & Rutten, 2005
- Bryotropha plebejella (Zeller, 1847)
- Bryotropha sabulosella (Rebel, 1905)
- Bryotropha sattleri Nel, 2003
- Bryotropha senectella (Zeller, 1839)
- Bryotropha sutteri Karsholt & Rutten, 2005
- Bryotropha tachyptilella (Rebel, 1916)
- Bryotropha terrella (Denis & Schiffermüller, 1775)
- Carpatolechia aenigma (Sattler, 1983)
- Carpatolechia decorella (Haworth, 1812)
- Carpatolechia fugitivella (Zeller, 1839)
- Caryocolum alsinella (Zeller, 1868)
- Caryocolum amaurella (M. Hering, 1924)
- Caryocolum baischi Huemer & Karsholt, 2010
- Caryocolum blandella (Douglas, 1852)
- Caryocolum blandelloides Karsholt, 1981
- Caryocolum blandulella (Tutt, 1887)
- Caryocolum cauligenella (Schmid, 1863)
- Caryocolum confluens Huemer, 1988
- Caryocolum crypticum Huemer, Karsholt & Mutanen, 2014
- Caryocolum fibigerium Huemer, 1988
- Caryocolum hispanicum Huemer, 1988
- Caryocolum junctella (Douglas, 1851)
- Caryocolum leucomelanella (Zeller, 1839)
- Caryocolum marmorea (Haworth, 1828)
- Caryocolum moehringiae (Klimesch, 1954)
- Caryocolum mucronatella (Chrétien, 1900)
- Caryocolum peregrinella (Herrich-Schäffer, 1854)
- Caryocolum provinciella (Stainton, 1869)
- Caryocolum proxima (Haworth, 1828)
- Caryocolum saginella (Zeller, 1868)
- Caryocolum schleichi (Christoph, 1872)
- Caryocolum tischeriella (Zeller, 1839)
- Caryocolum vicinella (Douglas, 1851)
- Catatinagma trivittellum Rebel, 1903
- Caulastrocecis pudicellus (Mann, 1861)
- Chionodes distinctella (Zeller, 1839)
- Chionodes electella (Zeller, 1839)
- Chionodes fumatella (Douglas, 1850)
- Chrysoesthia drurella (Fabricius, 1775)
- Chrysoesthia sexguttella (Thunberg, 1794)
- Cosmardia moritzella (Treitschke, 1835)
- Crossobela trinotella (Herrich-Schäffer, 1856)
- Deltophora maculata (Staudinger, 1879)
- Dichomeris acuminatus (Staudinger, 1876)
- Dichomeris alacella (Zeller, 1839)
- Dichomeris lamprostoma (Zeller, 1847)
- Dichomeris limbipunctellus (Staudinger, 1859)
- Dichomeris marginella (Fabricius, 1781)
- Dichomeris ustalella (Fabricius, 1794)
- Dirhinosia arnoldiella (Rebel, 1905)
- Ephysteris deserticolella (Staudinger, 1871)
- Ephysteris diminutella (Zeller, 1847)
- Ephysteris iberica Povolny, 1977
- Ephysteris olympica Povolny, 1968
- Ephysteris promptella (Staudinger, 1859)
- Epidola barcinonella Milliere, 1867
- Epidola stigma Staudinger, 1859
- Eulamprotes graecatella Šumpich & Skyva, 2012
- Eulamprotes helotella (Staudinger, 1859)
- Eulamprotes nigromaculella (Milliere, 1872)
- Eulamprotes wilkella (Linnaeus, 1758)
- Exoteleia dodecella (Linnaeus, 1758)
- Filatima spurcella (Duponchel, 1843)
- Gelechia dujardini Huemer, 1991
- Gelechia mediterranea Huemer, 1991
- Gelechia nigra (Haworth, 1828)
- Gelechia sabinellus (Zeller, 1839)
- Gelechia scotinella Herrich-Schäffer, 1854
- Gelechia senticetella (Staudinger, 1859)
- Gelechia sororculella (Hübner, 1817)
- Gnorimoschema soffneri Riedl, 1965
- Harpagidia magnetella (Staudinger, 1871)
- Helcystogramma lutatella (Herrich-Schäffer, 1854)
- Helcystogramma rufescens (Haworth, 1828)
- Helcystogramma triannulella (Herrich-Schäffer, 1854)
- Isophrictis anthemidella (Wocke, 1871)
- Isophrictis kefersteiniellus (Zeller, 1850)
- Isophrictis lineatellus (Zeller, 1850)
- Isophrictis striatella (Denis & Schiffermüller, 1775)
- Istrianis femoralis (Staudinger, 1876)
- Istrianis myricariella (Frey, 1870)
- Klimeschiopsis kiningerella (Duponchel, 1843)
- Lutilabria lutilabrella (Mann, 1857)
- Megacraspedus binotella (Duponchel, 1843)
- Megacraspedus cerussatellus Rebel, 1930
- Megacraspedus incertellus Rebel, 1930
- Megacraspedus separatellus (Fischer von Röslerstamm, 1843)
- Mesophleps corsicella Herrich-Schäffer, 1856
- Mesophleps ochracella (Turati, 1926)
- Mesophleps oxycedrella (Milliere, 1871)
- Mesophleps silacella (Hübner, 1796)
- Metzneria aestivella (Zeller, 1839)
- Metzneria agraphella (Ragonot, 1895)
- Metzneria aprilella (Herrich-Schäffer, 1854)
- Metzneria campicolella (Mann, 1857)
- Metzneria castiliella (Moschler, 1866)
- Metzneria diffusella Englert, 1974
- Metzneria intestinella (Mann, 1864)
- Metzneria lappella (Linnaeus, 1758)
- Metzneria metzneriella (Stainton, 1851)
- Metzneria neuropterella (Zeller, 1839)
- Metzneria paucipunctella (Zeller, 1839)
- Metzneria riadella Englert, 1974
- Metzneria tenuiella (Mann, 1864)
- Microlechia chretieni Turati, 1924
- Microlechia rhamnifoliae (Amsel & Hering, 1931)
- Mirificarma aflavella (Amsel, 1935)
- Mirificarma cytisella (Treitschke, 1833)
- Mirificarma eburnella (Denis & Schiffermüller, 1775)
- Mirificarma flavella (Duponchel, 1844)
- Mirificarma maculatella (Hübner, 1796)
- Mirificarma minimella Huemer & Karsholt, 2001
- Mirificarma mulinella (Zeller, 1839)
- Mirificarma rhodoptera (Mann, 1866)
- Monochroa cytisella (Curtis, 1837)
- Monochroa rumicetella (O. Hofmann, 1868)
- Monochroa tenebrella (Hübner, 1817)
- Neofriseria peliella (Treitschke, 1835)
- Neotelphusa cisti (Stainton, 1869)
- Neotelphusa sequax (Haworth, 1828)
- Nothris congressariella (Bruand, 1858)
- Nothris magna Nel & Peslier, 2007
- Nothris verbascella (Denis & Schiffermüller, 1775)
- Ochrodia subdiminutella (Stainton, 1867)
- Ornativalva heluanensis (Debski, 1913)
- Ornativalva plutelliformis (Staudinger, 1859)
- Palumbina guerinii (Stainton, 1858)
- Parastenolechia nigrinotella (Zeller, 1847)
- Pectinophora gossypiella (Saunders, 1844)
- Pexicopia malvella (Hübner, 1805)
- Phthorimaea operculella (Zeller, 1873)
- Platyedra subcinerea (Haworth, 1828)
- Pogochaetia solitaria Staudinger, 1879
- Prolita sexpunctella (Fabricius, 1794)
- Prolita solutella (Zeller, 1839)
- Pseudotelphusa istrella (Mann, 1866)
- Pseudotelphusa scalella (Scopoli, 1763)
- Psoricoptera gibbosella (Zeller, 1839)
- Ptocheuusa inopella (Zeller, 1839)
- Ptocheuusa paupella (Zeller, 1847)
- Pyncostola bohemiella (Nickerl, 1864)
- Recurvaria nanella (Denis & Schiffermüller, 1775)
- Schneidereria pistaciella Weber, 1957
- Scrobipalpa acuminatella (Sircom, 1850)
- Scrobipalpa artemisiella (Treitschke, 1833)
- Scrobipalpa atriplicella (Fischer von Röslerstamm, 1841)
- Scrobipalpa bigoti Povolny, 1973
- Scrobipalpa brahmiella (Heyden, 1862)
- Scrobipalpa bryophiloides Povolny, 1966
- Scrobipalpa camphorosmella Nel, 1999
- Scrobipalpa ergasima (Meyrick, 1916)
- Scrobipalpa gecho (Walsingham, 1911)
- Scrobipalpa hendrikseni Huemer & Karsholt, 2010
- Scrobipalpa instabilella (Douglas, 1846)
- Scrobipalpa kasyi Povolny, 1968
- Scrobipalpa obsoletella (Fischer von Röslerstamm, 1841)
- Scrobipalpa ocellatella (Boyd, 1858)
- Scrobipalpa perinii (Klimesch, 1951)
- Scrobipalpa phagnalella (Constant, 1895)
- Scrobipalpa proclivella (Fuchs, 1886)
- Scrobipalpa salinella (Zeller, 1847)
- Scrobipalpa samadensis (Pfaffenzeller, 1870)
- Scrobipalpa selectella (Caradja, 1920)
- Scrobipalpa spergulariella (Chrétien, 1910)
- Scrobipalpa vasconiella (Rossler, 1877)
- Scrobipalpa vicaria (Meyrick, 1921)
- Scrobipalpula psilella (Herrich-Schäffer, 1854)
- Scrobipalpula seniorum Povolny, 2000
- Scrobipalpula tussilaginis (Stainton, 1867)
- Sitotroga cerealella (Olivier, 1789)
- Sitotroga psacasta Meyrick, 1908
- Sophronia chilonella (Treitschke, 1833)
- Sophronia finitimella Rebel, 1905
- Sophronia humerella (Denis & Schiffermüller, 1775)
- Sophronia sicariellus (Zeller, 1839)
- Stenolechia gemmella (Linnaeus, 1758)
- Stenolechiodes macrolepiellus Huemer & Karsholt, 1999
- Stenolechiodes pseudogemmellus Elsner, 1996
- Stomopteryx basalis (Staudinger, 1876)
- Stomopteryx detersella (Zeller, 1847)
- Stomopteryx hungaricella Gozmány, 1957
- Stomopteryx remissella (Zeller, 1847)
- Streyella anguinella (Herrich-Schäffer, 1861)
- Syncopacma cinctella (Clerck, 1759)
- Syncopacma patruella (Mann, 1857)
- Syncopacma polychromella (Rebel, 1902)
- Syncopacma sangiella (Stainton, 1863)
- Syncopacma suecicella (Wolff, 1958)
- Teleiodes albiluculella Huemer & Karsholt, 2001
- Teleiodes luculella (Hübner, 1813)
- Teleiodes vulgella (Denis & Schiffermüller, 1775)
- Teleiopsis bagriotella (Duponchel, 1840)
- Teleiopsis diffinis (Haworth, 1828)
- Teleiopsis terebinthinella (Herrich-Schäffer, 1856)
- Telphusa cistiflorella (Constant, 1890)
- Thiotricha majorella (Rebel, 1910)
- Tuta absoluta (Meyrick, 1917)
- Xenolechia aethiops (Humphreys & Westwood, 1845)
- Xenolechia lindae Huemer & Karsholt, 1999
- Xenolechia pseudovulgella Huemer & Karsholt, 1999

=== Geometridae ===
- Abraxas grossulariata (Linnaeus, 1758)
- Acanthovalva inconspicuaria (Hübner, 1819)
- Acasis viretata (Hübner, 1799)
- Agriopis bajaria (Denis & Schiffermüller, 1775)
- Alcis jubata (Thunberg, 1788)
- Alcis repandata (Linnaeus, 1758)
- Aleucis orientalis (Staudinger, 1892)
- Alsophila aescularia (Denis & Schiffermüller, 1775)
- Amorphogynia necessaria (Zeller, 1849)
- Angerona prunaria (Linnaeus, 1758)
- Apeira syringaria (Linnaeus, 1758)
- Aplasta ononaria (Fuessly, 1783)
- Aplocera annexata (Freyer, 1830)
- Aplocera columbata (Metzner, 1845)
- Aplocera cretica (Reisser, 1974)
- Aplocera efformata (Guenée, 1858)
- Aplocera plagiata (Linnaeus, 1758)
- Aplocera praeformata (Hübner, 1826)
- Aplocera simpliciata (Treitschke, 1835)
- Apocheima hispidaria (Denis & Schiffermüller, 1775)
- Apochima flabellaria (Heeger, 1838)
- Ascotis selenaria (Denis & Schiffermüller, 1775)
- Asovia maeoticaria (Alphéraky, 1876)
- Aspitates ochrearia (Rossi, 1794)
- Asthena albulata (Hufnagel, 1767)
- Biston betularia (Linnaeus, 1758)
- Bupalus piniaria (Linnaeus, 1758)
- Cabera pusaria (Linnaeus, 1758)
- Campaea honoraria (Denis & Schiffermüller, 1775)
- Campaea margaritaria (Linnaeus, 1761)
- Camptogramma bilineata (Linnaeus, 1758)
- Camptogramma grisescens (Staudinger, 1892)
- Casilda antophilaria (Hübner, 1813)
- Cataclysme riguata (Hübner, 1813)
- Catarhoe basochesiata (Duponchel, 1831)
- Catarhoe hortulanaria (Staudinger, 1879)
- Catarhoe permixtaria (Herrich-Schäffer, 1856)
- Catarhoe putridaria (Herrich-Schäffer, 1852)
- Celonoptera mirificaria Lederer, 1862
- Chariaspilates formosaria (Eversmann, 1837)
- Charissa certhiatus (Rebel & Zerny, 1931)
- Charissa obscurata (Denis & Schiffermüller, 1775)
- Charissa mutilata (Staudinger, 1879)
- Charissa pullata (Denis & Schiffermüller, 1775)
- Charissa dubitaria (Staudinger, 1892)
- Charissa mucidaria (Hübner, 1799)
- Charissa variegata (Duponchel, 1830)
- Charissa ambiguata (Duponchel, 1830)
- Charissa onustaria (Herrich-Schäffer, 1852)
- Charissa zeitunaria (Staudinger, 1901)
- Charissa intermedia (Wehrli, 1917)
- Charissa supinaria (Mann, 1854)
- Charissa glaucinaria (Hübner, 1799)
- Chemerina caliginearia (Rambur, 1833)
- Chesias rufata (Fabricius, 1775)
- Chiasmia aestimaria (Hübner, 1809)
- Chiasmia clathrata (Linnaeus, 1758)
- Chiasmia syriacaria (Staudinger, 1871)
- Chlorissa cloraria (Hübner, 1813)
- Chlorissa viridata (Linnaeus, 1758)
- Chloroclysta siterata (Hufnagel, 1767)
- Chloroclystis v-ata (Haworth, 1809)
- Cidaria fulvata (Forster, 1771)
- Cleorodes lichenaria (Hufnagel, 1767)
- Cleta filacearia (Herrich-Schäffer, 1847)
- Coenotephria ablutaria (Boisduval, 1840)
- Colostygia aptata (Hübner, 1813)
- Colostygia aqueata (Hübner, 1813)
- Colostygia fitzi (Schawerda, 1914)
- Colostygia olivata (Denis & Schiffermüller, 1775)
- Colostygia wolfschlaegerae (Pinker, 1953)
- Colotois pennaria (Linnaeus, 1761)
- Comibaena bajularia (Denis & Schiffermüller, 1775)
- Cosmorhoe ocellata (Linnaeus, 1758)
- Costaconvexa polygrammata (Borkhausen, 1794)
- Crocallis elinguaria (Linnaeus, 1758)
- Crocallis helenaria Ruckdeschel, 2006
- Crocallis tusciaria (Borkhausen, 1793)
- Cyclophora linearia (Hübner, 1799)
- Cyclophora porata (Linnaeus, 1767)
- Cyclophora punctaria (Linnaeus, 1758)
- Cyclophora suppunctaria (Zeller, 1847)
- Cyclophora albiocellaria (Hübner, 1789)
- Cyclophora annularia (Fabricius, 1775)
- Cyclophora ariadne Reisser, 1939
- Cyclophora puppillaria (Hübner, 1799)
- Cyclophora quercimontaria (Bastelberger, 1897)
- Cyclophora ruficiliaria (Herrich-Schäffer, 1855)
- Dasycorsa modesta (Staudinger, 1879)
- Deileptenia ribeata (Clerck, 1759)
- Docirava dervenaria (von Mentzer, 1981)
- Docirava mundulata (Guenée, 1858)
- Dyscia conspersaria (Denis & Schiffermüller, 1775)
- Dyscia crassipunctaria (Rebel, 1916)
- Dyscia innocentaria (Christoph, 1885)
- Dyscia raunaria (Freyer, 1852)
- Dysstroma truncata (Hufnagel, 1767)
- Eilicrinia cordiaria (Hübner, 1790)
- Eilicrinia trinotata (Metzner, 1845)
- Ematurga atomaria (Linnaeus, 1758)
- Ennomos alniaria (Linnaeus, 1758)
- Ennomos duercki Reisser, 1958
- Ennomos quercaria (Hübner, 1813)
- Ennomos quercinaria (Hufnagel, 1767)
- Entephria cyanata (Hübner, 1809)
- Entephria flavicinctata (Hübner, 1813)
- Epione repandaria (Hufnagel, 1767)
- Epirrhoe alternata (Muller, 1764)
- Epirrhoe galiata (Denis & Schiffermüller, 1775)
- Epirrhoe molluginata (Hübner, 1813)
- Epirrhoe rivata (Hübner, 1813)
- Epirrita dilutata (Denis & Schiffermüller, 1775)
- Epirrita terminassianae Vardikian, 1974
- Eucrostes indigenata (de Villers, 1789)
- Eulithis peloponnesiaca (Rebel, 1902)
- Eulithis populata (Linnaeus, 1758)
- Eulithis prunata (Linnaeus, 1758)
- Eumannia oppositaria (Mann, 1864)
- Eumannia psyloritaria (Reisser, 1958)
- Eumera regina Staudinger, 1892
- Euphyia biangulata (Haworth, 1809)
- Euphyia frustata (Treitschke, 1828)
- Euphyia unangulata (Haworth, 1809)
- Eupithecia abietaria (Goeze, 1781)
- Eupithecia absinthiata (Clerck, 1759)
- Eupithecia addictata Dietze, 1908
- Eupithecia alliaria Staudinger, 1870
- Eupithecia antalica Mironov, 2001
- Eupithecia biornata Christoph, 1867
- Eupithecia breviculata (Donzel, 1837)
- Eupithecia carpophagata Staudinger, 1871
- Eupithecia centaureata (Denis & Schiffermüller, 1775)
- Eupithecia cerussaria (Lederer, 1855)
- Eupithecia cretaceata (Packard, 1874)
- Eupithecia cuculliaria (Rebel, 1901)
- Eupithecia denotata (Hübner, 1813)
- Eupithecia distinctaria Herrich-Schäffer, 1848
- Eupithecia dodoneata Guenée, 1858
- Eupithecia druentiata Dietze, 1902
- Eupithecia ericeata (Rambur, 1833)
- Eupithecia extraversaria Herrich-Schäffer, 1852
- Eupithecia extremata (Fabricius, 1787)
- Eupithecia fuscicostata Christoph, 1887
- Eupithecia gemellata Herrich-Schäffer, 1861
- Eupithecia graphata (Treitschke, 1828)
- Eupithecia gratiosata Herrich-Schäffer, 1861
- Eupithecia gueneata Milliere, 1862
- Eupithecia haworthiata Doubleday, 1856
- Eupithecia icterata (de Villers, 1789)
- Eupithecia impurata (Hübner, 1813)
- Eupithecia innotata (Hufnagel, 1767)
- Eupithecia insigniata (Hübner, 1790)
- Eupithecia intricata (Zetterstedt, 1839)
- Eupithecia irriguata (Hübner, 1813)
- Eupithecia laquaearia Herrich-Schäffer, 1848
- Eupithecia lentiscata Mabille, 1869
- Eupithecia limbata Staudinger, 1879
- Eupithecia linariata (Denis & Schiffermüller, 1775)
- Eupithecia millefoliata Rossler, 1866
- Eupithecia mystica Dietze, 1910
- Eupithecia ochridata Schutze & Pinker, 1968
- Eupithecia oxycedrata (Rambur, 1833)
- Eupithecia pauxillaria Boisduval, 1840
- Eupithecia phoeniceata (Rambur, 1834)
- Eupithecia pimpinellata (Hübner, 1813)
- Eupithecia plumbeolata (Haworth, 1809)
- Eupithecia pulchellata Stephens, 1831
- Eupithecia pusillata (Denis & Schiffermüller, 1775)
- Eupithecia pyreneata Mabille, 1871
- Eupithecia quercetica Prout, 1938
- Eupithecia reisserata Pinker, 1976
- Eupithecia riparia Herrich-Schäffer, 1851
- Eupithecia satyrata (Hübner, 1813)
- Eupithecia scalptata Christoph, 1885
- Eupithecia schiefereri Bohatsch, 1893
- Eupithecia scopariata (Rambur, 1833)
- Eupithecia semigraphata Bruand, 1850
- Eupithecia silenicolata Mabille, 1867
- Eupithecia simpliciata (Haworth, 1809)
- Eupithecia spissilineata (Metzner, 1846)
- Eupithecia subfuscata (Haworth, 1809)
- Eupithecia succenturiata (Linnaeus, 1758)
- Eupithecia tantillaria Boisduval, 1840
- Eupithecia thurnerata Schutze, 1958
- Eupithecia ultimaria Boisduval, 1840
- Eupithecia unedonata Mabille, 1868
- Eupithecia venosata (Fabricius, 1787)
- Eupithecia virgaureata Doubleday, 1861
- Fagivorina arenaria (Hufnagel, 1767)
- Gagitodes sagittata (Fabricius, 1787)
- Gandaritis pyraliata (Denis & Schiffermüller, 1775)
- Gnopharmia stevenaria (Boisduval, 1840)
- Gnophos sartata Treitschke, 1827
- Gnophos furvata (Denis & Schiffermüller, 1775)
- Gnophos obfuscata (Denis & Schiffermüller, 1775)
- Gnophos dumetata Treitschke, 1827
- Gnophos zacharia Staudinger, 1879
- Gymnoscelis rufifasciata (Haworth, 1809)
- Gypsochroa renitidata (Hübner, 1817)
- Heliomata glarearia (Denis & Schiffermüller, 1775)
- Hemistola chrysoprasaria (Esper, 1795)
- Hemithea aestivaria (Hübner, 1789)
- Horisme corticata (Treitschke, 1835)
- Horisme radicaria (de La Harpe, 1855)
- Horisme tersata (Denis & Schiffermüller, 1775)
- Horisme vitalbata (Denis & Schiffermüller, 1775)
- Hylaea fasciaria (Linnaeus, 1758)
- Hypomecis punctinalis (Scopoli, 1763)
- Hypomecis roboraria (Denis & Schiffermüller, 1775)
- Idaea albitorquata (Pungeler, 1909)
- Idaea aureolaria (Denis & Schiffermüller, 1775)
- Idaea aversata (Linnaeus, 1758)
- Idaea biselata (Hufnagel, 1767)
- Idaea camparia (Herrich-Schäffer, 1852)
- Idaea circuitaria (Hübner, 1819)
- Idaea consanguinaria (Lederer, 1853)
- Idaea consolidata (Lederer, 1853)
- Idaea degeneraria (Hübner, 1799)
- Idaea determinata (Staudinger, 1876)
- Idaea deversaria (Herrich-Schäffer, 1847)
- Idaea dilutaria (Hübner, 1799)
- Idaea dimidiata (Hufnagel, 1767)
- Idaea distinctaria (Boisduval, 1840)
- Idaea elongaria (Rambur, 1833)
- Idaea emarginata (Linnaeus, 1758)
- Idaea filicata (Hübner, 1799)
- Idaea fuscovenosa (Goeze, 1781)
- Idaea humiliata (Hufnagel, 1767)
- Idaea infirmaria (Rambur, 1833)
- Idaea inquinata (Scopoli, 1763)
- Idaea intermedia (Staudinger, 1879)
- Idaea laevigata (Scopoli, 1763)
- Idaea leipnitzi Hausmann, 2004
- Idaea longaria (Herrich-Schäffer, 1852)
- Idaea metohiensis (Rebel, 1900)
- Idaea moniliata (Denis & Schiffermüller, 1775)
- Idaea obsoletaria (Rambur, 1833)
- Idaea ochrata (Scopoli, 1763)
- Idaea ossiculata (Lederer, 1870)
- Idaea ostrinaria (Hübner, 1813)
- Idaea palaestinensis (Sterneck, 1933)
- Idaea pallidata (Denis & Schiffermüller, 1775)
- Idaea politaria (Hübner, 1799)
- Idaea rubraria (Staudinger, 1901)
- Idaea rufaria (Hübner, 1799)
- Idaea rusticata (Denis & Schiffermüller, 1775)
- Idaea seriata (Schrank, 1802)
- Idaea sericeata (Hübner, 1813)
- Idaea straminata (Borkhausen, 1794)
- Idaea subsericeata (Haworth, 1809)
- Idaea tineata (Thierry-Mieg, 1911)
- Idaea trigeminata (Haworth, 1809)
- Idaea troglodytaria (Heydenreich, 1851)
- Isturgia arenacearia (Denis & Schiffermüller, 1775)
- Isturgia berytaria (Staudinger, 1892)
- Jodis lactearia (Linnaeus, 1758)
- Larentia clavaria (Haworth, 1809)
- Larentia malvata (Rambur, 1833)
- Ligdia adustata (Denis & Schiffermüller, 1775)
- Lithostege farinata (Hufnagel, 1767)
- Lithostege palaestinensis Amsel, 1935
- Lomaspilis bithynica Wehrli, 1954
- Lycia graecarius (Staudinger, 1861)
- Lycia hirtaria (Clerck, 1759)
- Lythria purpuraria (Linnaeus, 1758)
- Macaria artesiaria (Denis & Schiffermüller, 1775)
- Macaria liturata (Clerck, 1759)
- Macaria notata (Linnaeus, 1758)
- Macaria signaria (Hübner, 1809)
- Macaria wauaria (Linnaeus, 1758)
- Mattia adlata (Staudinger, 1895)
- Melanthia procellata (Denis & Schiffermüller, 1775)
- Menophra abruptaria (Thunberg, 1792)
- Menophra berenicidaria (Turati, 1924)
- Menophra japygiaria (O. Costa, 1849)
- Microloxia herbaria (Hübner, 1813)
- Minoa murinata (Scopoli, 1763)
- Myinodes shohami Hausmann, 1994
- Nebula achromaria (de La Harpe, 1853)
- Nebula nebulata (Treitschke, 1828)
- Nebula schneideraria (Lederer, 1855)
- Nebula senectaria (Herrich-Schäffer, 1852)
- Nychiodes amygdalaria (Herrich-Schäffer, 1848)
- Nychiodes dalmatina Wagner, 1909
- Nychiodes waltheri Wagner, 1919
- Nychiodes obscuraria (de Villers, 1789)
- Nycterosea obstipata (Fabricius, 1794)
- Odezia atrata (Linnaeus, 1758)
- Odontopera graecarius (A. Bang-Haas, 1910)
- Opisthograptis luteolata (Linnaeus, 1758)
- Ortaliella gruneraria (Staudinger, 1862)
- Orthostixis cribraria (Hübner, 1799)
- Oulobophora externaria (Herrich-Schäffer, 1848)
- Oulobophora internata (Pungeler, 1888)
- Ourapteryx sambucaria (Linnaeus, 1758)
- Pachycnemia hippocastanaria (Hübner, 1799)
- Pachycnemia tibiaria (Rambur, 1829)
- Paraboarmia viertlii (Bohatsch, 1883)
- Pareulype lasithiotica (Rebel, 1906)
- Pasiphila debiliata (Hübner, 1817)
- Pasiphila rectangulata (Linnaeus, 1758)
- Pennithera ulicata (Rambur, 1934)
- Perconia strigillaria (Hübner, 1787)
- Peribatodes correptaria (Zeller, 1847)
- Peribatodes ilicaria (Geyer, 1833)
- Peribatodes rhomboidaria (Denis & Schiffermüller, 1775)
- Peribatodes secundaria (Denis & Schiffermüller, 1775)
- Peribatodes umbraria (Hübner, 1809)
- Perizoma albulata (Denis & Schiffermüller, 1775)
- Perizoma alchemillata (Linnaeus, 1758)
- Perizoma bifaciata (Haworth, 1809)
- Perizoma flavosparsata (Wagner, 1926)
- Perizoma minorata (Treitschke, 1828)
- Petrophora chlorosata (Scopoli, 1763)
- Phaiogramma etruscaria (Zeller, 1849)
- Phaiogramma faustinata (Milliere, 1868)
- Phigalia pilosaria (Denis & Schiffermüller, 1775)
- Philereme transversata (Hufnagel, 1767)
- Plagodis pulveraria (Linnaeus, 1758)
- Plemyria rubiginata (Denis & Schiffermüller, 1775)
- Problepsis ocellata (Frivaldszky, 1845)
- Proteuchloris neriaria (Herrich-Schäffer, 1852)
- Protorhoe corollaria (Herrich-Schäffer, 1848)
- Protorhoe unicata (Guenée, 1858)
- Pseudopanthera macularia (Linnaeus, 1758)
- Pseudoterpna coronillaria (Hübner, 1817)
- Pseudoterpna pruinata (Hufnagel, 1767)
- Pungeleria capreolaria (Denis & Schiffermüller, 1775)
- Rhodometra sacraria (Linnaeus, 1767)
- Rhodostrophia calabra (Petagna, 1786)
- Rhodostrophia cretacaria Rebel, 1916
- Rhodostrophia discopunctata Amsel, 1935
- Rhodostrophia tabidaria (Zeller, 1847)
- Rhodostrophia vibicaria (Clerck, 1759)
- Rhoptria asperaria (Hübner, 1817)
- Rhoptria dolosaria (Herrich-Schäffer, 1848)
- Schistostege decussata (Denis & Schiffermüller, 1775)
- Scopula asellaria (Herrich-Schäffer, 1847)
- Scopula beckeraria (Lederer, 1853)
- Scopula confinaria (Herrich-Schäffer, 1847)
- Scopula flaccidaria (Zeller, 1852)
- Scopula imitaria (Hübner, 1799)
- Scopula immutata (Linnaeus, 1758)
- Scopula incanata (Linnaeus, 1758)
- Scopula luridata (Zeller, 1847)
- Scopula marginepunctata (Goeze, 1781)
- Scopula mentzeri Hausmann, 1993
- Scopula minorata (Boisduval, 1833)
- Scopula decorata (Denis & Schiffermüller, 1775)
- Scopula nigropunctata (Hufnagel, 1767)
- Scopula ochraceata (Staudinger, 1901)
- Scopula ornata (Scopoli, 1763)
- Scopula rubiginata (Hufnagel, 1767)
- Scopula submutata (Treitschke, 1828)
- Scopula tessellaria (Boisduval, 1840)
- Scopula turbulentaria (Staudinger, 1870)
- Scopula vigilata (Sohn-Rethel, 1929)
- Scotopteryx bipunctaria (Denis & Schiffermüller, 1775)
- Scotopteryx chenopodiata (Linnaeus, 1758)
- Scotopteryx coarctaria (Denis & Schiffermüller, 1775)
- Scotopteryx ignorata Huemer & Hausmann, 1998
- Scotopteryx luridata (Hufnagel, 1767)
- Scotopteryx moeniata (Scopoli, 1763)
- Scotopteryx olympia Rezbanyai-Reser, 2003
- Scotopteryx vicinaria (Duponchel, 1830)
- Selenia lunularia (Hübner, 1788)
- Selidosema brunnearia (de Villers, 1789)
- Selidosema plumaria (Denis & Schiffermüller, 1775)
- Siona lineata (Scopoli, 1763)
- Stamnodes depeculata (Lederer, 1870)
- Stegania dilectaria (Hübner, 1790)
- Synopsia sociaria (Hübner, 1799)
- Tephronia sepiaria (Hufnagel, 1767)
- Thalera fimbrialis (Scopoli, 1763)
- Thera britannica (Turner, 1925)
- Thera cognata (Thunberg, 1792)
- Thera cupressata (Geyer, 1831)
- Thera variata (Denis & Schiffermüller, 1775)
- Thera vetustata (Denis & Schiffermüller, 1775)
- Thetidia smaragdaria (Fabricius, 1787)
- Timandra comae Schmidt, 1931
- Triphosa dubitata (Linnaeus, 1758)
- Triphosa sabaudiata (Duponchel, 1830)
- Xanthorhoe biriviata (Borkhausen, 1794)
- Xanthorhoe designata (Hufnagel, 1767)
- Xanthorhoe disjunctaria (de La Harpe, 1860)
- Xanthorhoe fluctuata (Linnaeus, 1758)
- Xanthorhoe friedrichi Viidalepp & Skou, 2004
- Xanthorhoe montanata (Denis & Schiffermüller, 1775)
- Xanthorhoe oxybiata (Milliere, 1872)
- Xanthorhoe spadicearia (Denis & Schiffermüller, 1775)
- Xenochlorodes olympiaria (Herrich-Schäffer, 1852)

=== Glyphipterigidae ===
- Acrolepiopsis vesperella (Zeller, 1850)
- Digitivalva eglanteriella (Mann, 1855)
- Digitivalva granitella (Treitschke, 1833)
- Digitivalva macedonica (Klimesch, 1956)
- Digitivalva occidentella (Klimesch, 1956)
- Digitivalva pulicariae (Klimesch, 1956)
- Digitivalva seligeri Gaedike, 2011
- Glyphipterix equitella (Scopoli, 1763)
- Glyphipterix schoenicolella Boyd, 1859
- Glyphipterix simpliciella (Stephens, 1834)
- Glyphipterix thrasonella (Scopoli, 1763)
- Orthotelia sparganella (Thunberg, 1788)

=== Gracillariidae ===
- Acrocercops brongniardella (Fabricius, 1798)
- Acrocercops tacita Triberti, 2001
- Aspilapteryx inquinata Triberti, 1985
- Aspilapteryx limosella (Duponchel, 1843)
- Aspilapteryx tringipennella (Zeller, 1839)
- Caloptilia alchimiella (Scopoli, 1763)
- Caloptilia braccatella (Staudinger, 1870)
- Caloptilia elongella (Linnaeus, 1761)
- Caloptilia flava (Staudinger, 1871)
- Caloptilia roscipennella (Hübner, 1796)
- Calybites phasianipennella (Hübner, 1813)
- Cameraria ohridella Deschka & Dimic, 1986
- Cupedia cupediella (Herrich-Schäffer, 1855)
- Dextellia dorsilineella (Amsel, 1935)
- Dialectica scalariella (Zeller, 1850)
- Dialectica soffneri (Gregor & Povolny, 1965)
- Euspilapteryx auroguttella Stephens, 1835
- Gracillaria syringella (Fabricius, 1794)
- Metriochroa latifoliella (Milliere, 1886)
- Micrurapteryx kollariella (Zeller, 1839)
- Parornix acuta Triberti, 1980
- Parornix anguliferella (Zeller, 1847)
- Parornix carpinella (Frey, 1863)
- Parornix compsumpta Triberti, 1987
- Parornix finitimella (Zeller, 1850)
- Parornix fragilella Triberti, 1981
- Parornix oculata Triberti, 1979
- Parornix scoticella (Stainton, 1850)
- Parornix torquillella (Zeller, 1850)
- Phyllocnistis citrella Stainton, 1856
- Phyllocnistis labyrinthella (Bjerkander, 1790)
- Phyllocnistis unipunctella (Stephens, 1834)
- Phyllocnistis valentinensis M. Hering, 1936
- Phyllonorycter abrasella (Duponchel, 1843)
- Phyllonorycter anceps Triberti, 2007
- Phyllonorycter belotella (Staudinger, 1859)
- Phyllonorycter blancardella (Fabricius, 1781)
- Phyllonorycter brunnea Deschka, 1975
- Phyllonorycter cephalariae (Lhomme, 1934)
- Phyllonorycter cerasicolella (Herrich-Schäffer, 1855)
- Phyllonorycter christenseni Derra, 1985
- Phyllonorycter corylifoliella (Hübner, 1796)
- Phyllonorycter cydoniella (Denis & Schiffermüller, 1775)
- Phyllonorycter delitella (Duponchel, 1843)
- Phyllonorycter esperella (Goeze, 1783)
- Phyllonorycter fraxinella (Zeller, 1846)
- Phyllonorycter gerfriedi A. & Z. Lastuvka, 2007
- Phyllonorycter graecus A. & Z. Lastuvka, 2007
- Phyllonorycter helianthemella (Herrich-Schäffer, 1861)
- Phyllonorycter ilicifoliella (Duponchel, 1843)
- Phyllonorycter kusdasi Deschka, 1970
- Phyllonorycter lapadiella (Krone, 1909)
- Phyllonorycter lautella (Zeller, 1846)
- Phyllonorycter leucographella (Zeller, 1850)
- Phyllonorycter macedonica (Deschka, 1971)
- Phyllonorycter maestingella (Muller, 1764)
- Phyllonorycter messaniella (Zeller, 1846)
- Phyllonorycter millierella (Staudinger, 1871)
- Phyllonorycter muelleriella (Zeller, 1839)
- Phyllonorycter obtusifoliella Deschka, 1974
- Phyllonorycter olympica Deschka, 1983
- Phyllonorycter parisiella (Wocke, 1848)
- Phyllonorycter platani (Staudinger, 1870)
- Phyllonorycter populifoliella (Treitschke, 1833)
- Phyllonorycter quercifoliella (Zeller, 1839)
- Phyllonorycter roboris (Zeller, 1839)
- Phyllonorycter scitulella (Duponchel, 1843)
- Phyllonorycter spinicolella (Zeller, 1846)
- Phyllonorycter suberifoliella (Zeller, 1850)
- Phyllonorycter sublautella (Stainton, 1869)
- Phyllonorycter trifasciella (Haworth, 1828)
- Phyllonorycter triflorella (Peyerimhoff, 1872)
- Phyllonorycter trojana Deschka, 1982
- Phyllonorycter ulicicolella (Stainton, 1851)
- Povolnya leucapennella (Stephens, 1835)
- Spulerina simploniella (Fischer von Röslerstamm, 1840)

=== Heliozelidae ===
- Antispila treitschkiella (Fischer von Röslerstamm, 1843)
- Holocacista rivillei (Stainton, 1855)

=== Hepialidae ===
- Pharmacis lupulina (Linnaeus, 1758)
- Triodia adriaticus (Osthelder, 1931)
- Triodia amasinus (Herrich-Schäffer, 1851)
- Triodia sylvina (Linnaeus, 1761)

=== Heterogynidae ===
- Heterogynis penella (Hübner, 1819)

=== Incurvariidae ===
- Incurvaria masculella (Denis & Schiffermüller, 1775)
- Incurvaria oehlmanniella (Hübner, 1796)

=== Lasiocampidae ===
- Dendrolimus pini (Linnaeus, 1758)
- Eriogaster catax (Linnaeus, 1758)
- Eriogaster lanestris (Linnaeus, 1758)
- Eriogaster rimicola (Denis & Schiffermüller, 1775)
- Euthrix potatoria (Linnaeus, 1758)
- Gastropacha quercifolia (Linnaeus, 1758)
- Lasiocampa quercus (Linnaeus, 1758)
- Lasiocampa grandis (Rogenhofer, 1891)
- Lasiocampa trifolii (Denis & Schiffermüller, 1775)
- Macrothylacia rubi (Linnaeus, 1758)
- Malacosoma castrensis (Linnaeus, 1758)
- Malacosoma neustria (Linnaeus, 1758)
- Malacosoma franconica (Denis & Schiffermüller, 1775)
- Odonestis pruni (Linnaeus, 1758)
- Pachypasa otus (Drury, 1773)
- Phyllodesma ilicifolia (Linnaeus, 1758)
- Phyllodesma tremulifolia (Hübner, 1810)
- Trichiura castiliana Spuler, 1908
- Trichiura crataegi (Linnaeus, 1758)
- Trichiura verenae Witt, 1981

=== Lecithoceridae ===
- Ceuthomadarus viduellus Rebel, 1903
- Eurodachtha flavissimella (Mann, 1862)
- Lecithocera nigrana (Duponchel, 1836)
- Odites kollarella (O. G. Costa, 1832)

=== Limacodidae ===
- Apoda limacodes (Hufnagel, 1766)
- Heterogenea asella (Denis & Schiffermüller, 1775)
- Hoyosia cretica (Rebel, 1906)

=== Lyonetiidae ===
- Leucoptera malifoliella (O. Costa, 1836)
- Leucoptera nieukerkeni Mey, 1994
- Leucoptera thessalica Mey, 1994
- Lyonetia clerkella (Linnaeus, 1758)
- Lyonetia prunifoliella (Hübner, 1796)

=== Micropterigidae ===
- Micropterix aruncella (Scopoli, 1763)
- Micropterix corcyrella Walsingham, 1919
- Micropterix kardamylensis Rebel, 1903
- Micropterix klimeschi Heath, 1973
- Micropterix lakoniensis Heath, 1985
- Micropterix myrtetella Zeller, 1850
- Micropterix tunbergella (Fabricius, 1787)
- Micropterix wockei Staudinger, 1870

=== Millieridae ===
- Millieria dolosalis (Heydenreich, 1851)

=== Momphidae ===
- Mompha miscella (Denis & Schiffermüller, 1775)
- Mompha conturbatella (Hübner, 1819)
- Mompha epilobiella (Denis & Schiffermüller, 1775)
- Mompha meridionella Koster & Sinev, 2003
- Mompha ochraceella (Curtis, 1839)
- Mompha subbistrigella (Haworth, 1828)
- Mompha raschkiella (Zeller, 1839)

=== Nepticulidae ===
- Acalyptris lesbia van Nieukerken & Hull, 2007
- Acalyptris limonii Z. & A. Lastuvka, 1998
- Acalyptris loranthella (Klimesch, 1937)
- Acalyptris maritima A. & Z. Lastuvka, 1997
- Acalyptris pistaciae van Nieukerken, 2007
- Acalyptris platani (Muller-Rutz, 1934)
- Ectoedemia aegilopidella (Klimesch, 1978)
- Ectoedemia agrimoniae (Frey, 1858)
- Ectoedemia albifasciella (Heinemann, 1871)
- Ectoedemia alnifoliae van Nieukerken, 1985
- Ectoedemia angulifasciella (Stainton, 1849)
- Ectoedemia arcuatella (Herrich-Schäffer, 1855)
- Ectoedemia argyropeza (Zeller, 1839)
- Ectoedemia caradjai (Groschke, 1944)
- Ectoedemia cerris (Zimmermann, 1944)
- Ectoedemia contorta van Nieukerken, 1985
- Ectoedemia erythrogenella (de Joannis, 1908)
- Ectoedemia gilvipennella (Klimesch, 1946)
- Ectoedemia haraldi (Soffner, 1942)
- Ectoedemia heringella (Mariani, 1939)
- Ectoedemia heringi (Toll, 1934)
- Ectoedemia klimeschi (Skala, 1933)
- Ectoedemia mahalebella (Klimesch, 1936)
- Ectoedemia preisseckeri (Klimesch, 1941)
- Ectoedemia pseudoilicis Z. & A. Lastuvka, 1998
- Ectoedemia quinquella (Bedell, 1848)
- Ectoedemia rufifrontella (Caradja, 1920)
- Ectoedemia spinosella (de Joannis, 1908)
- Ectoedemia subbimaculella (Haworth, 1828)
- Ectoedemia terebinthivora (Klimesch, 1975)
- Ectoedemia decentella (Herrich-Schäffer, 1855)
- Ectoedemia aegaeica Z. & A. Lastuvka & Johansson, 1998
- Ectoedemia deschkai (Klimesch, 1978)
- Ectoedemia empetrifolii A. & Z. Lastuvka, 2000
- Ectoedemia eriki A. & Z. Lastuvka, 2000
- Ectoedemia euphorbiella (Stainton, 1869)
- Ectoedemia groschkei (Skala, 1943)
- Ectoedemia septembrella (Stainton, 1849)
- Ectoedemia amani Svensson, 1966
- Ectoedemia atrifrontella (Stainton, 1851)
- Ectoedemia liebwerdella Zimmermann, 1940
- Ectoedemia longicaudella Klimesch, 1953
- Ectoedemia monemvasiae van Nieukerken, 1985
- Ectoedemia reichli Z. & A. Lastuvka, 1998
- Parafomoria pseudocistivora van Nieukerken, 1983
- Simplimorpha promissa (Staudinger, 1871)
- Stigmella aceris (Frey, 1857)
- Stigmella amygdali (Klimesch, 1978)
- Stigmella atricapitella (Haworth, 1828)
- Stigmella aurella (Fabricius, 1775)
- Stigmella auromarginella (Richardson, 1890)
- Stigmella azaroli (Klimesch, 1978)
- Stigmella basiguttella (Heinemann, 1862)
- Stigmella cocciferae van Nieukerken & Johansson, 2003
- Stigmella dorsiguttella (Johansson, 1971)
- Stigmella eberhardi (Johansson, 1971)
- Stigmella fasciata van Nieukerken & Johansson, 2003
- Stigmella filipendulae (Wocke, 1871)
- Stigmella freyella (Heyden, 1858)
- Stigmella hemargyrella (Kollar, 1832)
- Stigmella hybnerella (Hübner, 1796)
- Stigmella incognitella (Herrich-Schäffer, 1855)
- Stigmella irregularis Puplesis, 1994
- Stigmella johanssonella A. & Z. Lastuvka, 1997
- Stigmella lemniscella (Zeller, 1839)
- Stigmella macrolepidella (Klimesch, 1978)
- Stigmella malella (Stainton, 1854)
- Stigmella microtheriella (Stainton, 1854)
- Stigmella minusculella (Herrich-Schäffer, 1855)
- Stigmella muricatella (Klimesch, 1978)
- Stigmella nivenburgensis (Preissecker, 1942)
- Stigmella paliurella Gerasimov, 1937
- Stigmella paradoxa (Frey, 1858)
- Stigmella perpygmaeella (Doubleday, 1859)
- Stigmella plagicolella (Stainton, 1854)
- Stigmella prunetorum (Stainton, 1855)
- Stigmella pyrellicola (Klimesch, 1978)
- Stigmella rhamnophila (Amsel, 1934)
- Stigmella roborella (Johansson, 1971)
- Stigmella rolandi van Nieukerken, 1990
- Stigmella ruficapitella (Haworth, 1828)
- Stigmella samiatella (Zeller, 1839)
- Stigmella sorbi (Stainton, 1861)
- Stigmella speciosa (Frey, 1858)
- Stigmella styracicolella (Klimesch, 1978)
- Stigmella svenssoni (Johansson, 1971)
- Stigmella szoecsiella (Borkowski, 1972)
- Stigmella tityrella (Stainton, 1854)
- Stigmella trimaculella (Haworth, 1828)
- Stigmella trojana Z. & A. Lastuvka, 1998
- Stigmella ulmiphaga (Preissecker, 1942)
- Stigmella viscerella (Stainton, 1853)
- Stigmella zangherii (Klimesch, 1951)
- Trifurcula albiflorella Klimesch, 1978
- Trifurcula bleonella (Chrétien, 1904)
- Trifurcula headleyella (Stainton, 1854)
- Trifurcula helladica Z. & A. Lastuvka, 2007
- Trifurcula kalavritana Z. & A. Lastuvka, 1998
- Trifurcula melanoptera van Nieukerken & Puplesis, 1991
- Trifurcula saturejae (Parenti, 1963)
- Trifurcula trilobella Klimesch, 1978
- Trifurcula cryptella (Stainton, 1856)
- Trifurcula eurema (Tutt, 1899)
- Trifurcula manygoza van Nieukerken, A. & Z. Lastuvka, 2007
- Trifurcula peloponnesica van Nieukerken, 2007
- Trifurcula aurella Rebel, 1933
- Trifurcula austriaca van Nieukerken, 1990
- Trifurcula calycotomella A. & Z. Lastuvka, 1997
- Trifurcula graeca Z. & A. Lastuvka, 1998
- Trifurcula josefklimeschi van Nieukerken, 1990
- Trifurcula orientella Klimesch, 1953
- Trifurcula pallidella (Duponchel, 1843)
- Trifurcula subnitidella (Duponchel, 1843)

=== Noctuidae ===
- Abrostola agnorista Dufay, 1956
- Abrostola asclepiadis (Denis & Schiffermüller, 1775)
- Abrostola tripartita (Hufnagel, 1766)
- Abrostola triplasia (Linnaeus, 1758)
- Acontia lucida (Hufnagel, 1766)
- Acontia trabealis (Scopoli, 1763)
- Acontia melanura (Tauscher, 1809)
- Acontiola lascivalis (Lederer, 1855)
- Acontiola moldavicola (Herrich-Schäffer, 1851)
- Acronicta aceris (Linnaeus, 1758)
- Acronicta strigosa (Denis & Schiffermüller, 1775)
- Acronicta cuspis (Hübner, 1813)
- Acronicta psi (Linnaeus, 1758)
- Acronicta tridens (Denis & Schiffermüller, 1775)
- Acronicta auricoma (Denis & Schiffermüller, 1775)
- Acronicta euphorbiae (Denis & Schiffermüller, 1775)
- Acronicta orientalis (Mann, 1862)
- Acronicta rumicis (Linnaeus, 1758)
- Actebia fugax (Treitschke, 1825)
- Actinotia polyodon (Clerck, 1759)
- Actinotia radiosa (Esper, 1804)
- Aedia funesta (Esper, 1786)
- Aedia leucomelas (Linnaeus, 1758)
- Aegle agatha (Staudinger, 1861)
- Aegle kaekeritziana (Hübner, 1799)
- Aegle pallida (Staudinger, 1892)
- Aegle semicana (Esper, 1798)
- Agrochola lychnidis (Denis & Schiffermüller, 1775)
- Agrochola lactiflora Draudt, 1934
- Agrochola deleta (Staudinger, 1882)
- Agrochola gratiosa (Staudinger, 1882)
- Agrochola helvola (Linnaeus, 1758)
- Agrochola humilis (Denis & Schiffermüller, 1775)
- Agrochola kindermannii (Fischer v. Röslerstamm, 1837)
- Agrochola litura (Linnaeus, 1758)
- Agrochola luteogrisea (Warren, 1911)
- Agrochola nitida (Denis & Schiffermüller, 1775)
- Agrochola osthelderi Boursin, 1951
- Agrochola rupicapra (Staudinger, 1879)
- Agrochola thurneri Boursin, 1953
- Agrochola mansueta (Herrich-Schäffer, 1850)
- Agrochola lota (Clerck, 1759)
- Agrochola macilenta (Hübner, 1809)
- Agrochola schreieri Hacker & Weigert, 1986
- Agrochola laevis (Hübner, 1803)
- Agrochola circellaris (Hufnagel, 1766)
- Agrotis bigramma (Esper, 1790)
- Agrotis catalaunensis (Milliere, 1873)
- Agrotis cinerea (Denis & Schiffermüller, 1775)
- Agrotis clavis (Hufnagel, 1766)
- Agrotis endogaea Boisduval, 1834
- Agrotis exclamationis (Linnaeus, 1758)
- Agrotis haifae Staudinger, 1897
- Agrotis herzogi Rebel, 1911
- Agrotis ipsilon (Hufnagel, 1766)
- Agrotis puta (Hübner, 1803)
- Agrotis segetum (Denis & Schiffermüller, 1775)
- Agrotis spinifera (Hübner, 1808)
- Agrotis trux (Hübner, 1824)
- Agrotis vestigialis (Hufnagel, 1766)
- Allophyes asiatica (Staudinger, 1892)
- Allophyes cretica Pinker & Reisser, 1978
- Allophyes oxyacanthae (Linnaeus, 1758)
- Amephana dalmatica (Rebel, 1919)
- Ammoconia caecimacula (Denis & Schiffermüller, 1775)
- Ammoconia reisseri L. Ronkay & Varga, 1984
- Ammoconia senex (Geyer, 1828)
- Amphipoea fucosa (Freyer, 1830)
- Amphipoea oculea (Linnaeus, 1761)
- Amphipyra berbera Rungs, 1949
- Amphipyra effusa Boisduval, 1828
- Amphipyra livida (Denis & Schiffermüller, 1775)
- Amphipyra micans Lederer, 1857
- Amphipyra pyramidea (Linnaeus, 1758)
- Amphipyra stix Herrich-Schäffer, 1850
- Amphipyra tetra (Fabricius, 1787)
- Amphipyra tragopoginis (Clerck, 1759)
- Amphipyra cinnamomea (Goeze, 1781)
- Anaplectoides prasina (Denis & Schiffermüller, 1775)
- Anarta mendax (Staudinger, 1879)
- Anarta odontites (Boisduval, 1829)
- Anarta stigmosa (Christoph, 1887)
- Anarta trifolii (Hufnagel, 1766)
- Anthracia eriopoda (Herrich-Schäffer, 1851)
- Antitype chi (Linnaeus, 1758)
- Antitype jonis (Lederer, 1865)
- Antitype suda (Geyer, 1832)
- Apamea anceps (Denis & Schiffermüller, 1775)
- Apamea aquila Donzel, 1837
- Apamea baischi Hacker, 1989
- Apamea crenata (Hufnagel, 1766)
- Apamea epomidion (Haworth, 1809)
- Apamea furva (Denis & Schiffermüller, 1775)
- Apamea illyria Freyer, 1846
- Apamea lateritia (Hufnagel, 1766)
- Apamea lithoxylaea (Denis & Schiffermüller, 1775)
- Apamea maillardi (Geyer, 1834)
- Apamea michielii Varga, 1976
- Apamea minoica (Fibiger, Ronkay, Schmidt & Zilli, 2005)
- Apamea monoglypha (Hufnagel, 1766)
- Apamea platinea (Treitschke, 1825)
- Apamea remissa (Hübner, 1809)
- Apamea sicula (Turati, 1909)
- Apamea sordens (Hufnagel, 1766)
- Apamea syriaca (Osthelder, 1933)
- Apamea unanimis (Hübner, 1813)
- Apamea zeta (Treitschke, 1825)
- Apaustis rupicola (Denis & Schiffermüller, 1775)
- Aporophyla australis (Boisduval, 1829)
- Aporophyla canescens (Duponchel, 1826)
- Aporophyla chioleuca (Herrich-Schäffer, 1850)
- Aporophyla lutulenta (Denis & Schiffermüller, 1775)
- Aporophyla nigra (Haworth, 1809)
- Apterogenum ypsillon (Denis & Schiffermüller, 1775)
- Archanara dissoluta (Treitschke, 1825)
- Asteroscopus sphinx (Hufnagel, 1766)
- Asteroscopus syriaca (Warren, 1910)
- Atethmia ambusta (Denis & Schiffermüller, 1775)
- Atethmia centrago (Haworth, 1809)
- Athetis hospes (Freyer, 1831)
- Atypha pulmonaris (Esper, 1790)
- Auchmis detersa (Esper, 1787)
- Autographa gamma (Linnaeus, 1758)
- Autographa jota (Linnaeus, 1758)
- Axylia putris (Linnaeus, 1761)
- Behounekia freyeri (Frivaldszky, 1835)
- Brachylomia viminalis (Fabricius, 1776)
- Brithys crini (Fabricius, 1775)
- Bryophila ereptricula Treitschke, 1825
- Bryophila gea (Schawerda, 1934)
- Bryophila raptricula (Denis & Schiffermüller, 1775)
- Bryophila rectilinea (Warren, 1909)
- Bryophila seladona Christoph, 1885
- Bryophila tephrocharis (Boursin, 1953)
- Bryophila domestica (Hufnagel, 1766)
- Bryophila strobinoi (Dujardin, 1972)
- Bryophila petrea Guenée, 1852
- Bryophila maeonis Lederer, 1865
- Calamia tridens (Hufnagel, 1766)
- Calliergis ramosa (Esper, 1786)
- Callopistria juventina (Stoll, 1782)
- Callopistria latreillei (Duponchel, 1827)
- Calophasia barthae Wagner, 1929
- Calophasia lunula (Hufnagel, 1766)
- Calophasia opalina (Esper, 1793)
- Calophasia platyptera (Esper, 1788)
- Caradrina syriaca Staudinger, 1892
- Caradrina agrotina Staudinger, 1892
- Caradrina morpheus (Hufnagel, 1766)
- Caradrina draudti (Boursin, 1936)
- Caradrina flava Oberthur, 1876
- Caradrina gilva (Donzel, 1837)
- Caradrina pertinax Staudinger, 1879
- Caradrina zernyi (Boursin, 1939)
- Caradrina clavipalpis Scopoli, 1763
- Caradrina flavirena Guenée, 1852
- Caradrina levantina Hacker, 2004
- Caradrina minoica Hacker, 2004
- Caradrina selini Boisduval, 1840
- Caradrina suscianja (Mentzer, 1981)
- Caradrina wullschlegeli Pungeler, 1903
- Caradrina aspersa Rambur, 1834
- Caradrina kadenii Freyer, 1836
- Caradrina montana Bremer, 1861
- Cardepia hartigi Parenzan, 1981
- Cardepia sociabilis (de Graslin, 1850)
- Ceramica pisi (Linnaeus, 1758)
- Cerapteryx graminis (Linnaeus, 1758)
- Cerastis rubricosa (Denis & Schiffermüller, 1775)
- Charanyca trigrammica (Hufnagel, 1766)
- Charanyca apfelbecki (Rebel, 1901)
- Charanyca ferruginea (Esper, 1785)
- Chersotis anatolica (Draudt, 1936)
- Chersotis andereggii (Boisduval, 1832)
- Chersotis capnistis (Lederer, 1872)
- Chersotis cuprea (Denis & Schiffermüller, 1775)
- Chersotis elegans (Eversmann, 1837)
- Chersotis fimbriola (Esper, 1803)
- Chersotis laeta (Rebel, 1904)
- Chersotis larixia (Guenée, 1852)
- Chersotis margaritacea (Villers, 1789)
- Chersotis multangula (Hübner, 1803)
- Chersotis obnubila (Corti, 1926)
- Chersotis rectangula (Denis & Schiffermüller, 1775)
- Chersotis zukowskyi (Draudt, 1936)
- Chilodes maritima (Tauscher, 1806)
- Chloantha hyperici (Denis & Schiffermüller, 1775)
- Chrysodeixis chalcites (Esper, 1789)
- Cleoceris scoriacea (Esper, 1789)
- Cleonymia opposita (Lederer, 1870)
- Colocasia coryli (Linnaeus, 1758)
- Condica viscosa (Freyer, 1831)
- Conisania renati (Oberthur, 1890)
- Conisania luteago (Denis & Schiffermüller, 1775)
- Conistra ligula (Esper, 1791)
- Conistra rubiginosa (Scopoli, 1763)
- Conistra vaccinii (Linnaeus, 1761)
- Conistra veronicae (Hübner, 1813)
- Conistra erythrocephala (Denis & Schiffermüller, 1775)
- Conistra rubiginea (Denis & Schiffermüller, 1775)
- Conistra ragusae (Failla-Tedaldi, 1890)
- Conistra torrida (Lederer, 1857)
- Cornutiplusia circumflexa (Linnaeus, 1767)
- Cosmia trapezina (Linnaeus, 1758)
- Cosmia diffinis (Linnaeus, 1767)
- Cosmia pyralina (Denis & Schiffermüller, 1775)
- Cosmia confinis Herrich-Schäffer, 1849
- Cosmia affinis (Linnaeus, 1767)
- Craniophora ligustri (Denis & Schiffermüller, 1775)
- Cryphia amygdalina Boursin, 1963
- Cryphia omalosi Svendsen & Fibiger, 1998
- Cryphia receptricula (Hübner, 1803)
- Cryphia algae (Fabricius, 1775)
- Cryphia electra Fibiger, Steiner, & Ronkay, 2009
- Cryphia ochsi (Boursin, 1940)
- Ctenoplusia accentifera (Lefebvre, 1827)
- Cucullia celsiae Herrich-Schäffer, 1850
- Cucullia calendulae Treitschke, 1835
- Cucullia chamomillae (Denis & Schiffermüller, 1775)
- Cucullia formosa Rogenhofer, 1860
- Cucullia lactucae (Denis & Schiffermüller, 1775)
- Cucullia santolinae Rambur, 1834
- Cucullia santonici (Hübner, 1813)
- Cucullia syrtana Mabille, 1888
- Cucullia umbratica (Linnaeus, 1758)
- Cucullia blattariae (Esper, 1790)
- Cucullia lanceolata (Villers, 1789)
- Cucullia lychnitis Rambur, 1833
- Cucullia scrophulariae (Denis & Schiffermüller, 1775)
- Cucullia verbasci (Linnaeus, 1758)
- Dasypolia esseri Fibiger, 1993
- Dasypolia templi (Thunberg, 1792)
- Deltote bankiana (Fabricius, 1775)
- Deltote pygarga (Hufnagel, 1766)
- Denticucullus pygmina (Haworth, 1809)
- Diachrysia chrysitis (Linnaeus, 1758)
- Diachrysia chryson (Esper, 1789)
- Diachrysia nadeja (Oberthur, 1880)
- Diarsia mendica (Fabricius, 1775)
- Dichagyris flammatra (Denis & Schiffermüller, 1775)
- Dichagyris musiva (Hübner, 1803)
- Dichagyris candelisequa (Denis & Schiffermüller, 1775)
- Dichagyris celsicola (Bellier, 1859)
- Dichagyris erubescens (Staudinger, 1892)
- Dichagyris flavina (Herrich-Schäffer, 1852)
- Dichagyris forcipula (Denis & Schiffermüller, 1775)
- Dichagyris forficula (Eversmann, 1851)
- Dichagyris gracilis (Wagner, 1929)
- Dichagyris insula (Fibiger, 1997)
- Dichagyris melanura (Kollar, 1846)
- Dichagyris nigrescens (Hofner, 1888)
- Dichagyris renigera (Hübner, 1808)
- Dichagyris rhadamanthys (Reisser, 1958)
- Dichagyris signifera (Denis & Schiffermüller, 1775)
- Dichagyris soror (Fibiger, 1997)
- Dichonia aeruginea (Hübner, 1808)
- Dichonia convergens (Denis & Schiffermüller, 1775)
- Dicycla oo (Linnaeus, 1758)
- Diloba caeruleocephala (Linnaeus, 1758)
- Dioszeghyana schmidti (Dioszeghy, 1935)
- Divaena haywardi (Tams, 1926)
- Dryobota labecula (Esper, 1788)
- Dryobotodes tenebrosa (Esper, 1789)
- Dryobotodes carbonis Wagner, 1931
- Dryobotodes eremita (Fabricius, 1775)
- Dryobotodes monochroma (Esper, 1790)
- Dryobotodes servadeii Parenzan, 1982
- Dypterygia scabriuscula (Linnaeus, 1758)
- Egira anatolica (M. Hering, 1933)
- Egira conspicillaris (Linnaeus, 1758)
- Egira tibori Hreblay, 1994
- Elaphria venustula (Hübner, 1790)
- Enterpia laudeti (Boisduval, 1840)
- Epilecta linogrisea (Denis & Schiffermüller, 1775)
- Epimecia ustula (Freyer, 1835)
- Epipsilia cervantes (Reisser, 1935)
- Epipsilia grisescens (Fabricius, 1794)
- Episema glaucina (Esper, 1789)
- Episema gozmanyi L. Ronkay & Hacker, 1985
- Episema korsakovi (Christoph, 1885)
- Episema tersa (Denis & Schiffermüller, 1775)
- Eremobia ochroleuca (Denis & Schiffermüller, 1775)
- Eremohadena chenopodiphaga (Rambur, 1832)
- Eucarta amethystina (Hübner, 1803)
- Euchalcia chlorocharis (Dufay, 1961)
- Euchalcia emichi (Rogenhofer & Mann, 1873)
- Euchalcia siderifera (Eversmann, 1846)
- Eugnorisma depuncta (Linnaeus, 1761)
- Eugnorisma pontica (Staudinger, 1892)
- Euplexia lucipara (Linnaeus, 1758)
- Eupsilia transversa (Hufnagel, 1766)
- Euxoa penelope Fibiger, 1997
- Euxoa aquilina (Denis & Schiffermüller, 1775)
- Euxoa conspicua (Hübner, 1824)
- Euxoa cos (Hübner, 1824)
- Euxoa decora (Denis & Schiffermüller, 1775)
- Euxoa distinguenda (Lederer, 1857)
- Euxoa eruta (Hübner, 1817)
- Euxoa glabella Wagner, 1930
- Euxoa hastifera (Donzel, 1847)
- Euxoa malickyi Varga, 1990
- Euxoa montivaga Fibiger, 1997
- Euxoa nigricans (Linnaeus, 1761)
- Euxoa obelisca (Denis & Schiffermüller, 1775)
- Euxoa pareruta Fibiger, Gyulai, Zilli, Yela & Ronkay, 2010
- Euxoa segnilis (Duponchel, 1837)
- Euxoa temera (Hübner, 1808)
- Euxoa vitta (Esper, 1789)
- Euxoa derrae Hacker, 1985
- Evisa schawerdae Reisser, 1930
- Globia sparganii (Esper, 1790)
- Gortyna flavago (Denis & Schiffermüller, 1775)
- Gortyna moesiaca Herrich-Schäffer, 1849
- Gortyna xanthenes Germar, 1842
- Griposia aprilina (Linnaeus, 1758)
- Griposia pinkeri Kobes, 1973
- Griposia wegneri Kobes & Fibiger, 2003
- Hada plebeja (Linnaeus, 1761)
- Hadena perplexa (Denis & Schiffermüller, 1775)
- Hadena silenes (Hübner, 1822)
- Hadena syriaca (Osthelder, 1933)
- Hadena adriana (Schawerda, 1921)
- Hadena albimacula (Borkhausen, 1792)
- Hadena caesia (Denis & Schiffermüller, 1775)
- Hadena capsincola (Denis & Schiffermüller, 1775)
- Hadena clara (Staudinger, 1901)
- Hadena compta (Denis & Schiffermüller, 1775)
- Hadena confusa (Hufnagel, 1766)
- Hadena drenowskii (Rebel, 1930)
- Hadena filograna (Esper, 1788)
- Hadena gueneei (Staudinger, 1901)
- Hadena luteocincta (Rambur, 1834)
- Hadena magnolii (Boisduval, 1829)
- Hadena persimilis Hacker, 1996
- Hadena vulcanica (Turati, 1907)
- Hadena wehrlii (Draudt, 1934)
- Hadena pumila (Staudinger, 1879)
- Hadena tephroleuca (Boisduval, 1833)
- Haemerosia renalis (Hübner, 1813)
- Haemerosia vassilininei A. Bang-Haas, 1912
- Hecatera bicolorata (Hufnagel, 1766)
- Hecatera cappa (Hübner, 1809)
- Hecatera dysodea (Denis & Schiffermüller, 1775)
- Helicoverpa armigera (Hübner, 1808)
- Heliothis adaucta Butler, 1878
- Heliothis incarnata Freyer, 1838
- Heliothis maritima Graslin, 1855
- Heliothis nubigera Herrich-Schäffer, 1851
- Heliothis peltigera (Denis & Schiffermüller, 1775)
- Heliothis viriplaca (Hufnagel, 1766)
- Helivictoria victorina (Sodoffsky, 1849)
- Helotropha leucostigma (Hübner, 1808)
- Heterophysa dumetorum (Geyer, 1834)
- Hoplodrina ambigua (Denis & Schiffermüller, 1775)
- Hoplodrina blanda (Denis & Schiffermüller, 1775)
- Hoplodrina octogenaria (Goeze, 1781)
- Hoplodrina respersa (Denis & Schiffermüller, 1775)
- Hoplodrina superstes (Ochsenheimer, 1816)
- Janthinea friwaldskii (Duponchel, 1835)
- Jodia croceago (Denis & Schiffermüller, 1775)
- Lacanobia contigua (Denis & Schiffermüller, 1775)
- Lacanobia suasa (Denis & Schiffermüller, 1775)
- Lacanobia blenna (Hübner, 1824)
- Lacanobia oleracea (Linnaeus, 1758)
- Lacanobia splendens (Hübner, 1808)
- Lacanobia w-latinum (Hufnagel, 1766)
- Lamprosticta culta (Denis & Schiffermüller, 1775)
- Lasionycta proxima (Hübner, 1809)
- Lenisa geminipuncta (Haworth, 1809)
- Leucania loreyi (Duponchel, 1827)
- Leucania comma (Linnaeus, 1761)
- Leucania herrichi Herrich-Schäffer, 1849
- Leucania obsoleta (Hübner, 1803)
- Leucania palaestinae Staudinger, 1897
- Leucania punctosa (Treitschke, 1825)
- Leucania putrescens (Hübner, 1824)
- Leucania zeae (Duponchel, 1827)
- Leucochlaena muscosa (Staudinger, 1892)
- Lithophane ledereri (Staudinger, 1892)
- Lithophane merckii (Rambur, 1832)
- Lithophane ornitopus (Hufnagel, 1766)
- Lithophane semibrunnea (Haworth, 1809)
- Lithophane socia (Hufnagel, 1766)
- Lithophane lapidea (Hübner, 1808)
- Litoligia literosa (Haworth, 1809)
- Lophoterges hoerhammeri (Wagner, 1931)
- Luperina dumerilii (Duponchel, 1826)
- Luperina rubella (Duponchel, 1835)
- Lycophotia porphyrea (Denis & Schiffermüller, 1775)
- Macdunnoughia confusa (Stephens, 1850)
- Mamestra brassicae (Linnaeus, 1758)
- Maraschia grisescens Osthelder, 1933
- Megalodes eximia (Freyer, 1845)
- Meganephria bimaculosa (Linnaeus, 1767)
- Mesapamea secalella Remm, 1983
- Mesapamea secalis (Linnaeus, 1758)
- Mesogona acetosellae (Denis & Schiffermüller, 1775)
- Mesogona oxalina (Hübner, 1803)
- Mesoligia furuncula (Denis & Schiffermüller, 1775)
- Mniotype adusta (Esper, 1790)
- Mniotype satura (Denis & Schiffermüller, 1775)
- Mniotype solieri (Boisduval, 1829)
- Mormo maura (Linnaeus, 1758)
- Mythimna riparia (Rambur, 1829)
- Mythimna albipuncta (Denis & Schiffermüller, 1775)
- Mythimna congrua (Hübner, 1817)
- Mythimna ferrago (Fabricius, 1787)
- Mythimna l-album (Linnaeus, 1767)
- Mythimna umbrigera (Saalmuller, 1891)
- Mythimna languida (Walker, 1858)
- Mythimna conigera (Denis & Schiffermüller, 1775)
- Mythimna impura (Hübner, 1808)
- Mythimna pallens (Linnaeus, 1758)
- Mythimna straminea (Treitschke, 1825)
- Mythimna turca (Linnaeus, 1761)
- Mythimna vitellina (Hübner, 1808)
- Mythimna prominens (Walker, 1856)
- Mythimna unipuncta (Haworth, 1809)
- Mythimna alopecuri (Boisduval, 1840)
- Mythimna andereggii (Boisduval, 1840)
- Mythimna sicula (Treitschke, 1835)
- Naenia typica (Linnaeus, 1758)
- Noctua comes Hübner, 1813
- Noctua fimbriata (Schreber, 1759)
- Noctua interjecta Hübner, 1803
- Noctua interposita (Hübner, 1790)
- Noctua janthina Denis & Schiffermüller, 1775
- Noctua orbona (Hufnagel, 1766)
- Noctua pronuba (Linnaeus, 1758)
- Noctua tertia Mentzer & al., 1991
- Noctua tirrenica Biebinger, Speidel & Hanigk, 1983
- Nonagria typhae (Thunberg, 1784)
- Nyctobrya amasina Draudt, 1931
- Ochropleura leucogaster (Freyer, 1831)
- Ochropleura plecta (Linnaeus, 1761)
- Oligia latruncula (Denis & Schiffermüller, 1775)
- Oligia strigilis (Linnaeus, 1758)
- Olivenebula subsericata (Herrich-Schäffer, 1861)
- Omphalophana anatolica (Lederer, 1857)
- Omphalophana antirrhinii (Hübner, 1803)
- Opigena polygona (Denis & Schiffermüller, 1775)
- Oria musculosa (Hübner, 1808)
- Orthosia cerasi (Fabricius, 1775)
- Orthosia cruda (Denis & Schiffermüller, 1775)
- Orthosia dalmatica (Wagner, 1909)
- Orthosia miniosa (Denis & Schiffermüller, 1775)
- Orthosia incerta (Hufnagel, 1766)
- Orthosia gothica (Linnaeus, 1758)
- Oxytripia orbiculosa (Esper, 1799)
- Pachetra sagittigera (Hufnagel, 1766)
- Pamparama acuta (Freyer, 1838)
- Panchrysia v-argenteum (Esper, 1798)
- Panemeria tenebrata (Scopoli, 1763)
- Panemeria tenebromorpha Rakosy, Hentscholek & Huber, 1996
- Panolis flammea (Denis & Schiffermüller, 1775)
- Panthea coenobita (Esper, 1785)
- Paranataelia whitei (Rebel, 1906)
- Peridroma saucia (Hübner, 1808)
- Perigrapha i-cinctum (Denis & Schiffermüller, 1775)
- Perigrapha rorida Frivaldszky, 1835
- Perigrapha sellingi Fibiger, Hacker & Moberg, 1996
- Periphanes delphinii (Linnaeus, 1758)
- Philareta treitschkei (Frivaldszky, 1835)
- Phlogophora meticulosa (Linnaeus, 1758)
- Phlogophora scita (Hübner, 1790)
- Photedes fluxa (Hübner, 1809)
- Photedes morrisii (Dale, 1837)
- Phyllophila obliterata (Rambur, 1833)
- Plusia festucae (Linnaeus, 1758)
- Polia bombycina (Hufnagel, 1766)
- Polia serratilinea Ochsenheimer, 1816
- Polymixis bischoffii (Herrich-Schäffer, 1850)
- Polymixis culoti (Schawerda, 1921)
- Polymixis leuconota (Frivaldszky, 1841)
- Polymixis manisadijani (Staudinger, 1881)
- Polymixis polymita (Linnaeus, 1761)
- Polymixis rufocincta (Geyer, 1828)
- Polymixis serpentina (Treitschke, 1825)
- Polyphaenis sericata (Esper, 1787)
- Praestilbia armeniaca Staudinger, 1892
- Protoschinia scutosa (Denis & Schiffermüller, 1775)
- Pseudozarba bipartita (Herrich-Schäffer, 1850)
- Pyrrhia purpura (Hübner, 1817)
- Pyrrhia umbra (Hufnagel, 1766)
- Pyrrhia victorina (Sodoffsky, 1849)
- Rhizedra lutosa (Hübner, 1803)
- Rhyacia arenacea (Hampson, 1907)
- Rhyacia helvetina (Boisduval, 1833)
- Rhyacia lucipeta (Denis & Schiffermüller, 1775)
- Rhyacia nyctymerides (O. Bang-Haas, 1922)
- Rhyacia simulans (Hufnagel, 1766)
- Rileyiana fovea (Treitschke, 1825)
- Schinia cognata (Freyer, 1833)
- Scotochrosta pulla (Denis & Schiffermüller, 1775)
- Sesamia cretica Lederer, 1857
- Sesamia nonagrioides Lefebvre, 1827
- Sideridis implexa (Hübner, 1809)
- Sideridis reticulata (Goeze, 1781)
- Sideridis lampra (Schawerda, 1913)
- Simyra albovenosa (Goeze, 1781)
- Simyra dentinosa Freyer, 1838
- Simyra nervosa (Denis & Schiffermüller, 1775)
- Spaelotis ravida (Denis & Schiffermüller, 1775)
- Spaelotis senna (Freyer, 1829)
- Spodoptera cilium Guenée, 1852
- Spodoptera exigua (Hübner, 1808)
- Spodoptera littoralis (Boisduval, 1833)
- Standfussiana lucernea (Linnaeus, 1758)
- Standfussiana nictymera (Boisduval, 1834)
- Standfussiana sturanyi (Rebel, 1906)
- Stilbina olympica Dierl & Povolny, 1970
- Subacronicta megacephala (Denis & Schiffermüller, 1775)
- Teinoptera lunaki (Boursin, 1940)
- Teinoptera oliva (Staudinger, 1895)
- Teinoptera olivina (Herrich-Schäffer, 1852)
- Thalpophila matura (Hufnagel, 1766)
- Tholera cespitis (Denis & Schiffermüller, 1775)
- Tholera decimalis (Poda, 1761)
- Thysanoplusia circumscripta (Freyer, 1831)
- Thysanoplusia daubei (Boisduval, 1840)
- Thysanoplusia orichalcea (Fabricius, 1775)
- Tiliacea aurago (Denis & Schiffermüller, 1775)
- Tiliacea citrago (Linnaeus, 1758)
- Tiliacea cypreago (Hampson, 1906)
- Tiliacea sulphurago (Denis & Schiffermüller, 1775)
- Trachea atriplicis (Linnaeus, 1758)
- Trichoplusia ni (Hübner, 1803)
- Trigonophora flammea (Esper, 1785)
- Tyta luctuosa (Denis & Schiffermüller, 1775)
- Ulochlaena hirta (Hübner, 1813)
- Valeria oleagina (Denis & Schiffermüller, 1775)
- Xanthia gilvago (Denis & Schiffermüller, 1775)
- Xanthia icteritia (Hufnagel, 1766)
- Xanthia castanea Osthelder, 1933
- Xanthia togata (Esper, 1788)
- Xanthodes albago (Fabricius, 1794)
- Xestia ashworthii (Doubleday, 1855)
- Xestia c-nigrum (Linnaeus, 1758)
- Xestia triangulum (Hufnagel, 1766)
- Xestia baja (Denis & Schiffermüller, 1775)
- Xestia castanea (Esper, 1798)
- Xestia cohaesa (Herrich-Schäffer, 1849)
- Xestia ochreago (Hübner, 1809)
- Xestia palaestinensis (Kalchberg, 1897)
- Xestia stigmatica (Hübner, 1813)
- Xestia xanthographa (Denis & Schiffermüller, 1775)
- Xylena exsoleta (Linnaeus, 1758)
- Xylena lunifera Warren, 1910
- Xylena vetusta (Hübner, 1813)

=== Nolidae ===
- Bena bicolorana (Fuessly, 1775)
- Earias clorana (Linnaeus, 1761)
- Earias insulana (Boisduval, 1833)
- Earias vernana (Fabricius, 1787)
- Garella nilotica (Rogenhofer, 1882)
- Meganola albula (Denis & Schiffermüller, 1775)
- Meganola gigantula (Staudinger, 1879)
- Meganola impura (Mann, 1862)
- Meganola kolbi (Daniel, 1935)
- Meganola togatulalis (Hübner, 1796)
- Nola aerugula (Hübner, 1793)
- Nola chlamitulalis (Hübner, 1813)
- Nola confusalis (Herrich-Schäffer, 1847)
- Nola cucullatella (Linnaeus, 1758)
- Nola harouni (Wiltshire, 1951)
- Nola squalida Staudinger, 1871
- Nola subchlamydula Staudinger, 1871
- Nycteola asiatica (Krulikovsky, 1904)
- Nycteola columbana (Turner, 1925)
- Nycteola revayana (Scopoli, 1772)
- Nycteola siculana (Fuchs, 1899)
- Pseudoips prasinana (Linnaeus, 1758)

=== Notodontidae ===
- Cerura vinula (Linnaeus, 1758)
- Clostera anachoreta (Denis & Schiffermüller, 1775)
- Clostera anastomosis (Linnaeus, 1758)
- Clostera curtula (Linnaeus, 1758)
- Clostera pigra (Hufnagel, 1766)
- Dicranura ulmi (Denis & Schiffermüller, 1775)
- Drymonia dodonaea (Denis & Schiffermüller, 1775)
- Drymonia querna (Denis & Schiffermüller, 1775)
- Drymonia ruficornis (Hufnagel, 1766)
- Drymonia velitaris (Hufnagel, 1766)
- Furcula bifida (Brahm, 1787)
- Furcula furcula (Clerck, 1759)
- Harpyia milhauseri (Fabricius, 1775)
- Notodonta torva (Hübner, 1803)
- Notodonta tritophus (Denis & Schiffermüller, 1775)
- Notodonta ziczac (Linnaeus, 1758)
- Paradrymonia vittata (Staudinger, 1892)
- Peridea korbi (Rebel, 1918)
- Phalera bucephala (Linnaeus, 1758)
- Phalera bucephaloides (Ochsenheimer, 1810)
- Pterostoma palpina (Clerck, 1759)
- Ptilodon capucina (Linnaeus, 1758)
- Rhegmatophila alpina (Bellier, 1881)
- Spatalia argentina (Denis & Schiffermüller, 1775)
- Stauropus fagi (Linnaeus, 1758)
- Thaumetopoea pityocampa (Denis & Schiffermüller, 1775)
- Thaumetopoea processionea (Linnaeus, 1758)
- Thaumetopoea solitaria (Freyer, 1838)

=== Oecophoridae ===
- Batia lambdella (Donovan, 1793)
- Batia lunaris (Haworth, 1828)
- Batia lutosella Jackh, 1972
- Batia samosella Sutter, 2003
- Borkhausenia minutella (Linnaeus, 1758)
- Crossotocera wagnerella Zerny, 1930
- Dasycera imitatrix Zeller, 1847
- Dasycera krueperella Staudinger, 1870
- Dasycera oliviella (Fabricius, 1794)
- Decantha borkhausenii (Zeller, 1839)
- Denisia augustella (Hübner, 1796)
- Denisia rhaetica (Frey, 1856)
- Endrosis sarcitrella (Linnaeus, 1758)
- Epicallima formosella (Denis & Schiffermüller, 1775)
- Epicallima icterinella (Mann, 1867)
- Esperia sulphurella (Fabricius, 1775)
- Fabiola pokornyi (Nickerl, 1864)
- Harpella forficella (Scopoli, 1763)
- Holoscolia huebneri Kocak, 1980
- Holoscolia majorella Rebel, 1902
- Oecophora bractella (Linnaeus, 1758)
- Pleurota marginella (Denis & Schiffermüller, 1775)
- Pleurota arduella Rebel, 1906
- Pleurota aristella (Linnaeus, 1767)
- Pleurota bicostella (Clerck, 1759)
- Pleurota chalepensis Rebel, 1917
- Pleurota contristatella Mann, 1867
- Pleurota ericella (Duponchel, 1839)
- Pleurota filigerella Mann, 1867
- Pleurota metricella (Zeller, 1847)
- Pleurota nitens Staudinger, 1870
- Pleurota planella (Staudinger, 1859)
- Pleurota protasella Staudinger, 1883
- Pleurota pungitiella Herrich-Schäffer, 1854
- Pleurota pyropella (Denis & Schiffermüller, 1775)
- Pleurota tristatella Staudinger, 1870
- Pleurota vittalba Staudinger, 1871
- Pleurota creticella Rebel, 1916
- Schiffermuelleria schaefferella (Linnaeus, 1758)

=== Opostegidae ===
- Opostega salaciella (Treitschke, 1833)
- Opostega spatulella Herrich-Schäffer, 1855
- Opostegoides menthinella (Mann, 1855)
- Pseudopostega crepusculella (Zeller, 1839)

=== Peleopodidae ===
- Carcina quercana (Fabricius, 1775)

=== Plutellidae ===
- Eidophasia messingiella (Fischer von Röslerstamm, 1840)
- Eidophasia syenitella Herrich-Schäffer, 1854
- Plutella xylostella (Linnaeus, 1758)
- Rhigognostis annulatella (Curtis, 1832)
- Rhigognostis wolfschlaegeri (Rebel, 1940)

=== Praydidae ===
- Prays citri (Milliere, 1873)
- Prays oleae (Bernard, 1788)

=== Prodoxidae ===
- Lampronia rupella (Denis & Schiffermüller, 1775)

=== Psychidae ===
- Acanthopsyche ecksteini (Lederer, 1855)
- Anaproutia reticulatella (Bruand, 1853)
- Apterona helicinella (Herrich-Schäffer, 1846)
- Apterona helicoidella (Vallot, 1827)
- Bijugis bombycella (Denis & Schiffermüller, 1775)
- Bijugis pectinella (Denis & Schiffermüller, 1775)
- Canephora hirsuta (Poda, 1761)
- Dahlica achajensis (Sieder, 1966)
- Dahlica pseudoachajensis (Stengel, 1990)
- Dahlica thessaliensis Weidlich, 2008
- Dahlica triquetrella (Hübner, 1813)
- Eochorica balcanica (Rebel, 1919)
- Epichnopterix plumella (Denis & Schiffermüller, 1775)
- Epichnopterix sieboldi (Reutti, 1853)
- Eumasia parietariella (Heydenreich, 1851)
- Heliopsychidea graecella (Milliere, 1866)
- Loebelia crassicornis (Staudinger, 1870)
- Luffia lapidella (Goeze, 1783)
- Megalophanes viciella (Denis & Schiffermüller, 1775)
- Montanima predotae Sieder, 1949
- Narycia astrella (Herrich-Schäffer, 1851)
- Oiketicoides febretta (Boyer de Fonscolombe, 1835)
- Oiketicoides lutea (Staudinger, 1870)
- Pachythelia villosella (Ochsenheimer, 1810)
- Peloponnesia culminella Sieder, 1961
- Peloponnesia glaphyrella (Rebel, 1906)
- Peloponnesia haettenschwileri Hauser, 1996
- Penestoglossa dardoinella (Milliere, 1863)
- Phalacropterix praecellens (Staudinger, 1870)
- Pseudobankesia arahova Stengel, 1990
- Pseudobankesia darwini Stengel, 1990
- Pseudobankesia hauseriella Henderickx, 1998
- Psyche casta (Pallas, 1767)
- Psyche crassiorella Bruand, 1851
- Ptilocephala albida (Esper, 1786)
- Reisseronia magna Hattenschwiler, 1982
- Reisseronia malickyi Hauser, 1996
- Reisseronia nigrociliella (Rebel, 1934)
- Reisseronia pusilella (Rebel, 1941)
- Stichobasis helicinoides (Heylaerts, 1879)
- Typhonia christenseni Hattenschwiler, 1990
- Typhonia ciliaris (Ochsenheimer, 1810)

=== Pterolonchidae ===
- Pterolonche albescens Zeller, 1847
- Pterolonche inspersa Staudinger, 1859

=== Pterophoridae ===
- Adaina microdactyla (Hübner, 1813)
- Agdistis adactyla (Hübner, 1819)
- Agdistis bennetii (Curtis, 1833)
- Agdistis bigoti Arenberger, 1976
- Agdistis cypriota Arenberger, 1983
- Agdistis frankeniae (Zeller, 1847)
- Agdistis hartigi Arenberger, 1973
- Agdistis heydeni (Zeller, 1852)
- Agdistis hulli Gielis, 1998
- Agdistis meridionalis (Zeller, 1847)
- Agdistis paralia (Zeller, 1847)
- Agdistis satanas Milliere, 1875
- Agdistis tamaricis (Zeller, 1847)
- Amblyptilia acanthadactyla (Hübner, 1813)
- Calyciphora albodactylus (Fabricius, 1794)
- Calyciphora homoiodactyla (Kasy, 1960)
- Calyciphora nephelodactyla (Eversmann, 1844)
- Capperia celeusi (Frey, 1886)
- Capperia fusca (O. Hofmann, 1898)
- Capperia hellenica Adamczewski, 1951
- Capperia maratonica Adamczewski, 1951
- Capperia marginellus (Zeller, 1847)
- Capperia polonica Adamczewski, 1951
- Capperia trichodactyla (Denis & Schiffermüller, 1775)
- Capperia washbourni Adamczewski, 1951
- Cnaemidophorus rhododactyla (Denis & Schiffermüller, 1775)
- Crombrugghia distans (Zeller, 1847)
- Crombrugghia laetus (Zeller, 1847)
- Crombrugghia tristis (Zeller, 1841)
- Emmelina monodactyla (Linnaeus, 1758)
- Gillmeria pallidactyla (Haworth, 1811)
- Hellinsia carphodactyla (Hübner, 1813)
- Hellinsia distinctus (Herrich-Schäffer, 1855)
- Hellinsia inulae (Zeller, 1852)
- Hellinsia pectodactylus (Staudinger, 1859)
- Hellinsia tephradactyla (Hübner, 1813)
- Merrifieldia baliodactylus (Zeller, 1841)
- Merrifieldia leucodactyla (Denis & Schiffermüller, 1775)
- Merrifieldia malacodactylus (Zeller, 1847)
- Merrifieldia tridactyla (Linnaeus, 1758)
- Oidaematophorus lithodactyla (Treitschke, 1833)
- Oxyptilus ericetorum (Stainton, 1851)
- Oxyptilus parvidactyla (Haworth, 1811)
- Paracapperia anatolicus (Caradja, 1920)
- Platyptilia farfarellus Zeller, 1867
- Platyptilia gonodactyla (Denis & Schiffermüller, 1775)
- Platyptilia tesseradactyla (Linnaeus, 1761)
- Procapperia linariae (Chrétien, 1922)
- Pselnophorus heterodactyla (Muller, 1764)
- Pterophorus ischnodactyla (Treitschke, 1835)
- Pterophorus pentadactyla (Linnaeus, 1758)
- Puerphorus olbiadactylus (Milliere, 1859)
- Stangeia siceliota (Zeller, 1847)
- Stenoptilia aridus (Zeller, 1847)
- Stenoptilia bipunctidactyla (Scopoli, 1763)
- Stenoptilia coprodactylus (Stainton, 1851)
- Stenoptilia elkefi Arenberger, 1984
- Stenoptilia lucasi Arenberger, 1990
- Stenoptilia parnasia Arenberger, 1986
- Stenoptilia pterodactyla (Linnaeus, 1761)
- Stenoptilia stigmatodactylus (Zeller, 1852)
- Stenoptilia zophodactylus (Duponchel, 1840)
- Stenoptilodes taprobanes (Felder & Rogenhofer, 1875)
- Wheeleria ivae (Kasy, 1960)
- Wheeleria lyrae (Arenberger, 1983)
- Wheeleria obsoletus (Zeller, 1841)
- Wheeleria phlomidis (Staudinger, 1871)
- Wheeleria spilodactylus (Curtis, 1827)

=== Pyralidae ===
- Acrobasis advenella (Zincken, 1818)
- Acrobasis bithynella Zeller, 1848
- Acrobasis centunculella (Mann, 1859)
- Acrobasis consociella (Hübner, 1813)
- Acrobasis dulcella (Zeller, 1848)
- Acrobasis glaucella Staudinger, 1859
- Acrobasis legatea (Haworth, 1811)
- Acrobasis marmorea (Haworth, 1811)
- Acrobasis obliqua (Zeller, 1847)
- Acrobasis obtusella (Hübner, 1796)
- Acrobasis repandana (Fabricius, 1798)
- Acrobasis sodalella Zeller, 1848
- Acrobasis suavella (Zincken, 1818)
- Acrobasis tumidana (Denis & Schiffermüller, 1775)
- Aglossa asiatica Erschoff, 1872
- Aglossa caprealis (Hübner, 1809)
- Aglossa pinguinalis (Linnaeus, 1758)
- Aglossa signicostalis Staudinger, 1871
- Alophia combustella (Herrich-Schäffer, 1855)
- Ancylodes pallens Ragonot, 1887
- Ancylosis cinnamomella (Duponchel, 1836)
- Ancylosis convexella (Lederer, 1855)
- Ancylosis hellenica (Staudinger, 1871)
- Ancylosis oblitella (Zeller, 1848)
- Ancylosis pallida (Staudinger, 1870)
- Ancylosis roscidella (Eversmann, 1844)
- Ancylosis sareptalla (Herrich-Schäffer, 1861)
- Aphomia sociella (Linnaeus, 1758)
- Aphomia unicolor (Staudinger, 1880)
- Aphomia zelleri de Joannis, 1932
- Apomyelois ceratoniae (Zeller, 1839)
- Apomyelois cognata (Staudinger, 1871)
- Asalebria florella (Mann, 1862)
- Bostra obsoletalis (Mann, 1884)
- Bradyrrhoa cantenerella (Duponchel, 1837)
- Bradyrrhoa confiniella Zeller, 1848
- Bradyrrhoa gilveolella (Treitschke, 1832)
- Cadra abstersella (Zeller, 1847)
- Cadra calidella (Guenée, 1845)
- Cadra cautella (Walker, 1863)
- Cadra delattinella Roesler, 1965
- Cadra figulilella (Gregson, 1871)
- Cadra furcatella (Herrich-Schäffer, 1849)
- Catastia marginea (Denis & Schiffermüller, 1775)
- Corcyra cephalonica (Stainton, 1866)
- Cryptoblabes gnidiella (Milliere, 1867)
- Delplanqueia dilutella (Denis & Schiffermüller, 1775)
- Denticera divisella (Duponchel, 1842)
- Dioryctria abietella (Denis & Schiffermüller, 1775)
- Dioryctria mendacella (Staudinger, 1859)
- Dioryctria pineae (Staudinger, 1859)
- Dioryctria resiniphila Segerer & Prose, 1997
- Dioryctria sylvestrella (Ratzeburg, 1840)
- Eccopisa effractella Zeller, 1848
- Elegia fallax (Staudinger, 1881)
- Elegia similella (Zincken, 1818)
- Ematheudes punctella (Treitschke, 1833)
- Endotricha flammealis (Denis & Schiffermüller, 1775)
- Ephestia cypriusella (Roesler, 1965)
- Ephestia disparella Hampson, 1901
- Ephestia elutella (Hübner, 1796)
- Ephestia kuehniella Zeller, 1879
- Ephestia unicolorella Staudinger, 1881
- Ephestia welseriella (Zeller, 1848)
- Epidauria strigosa (Staudinger, 1879)
- Epidauria transversariella (Zeller, 1848)
- Epischnia adultella Zeller, 1848
- Epischnia cretaciella Mann, 1869
- Epischnia illotella Zeller, 1839
- Epischnia leucoloma Herrich-Schäffer, 1849
- Epischnia prodromella (Hübner, 1799)
- Etiella zinckenella (Treitschke, 1832)
- Eurhodope cirrigerella (Zincken, 1818)
- Eurhodope incompta (Zeller, 1847)
- Eurhodope rosella (Scopoli, 1763)
- Euzophera bigella (Zeller, 1848)
- Euzophera cinerosella (Zeller, 1839)
- Euzophera formosella (Rebel, 1910)
- Euzophera fuliginosella (Heinemann, 1865)
- Euzophera lunulella (O. Costa, 1836)
- Euzophera nessebarella Soffner, 1962
- Euzophera osseatella (Treitschke, 1832)
- Euzophera pinguis (Haworth, 1811)
- Euzophera pulchella Ragonot, 1887
- Euzophera umbrosella (Staudinger, 1879)
- Euzopherodes lutisignella (Mann, 1869)
- Euzopherodes vapidella (Mann, 1857)
- Faveria dionysia (Zeller, 1846)
- Galleria mellonella (Linnaeus, 1758)
- Gymnancyla canella (Denis & Schiffermüller, 1775)
- Gymnancyla hornigii (Lederer, 1852)
- Homoeosoma nebulella (Denis & Schiffermüller, 1775)
- Homoeosoma nimbella (Duponchel, 1837)
- Homoeosoma sinuella (Fabricius, 1794)
- Hypochalcia ahenella (Denis & Schiffermüller, 1775)
- Hypochalcia lignella (Hübner, 1796)
- Hypotia corticalis (Denis & Schiffermüller, 1775)
- Hypsopygia costalis (Fabricius, 1775)
- Hypsopygia fulvocilialis (Duponchel, 1834)
- Hypsopygia glaucinalis (Linnaeus, 1758)
- Hypsopygia incarnatalis (Zeller, 1847)
- Hypsopygia rubidalis (Denis & Schiffermüller, 1775)
- Hypsotropa limbella Zeller, 1848
- Insalebria serraticornella (Zeller, 1839)
- Isauria dilucidella (Duponchel, 1836)
- Keradere lepidella (Ragonot, 1887)
- Keradere tengstroemiella (Erschoff, 1874)
- Khorassania compositella (Treitschke, 1835)
- Klimeschiola philetella (Rebel, 1916)
- Lamoria anella (Denis & Schiffermüller, 1775)
- Lamoria ruficostella Ragonot, 1888
- Loryma egregialis (Herrich-Schäffer, 1838)
- Matilella fusca (Haworth, 1811)
- Megasis rippertella (Zeller, 1839)
- Metallosticha argyrogrammos (Zeller, 1847)
- Metallostichodes nigrocyanella (Constant, 1865)
- Michaeliodes friesei Roesler, 1969
- Moitrelia obductella (Zeller, 1839)
- Myelois circumvoluta (Fourcroy, 1785)
- Myelois pluripunctella Ragonot, 1887
- Neurotomia coenulentella (Zeller, 1846)
- Nyctegretis lineana (Scopoli, 1786)
- Nyctegretis triangulella Ragonot, 1901
- Oncocera semirubella (Scopoli, 1763)
- Oxybia transversella (Duponchel, 1836)
- Pempelia alpigenella (Duponchel, 1836)
- Pempelia amoenella (Zeller, 1848)
- Pempelia johannella (Caradja, 1916)
- Pempelia palumbella (Denis & Schiffermüller, 1775)
- Pempeliella ornatella (Denis & Schiffermüller, 1775)
- Pempeliella sororculella (Ragonot, 1887)
- Pempeliella sororiella Zeller, 1839
- Phycita coronatella (Guenée, 1845)
- Phycita diaphana (Staudinger, 1870)
- Phycita meliella (Mann, 1864)
- Phycita metzneri (Zeller, 1846)
- Phycita pedisignella Ragonot, 1887
- Phycita poteriella (Zeller, 1846)
- Phycita roborella (Denis & Schiffermüller, 1775)
- Phycitodes albatella (Ragonot, 1887)
- Phycitodes binaevella (Hübner, 1813)
- Phycitodes inquinatella (Ragonot, 1887)
- Phycitodes lacteella (Rothschild, 1915)
- Phycitodes saxicola (Vaughan, 1870)
- Plodia interpunctella (Hübner, 1813)
- Polyocha venosa (Zeller, 1847)
- Psorosa dahliella (Treitschke, 1832)
- Pterothrixidia rufella (Duponchel, 1836)
- Pyralis farinalis (Linnaeus, 1758)
- Pyralis papaleonei (Huemer, Kaila & Segerer, 2026)
- Pyralis regalis (Denis & Schiffermüller, 1775)
- Raphimetopus ablutella (Zeller, 1839)
- Sciota hostilis (Stephens, 1834)
- Sciota imperialella (Ragonot, 1887)
- Selagia argyrella (Denis & Schiffermüller, 1775)
- Selagia spadicella (Hübner, 1796)
- Selagia subochrella (Herrich-Schäffer, 1849)
- Seleucia pectinella (Chrétien, 1911)
- Seleucia semirosella Ragonot, 1887
- Stemmatophora brunnealis (Treitschke, 1829)
- Stemmatophora combustalis (Fischer v. Röslerstamm, 1842)
- Stemmatophora honestalis (Treitschke, 1829)
- Synaphe moldavica (Esper, 1794)
- Synaphe punctalis (Fabricius, 1775)
- Synoria antiquella (Herrich-Schäffer, 1855)
- Trachonitis cristella (Denis & Schiffermüller, 1775)
- Tretopteryx pertusalis (Geyer, 1832)
- Zophodia grossulariella (Hübner, 1809)

=== Saturniidae ===
- Aglia tau (Linnaeus, 1758)
- Saturnia pavoniella (Scopoli, 1763)
- Saturnia spini (Denis & Schiffermüller, 1775)
- Saturnia caecigena Kupido, 1825
- Saturnia pyri (Denis & Schiffermüller, 1775)

=== Scythrididae ===
- Enolmis desidella (Lederer, 1855)
- Episcythris triangulella (Ragonot, 1874)
- Scythris aerariella (Herrich-Schäffer, 1855)
- Scythris albidella (Stainton, 1867)
- Scythris albostriata Hannemann, 1961
- Scythris ambustella Bengtsson, 1997
- Scythris anomaloptera (Staudinger, 1880)
- Scythris apicistrigella (Staudinger, 1870)
- Scythris braschiella (O. Hofmann, 1897)
- Scythris clavella (Zeller, 1855)
- Scythris confluens (Staudinger, 1870)
- Scythris crassiuscula (Herrich-Schäffer, 1855)
- Scythris crypta Hannemann, 1961
- Scythris cuspidella (Denis & Schiffermüller, 1775)
- Scythris cycladeae Jackh, 1978
- Scythris eberhardi Bengtsson, 1997
- Scythris fallacella (Schlager, 1847)
- Scythris flavilaterella (Fuchs, 1886)
- Scythris fuscoaenea (Haworth, 1828)
- Scythris gravatella (Zeller, 1847)
- Scythris hungaricella Rebel, 1917
- Scythris inclusella Lederer, 1855
- Scythris inertella (Zeller, 1855)
- Scythris jaeckhi Bengtsson, 1989
- Scythris lafauryi Passerin d'Entreves, 1986
- Scythris laminella (Denis & Schiffermüller, 1775)
- Scythris limbella (Fabricius, 1775)
- Scythris mus Walsingham, 1898
- Scythris obscurella (Scopoli, 1763)
- Scythris parnassiae Bengtsson, 1997
- Scythris pascuella (Zeller, 1855)
- Scythris paullella (Herrich-Schäffer, 1855)
- Scythris platypyga (Staudinger, 1880)
- Scythris pudorinella (Moschler, 1866)
- Scythris punctivittella (O. Costa, 1836)
- Scythris scopolella (Linnaeus, 1767)
- Scythris seliniella (Zeller, 1839)
- Scythris siccella (Zeller, 1839)
- Scythris similis Hannemann, 1961
- Scythris skulei Bengtsson, 1997
- Scythris subaerariella (Stainton, 1867)
- Scythris subschleichiella Hannemann, 1961
- Scythris tabescentella (Staudinger, 1880)
- Scythris tabidella (Herrich-Schäffer, 1855)
- Scythris taygeticola Scholz, 1997
- Scythris tenuivittella (Stainton, 1867)
- Scythris tergestinella (Zeller, 1855)
- Scythris tributella (Zeller, 1847)
- Scythris vittella (O. Costa, 1834)

=== Sesiidae ===
- Bembecia albanensis (Rebel, 1918)
- Bembecia blanka Spatenka, 2001
- Bembecia fokidensis Tosevski, 1991
- Bembecia ichneumoniformis (Denis & Schiffermüller, 1775)
- Bembecia lomatiaeformis (Lederer, 1853)
- Bembecia megillaeformis (Hübner, 1813)
- Bembecia pavicevici Tosevski, 1989
- Bembecia priesneri Kallies, Petersen & Riefenstahl, 1998
- Bembecia puella Z. Lastuvka, 1989
- Bembecia sanguinolenta (Lederer, 1853)
- Bembecia scopigera (Scopoli, 1763)
- Bembecia uroceriformis (Treitschke, 1834)
- Chamaesphecia aerifrons (Zeller, 1847)
- Chamaesphecia albiventris (Lederer, 1853)
- Chamaesphecia alysoniformis (Herrich-Schäffer, 1846)
- Chamaesphecia anatolica Schwingenschuss, 1938
- Chamaesphecia annellata (Zeller, 1847)
- Chamaesphecia astatiformis (Herrich-Schäffer, 1846)
- Chamaesphecia bibioniformis (Esper, 1800)
- Chamaesphecia chalciformis (Esper, 1804)
- Chamaesphecia doleriformis (Herrich-Schäffer, 1846)
- Chamaesphecia dumonti Le Cerf, 1922
- Chamaesphecia empiformis (Esper, 1783)
- Chamaesphecia gorbunovi Spatenka, 1992
- Chamaesphecia masariformis (Ochsenheimer, 1808)
- Chamaesphecia minoica Bartsch & Puhringer, 2005
- Chamaesphecia nigrifrons (Le Cerf, 1911)
- Chamaesphecia proximata (Staudinger, 1891)
- Chamaesphecia schmidtiiformis (Freyer, 1836)
- Chamaesphecia tenthrediniformis (Denis & Schiffermüller, 1775)
- Chamaesphecia thracica Z. Lastuvka, 1983
- Osminia fenusaeformis (Herrich-Schäffer, 1852)
- Paranthrene insolitus Le Cerf, 1914
- Paranthrene tabaniformis (Rottemburg, 1775)
- Pennisetia bohemica Kralicek & Povolny, 1974
- Pennisetia hylaeiformis (Laspeyres, 1801)
- Pyropteron affinis (Staudinger, 1856)
- Pyropteron leucomelaena (Zeller, 1847)
- Pyropteron minianiformis (Freyer, 1843)
- Pyropteron muscaeformis (Esper, 1783)
- Pyropteron triannuliformis (Freyer, 1843)
- Pyropteron umbrifera (Staudinger, 1870)
- Sesia apiformis (Clerck, 1759)
- Sesia pimplaeformis Oberthur, 1872
- Synanthedon andrenaeformis (Laspeyres, 1801)
- Synanthedon cephiformis (Ochsenheimer, 1808)
- Synanthedon conopiformis (Esper, 1782)
- Synanthedon culiciformis (Linnaeus, 1758)
- Synanthedon formicaeformis (Esper, 1783)
- Synanthedon geranii Kallies, 1997
- Synanthedon loranthi (Kralicek, 1966)
- Synanthedon mesiaeformis (Herrich-Schäffer, 1846)
- Synanthedon myopaeformis (Borkhausen, 1789)
- Synanthedon rubiana Kallies, Petersen & Riefenstahl, 1998
- Synanthedon spuleri (Fuchs, 1908)
- Synanthedon stomoxiformis (Hübner, 1790)
- Synanthedon tipuliformis (Clerck, 1759)
- Synanthedon vespiformis (Linnaeus, 1761)
- Tinthia brosiformis (Hübner, 1813)
- Tinthia hoplisiformis (Mann, 1864)
- Tinthia myrmosaeformis (Herrich-Schäffer, 1846)
- Tinthia tineiformis (Esper, 1789)

=== Sphingidae ===
- Acherontia atropos (Linnaeus, 1758)
- Agrius convolvuli (Linnaeus, 1758)
- Daphnis nerii (Linnaeus, 1758)
- Deilephila elpenor (Linnaeus, 1758)
- Deilephila porcellus (Linnaeus, 1758)
- Dolbina elegans A. Bang-Haas, 1912
- Hemaris croatica (Esper, 1800)
- Hemaris fuciformis (Linnaeus, 1758)
- Hemaris tityus (Linnaeus, 1758)
- Hippotion celerio (Linnaeus, 1758)
- Hyles cretica Eitschberger, Danner & Surholt, 1998
- Hyles euphorbiae (Linnaeus, 1758)
- Hyles hippophaes (Esper, 1789)
- Hyles livornica (Esper, 1780)
- Hyles nicaea (de Prunner, 1798)
- Hyles vespertilio (Esper, 1780)
- Laothoe populi (Linnaeus, 1758)
- Macroglossum stellatarum (Linnaeus, 1758)
- Marumba quercus (Denis & Schiffermüller, 1775)
- Mimas tiliae (Linnaeus, 1758)
- Proserpinus proserpina (Pallas, 1772)
- Rethera komarovi (Christoph, 1885)
- Smerinthus ocellata (Linnaeus, 1758)
- Sphingoneopsis gorgoniades (Hübner, 1819)
- Sphinx ligustri Linnaeus, 1758
- Sphinx pinastri Linnaeus, 1758
- Theretra alecto (Linnaeus, 1758)

=== Stathmopodidae ===
- Neomariania partinicensis (Rebel, 1937)
- Tortilia graeca Kasy, 1981

=== Thyrididae ===
- Thyris fenestrella (Scopoli, 1763)

=== Tineidae ===
- Anomalotinea gardesanella (Hartig, 1950)
- Anomalotinea liguriella (Milliere, 1879)
- Archinemapogon yildizae Kocak, 1981
- Ateliotum hungaricellum Zeller, 1839
- Ateliotum petrinella (Herrich-Schäffer, 1854)
- Ateliotum syriaca (Caradja, 1920)
- Cephimallota angusticostella (Zeller, 1839)
- Ceratuncus danubiella (Mann, 1866)
- Crassicornella crassicornella (Zeller, 1847)
- Dryadaula hellenica (Gaedike, 1988)
- Edosa fuscoviolacella (Ragonot, 1895)
- Eudarcia armatum (Gaedike, 1985)
- Eudarcia glaseri (Petersen, 1967)
- Eudarcia montanum (Gaedike, 1985)
- Eudarcia sutteri Gaedike, 1997
- Eudarcia verkerki Gaedike & Henderickx, 1999
- Eudarcia hellenica Gaedike, 2007
- Eudarcia lobata (Petersen & Gaedike, 1979)
- Eudarcia confusella (Heydenreich, 1851)
- Eudarcia fibigeri Gaedike, 1997
- Eudarcia forsteri (Petersen, 1964)
- Eudarcia graecum (Gaedike, 1985)
- Eudarcia kasyi (Petersen, 1971)
- Eudarcia moreae (Petersen & Gaedike, 1983)
- Eudarcia holtzi (Rebel, 1902)
- Euplocamus anthracinalis (Scopoli, 1763)
- Euplocamus ophisus (Cramer, 1779)
- Gaedikeia kokkariensis Sutter, 1998
- Hapsifera luridella Zeller, 1847
- Infurcitinea albicomella (Stainton, 1851)
- Infurcitinea arenbergeri Gaedike, 1988
- Infurcitinea finalis Gozmány, 1959
- Infurcitinea graeca Gaedike, 1983
- Infurcitinea hellenica Gaedike, 1997
- Infurcitinea karsholti Gaedike, 1992
- Infurcitinea lakoniae Gaedike, 1983
- Infurcitinea litochorella Petersen, 1964
- Infurcitinea nedae Gaedike, 1983
- Infurcitinea nigropluviella (Walsingham, 1907)
- Infurcitinea ochridella Petersen, 1962
- Infurcitinea olympica Petersen, 1958
- Infurcitinea parnassiella Gaedike, 1987
- Infurcitinea reisseri Petersen, 1968
- Infurcitinea rumelicella (Rebel, 1903)
- Infurcitinea tauridella Petersen, 1968
- Infurcitinea taurus Gaedike, 1988
- Infurcitinea tribertii Gaedike, 1983
- Lichenotinea pustulatella (Zeller, 1852)
- Matratinea rufulicaput Sziraki & Szocs, 1990
- Monopis crocicapitella (Clemens, 1859)
- Monopis imella (Hübner, 1813)
- Monopis laevigella (Denis & Schiffermüller, 1775)
- Monopis obviella (Denis & Schiffermüller, 1775)
- Monopis weaverella (Scott, 1858)
- Morophaga choragella (Denis & Schiffermüller, 1775)
- Morophaga morella (Duponchel, 1838)
- Myrmecozela parnassiella (Rebel, 1915)
- Myrmecozela stepicola Zagulajev, 1972
- Nemapogon anatolica Gaedike, 1986
- Nemapogon arenbergeri Gaedike, 1986
- Nemapogon cloacella (Haworth, 1828)
- Nemapogon falstriella (Bang-Haas, 1881)
- Nemapogon granella (Linnaeus, 1758)
- Nemapogon gravosaellus Petersen, 1957
- Nemapogon hungaricus Gozmány, 1960
- Nemapogon inconditella (Lucas, 1956)
- Nemapogon orientalis Petersen, 1961
- Nemapogon reisseri Petersen & Gaedike, 1983
- Nemapogon ruricolella (Stainton, 1849)
- Nemapogon scholzi Sutter, 2000
- Nemapogon scutifera Gaedike, 2007
- Nemapogon signatellus Petersen, 1957
- Nemapogon variatella (Clemens, 1859)
- Neurothaumasia ankerella (Mann, 1867)
- Neurothaumasia macedonica Petersen, 1962
- Niditinea fuscella (Linnaeus, 1758)
- Niditinea striolella (Matsumura, 1931)
- Novotinea klimeschi (Rebel, 1940)
- Oinophila v-flava (Haworth, 1828)
- Proterospastis merdella (Zeller, 1847)
- Reisserita relicinella (Herrich-Schäffer, 1853)
- Rhodobates unicolor (Staudinger, 1870)
- Scardia boletella (Fabricius, 1794)
- Stenoptinea cyaneimarmorella (Milliere, 1854)
- Tenaga nigripunctella (Haworth, 1828)
- Tenaga rhenania (Petersen, 1962)
- Tinea basifasciella Ragonot, 1895
- Tinea columbariella Wocke, 1877
- Tinea flavescentella Haworth, 1828
- Tinea messalina Robinson, 1979
- Tinea murariella Staudinger, 1859
- Tinea pellionella Linnaeus, 1758
- Tinea translucens Meyrick, 1917
- Tinea trinotella Thunberg, 1794
- Triaxomasia caprimulgella (Stainton, 1851)
- Triaxomera parasitella (Hübner, 1796)
- Trichophaga bipartitella (Ragonot, 1892)
- Trichophaga tapetzella (Linnaeus, 1758)

=== Tischeriidae ===
- Coptotriche gaunacella (Duponchel, 1843)
- Coptotriche marginea (Haworth, 1828)
- Tischeria dodonaea Stainton, 1858
- Tischeria ekebladella (Bjerkander, 1795)

=== Tortricidae ===
- Acleris boscanoides Razowski, 1959
- Acleris forsskaleana (Linnaeus, 1758)
- Acleris hastiana (Linnaeus, 1758)
- Acleris lipsiana (Denis & Schiffermüller, 1775)
- Acleris quercinana (Zeller, 1849)
- Acleris schalleriana (Linnaeus, 1761)
- Acleris variegana (Denis & Schiffermüller, 1775)
- Adoxophyes orana (Fischer v. Röslerstamm, 1834)
- Aethes bilbaensis (Rossler, 1877)
- Aethes flagellana (Duponchel, 1836)
- Aethes francillana (Fabricius, 1794)
- Aethes hartmanniana (Clerck, 1759)
- Aethes margarotana (Duponchel, 1836)
- Aethes mauritanica (Walsingham, 1898)
- Aethes nefandana (Kennel, 1899)
- Aethes sanguinana (Treitschke, 1830)
- Aethes tesserana (Denis & Schiffermüller, 1775)
- Aethes triangulana (Treitschke, 1835)
- Aethes williana (Brahm, 1791)
- Agapeta largana (Rebel, 1906)
- Agapeta zoegana (Linnaeus, 1767)
- Aleimma loeflingiana (Linnaeus, 1758)
- Ancylis achatana (Denis & Schiffermüller, 1775)
- Ancylis apicella (Denis & Schiffermüller, 1775)
- Ancylis comptana (Frolich, 1828)
- Ancylis selenana (Guenée, 1845)
- Ancylis unguicella (Linnaeus, 1758)
- Aphelia euxina (Djakonov, 1929)
- Aphelia ferugana (Hübner, 1793)
- Archips crataegana (Hübner, 1799)
- Archips podana (Scopoli, 1763)
- Archips rosana (Linnaeus, 1758)
- Archips xylosteana (Linnaeus, 1758)
- Argyrotaenia ljungiana (Thunberg, 1797)
- Avaria hyerana (Milliere, 1858)
- Bactra bactrana (Kennel, 1901)
- Bactra furfurana (Haworth, 1811)
- Bactra lancealana (Hübner, 1799)
- Bactra venosana (Zeller, 1847)
- Cacoecimorpha pronubana (Hübner, 1799)
- Capua vulgana (Frolich, 1828)
- Celypha lacunana (Denis & Schiffermüller, 1775)
- Celypha rurestrana (Duponchel, 1843)
- Celypha striana (Denis & Schiffermüller, 1775)
- Celypha woodiana (Barrett, 1882)
- Choristoneura hebenstreitella (Muller, 1764)
- Choristoneura murinana (Hübner, 1799)
- Clepsis consimilana (Hübner, 1817)
- Clepsis pallidana (Fabricius, 1776)
- Clepsis steineriana (Hübner, 1799)
- Cnephasia asseclana (Denis & Schiffermüller, 1775)
- Cnephasia communana (Herrich-Schäffer, 1851)
- Cnephasia cupressivorana (Staudinger, 1871)
- Cnephasia disforma Razowski, 1983
- Cnephasia divisana Razowski, 1959
- Cnephasia ecullyana Real, 1951
- Cnephasia fragosana (Zeller, 1847)
- Cnephasia graecana Rebel, 1902
- Cnephasia gueneeana (Duponchel, 1836)
- Cnephasia hellenica Obraztsov, 1956
- Cnephasia heringi Razowski, 1958
- Cnephasia longana (Haworth, 1811)
- Cnephasia parnassicola Razowski, 1958
- Cnephasia pasiuana (Hübner, 1799)
- Cnephasia pumicana (Zeller, 1847)
- Cnephasia stephensiana (Doubleday, 1849)
- Cnephasia tofina Meyrick, 1922
- Cnephasia abrasana (Duponchel, 1843)
- Cnephasia incertana (Treitschke, 1835)
- Cochylidia heydeniana (Herrich-Schäffer, 1851)
- Cochylidia subroseana (Haworth, 1811)
- Cochylimorpha meridiana (Staudinger, 1859)
- Cochylimorpha straminea (Haworth, 1811)
- Cochylis defessana (Mann, 1861)
- Cochylis epilinana Duponchel, 1842
- Cochylis molliculana Zeller, 1847
- Cochylis nana (Haworth, 1811)
- Cochylis pallidana Zeller, 1847
- Cochylis posterana Zeller, 1847
- Crocidosema plebejana Zeller, 1847
- Cryptocochylis conjunctana (Mann, 1864)
- Cydia alienana (Caradja, 1916)
- Cydia amplana (Hübner, 1800)
- Cydia blackmoreana (Walsingham, 1903)
- Cydia conicolana (Heylaerts, 1874)
- Cydia corollana (Hübner, 1823)
- Cydia duplicana (Zetterstedt, 1839)
- Cydia fagiglandana (Zeller, 1841)
- Cydia honorana (Herrich-Schäffer, 1851)
- Cydia ilipulana (Walsingham, 1903)
- Cydia johanssoni Aarvik & Karsholt, 1993
- Cydia plumbiferana (Staudinger, 1870)
- Cydia pomonella (Linnaeus, 1758)
- Cydia pyrivora (Danilevsky, 1947)
- Cydia semicinctana (Kennel, 1901)
- Cydia splendana (Hübner, 1799)
- Cydia succedana (Denis & Schiffermüller, 1775)
- Cydia trogodana Prose, 1988
- Diceratura ostrinana (Guenée, 1845)
- Diceratura rhodograpta Djakonov, 1929
- Dichelia histrionana (Frolich, 1828)
- Dichrorampha inconspicua (Danilevsky, 1948)
- Dichrorampha incursana (Herrich-Schäffer, 1851)
- Dichrorampha lasithicana Rebel, 1916
- Dichrorampha montanana (Duponchel, 1843)
- Dichrorampha petiverella (Linnaeus, 1758)
- Dichrorampha plumbagana (Treitschke, 1830)
- Dichrorampha plumbana (Scopoli, 1763)
- Eana derivana (de La Harpe, 1858)
- Eana italica (Obraztsov, 1950)
- Eana penziana (Thunberg, 1791)
- Eana argentana (Clerck, 1759)
- Eana canescana (Guenée, 1845)
- Endothenia gentianaeana (Hübner, 1799)
- Endothenia oblongana (Haworth, 1811)
- Endothenia sororiana (Herrich-Schäffer, 1850)
- Epagoge grotiana (Fabricius, 1781)
- Epiblema costipunctana (Haworth, 1811)
- Epiblema cretana Osthelder, 1941
- Epiblema foenella (Linnaeus, 1758)
- Epiblema gammana (Mann, 1866)
- Epiblema graphana (Treitschke, 1835)
- Epiblema hepaticana (Treitschke, 1835)
- Epiblema mendiculana (Treitschke, 1835)
- Epiblema scutulana (Denis & Schiffermüller, 1775)
- Epinotia brunnichana (Linnaeus, 1767)
- Epinotia dalmatana (Rebel, 1891)
- Epinotia festivana (Hübner, 1799)
- Epinotia fraternana (Haworth, 1811)
- Epinotia nigricana (Herrich-Schäffer, 1851)
- Epinotia nigristriana Budashkin & Zlatkov, 2011
- Epinotia nisella (Clerck, 1759)
- Epinotia subsequana (Haworth, 1811)
- Epinotia tedella (Clerck, 1759)
- Epinotia thapsiana (Zeller, 1847)
- Eucosma albidulana (Herrich-Schäffer, 1851)
- Eucosma campoliliana (Denis & Schiffermüller, 1775)
- Eucosma cana (Haworth, 1811)
- Eucosma conformana (Mann, 1872)
- Eucosma conterminana (Guenée, 1845)
- Eucosma cumulana (Guenée, 1845)
- Eucosma lugubrana (Treitschke, 1830)
- Eucosma obumbratana (Lienig & Zeller, 1846)
- Eudemis porphyrana (Hübner, 1799)
- Eugnosta lathoniana (Hübner, 1800)
- Eupoecilia cebrana (Hübner, 1813)
- Falseuncaria ruficiliana (Haworth, 1811)
- Grapholita funebrana Treitschke, 1835
- Grapholita janthinana (Duponchel, 1843)
- Grapholita molesta (Busck, 1916)
- Grapholita compositella (Fabricius, 1775)
- Grapholita coronillana Lienig & Zeller, 1846
- Grapholita delineana Walker, 1863
- Grapholita fissana (Frolich, 1828)
- Grapholita gemmiferana Treitschke, 1835
- Grapholita jungiella (Clerck, 1759)
- Grapholita nebritana Treitschke, 1830
- Grapholita orobana Treitschke, 1830
- Gravitarmata margarotana (Heinemann, 1863)
- Gynnidomorpha permixtana (Denis & Schiffermüller, 1775)
- Gypsonoma aceriana (Duponchel, 1843)
- Gypsonoma dealbana (Frolich, 1828)
- Gypsonoma minutana (Hübner, 1799)
- Gypsonoma sociana (Haworth, 1811)
- Hedya nubiferana (Haworth, 1811)
- Hedya pruniana (Hübner, 1799)
- Hedya salicella (Linnaeus, 1758)
- Hysterophora maculosana (Haworth, 1811)
- Isotrias hybridana (Hübner, 1817)
- Isotrias rectifasciana (Haworth, 1811)
- Lathronympha christenseni Aarvik & Karsholt, 1993
- Lathronympha strigana (Fabricius, 1775)
- Lobesia artemisiana (Zeller, 1847)
- Lobesia botrana (Denis & Schiffermüller, 1775)
- Lobesia confinitana (Staudinger, 1870)
- Neosphaleroptera nubilana (Hübner, 1799)
- Notocelia cynosbatella (Linnaeus, 1758)
- Notocelia incarnatana (Hübner, 1800)
- Notocelia roborana (Denis & Schiffermüller, 1775)
- Notocelia trimaculana (Haworth, 1811)
- Notocelia uddmanniana (Linnaeus, 1758)
- Olethreutes arcuella (Clerck, 1759)
- Oxypteron eremica (Walsingham, 1907)
- Pammene aurita Razowski, 1991
- Pammene christophana (Moschler, 1862)
- Pammene fasciana (Linnaeus, 1761)
- Pammene gallicolana (Lienig & Zeller, 1846)
- Pandemis cerasana (Hübner, 1786)
- Pandemis heparana (Denis & Schiffermüller, 1775)
- Paramesia gnomana (Clerck, 1759)
- Pelochrista agrestana (Treitschke, 1830)
- Pelochrista caecimaculana (Hübner, 1799)
- Pelochrista duercki (Osthelder, 1941)
- Pelochrista fusculana (Zeller, 1847)
- Pelochrista medullana (Staudinger, 1879)
- Phalonidia albipalpana (Zeller, 1847)
- Phalonidia contractana (Zeller, 1847)
- Phalonidia manniana (Fischer v. Röslerstamm, 1839)
- Phiaris stibiana (Guenée, 1845)
- Phtheochroa annae Huemer, 1990
- Phtheochroa duponchelana (Duponchel, 1843)
- Phtheochroa reisseri (Razowski, 1970)
- Phtheochroa sodaliana (Haworth, 1811)
- Prochlidonia amiantana (Hübner, 1799)
- Propiromorpha rhodophana (Herrich-Schäffer, 1851)
- Pseudargyrotoza conwagana (Fabricius, 1775)
- Pseudococcyx tessulatana (Staudinger, 1871)
- Ptycholoma lecheana (Linnaeus, 1758)
- Ptycholomoides aeriferana (Herrich-Schäffer, 1851)
- Rhyacionia buoliana (Denis & Schiffermüller, 1775)
- Selania capparidana (Zeller, 1847)
- Sparganothis pilleriana (Denis & Schiffermüller, 1775)
- Spilonota ocellana (Denis & Schiffermüller, 1775)
- Syndemis musculana (Hübner, 1799)
- Thiodia major (Rebel, 1903)
- Thiodia trochilana (Frolich, 1828)
- Tortrix viridana Linnaeus, 1758
- Xerocnephasia rigana (Sodoffsky, 1829)
- Zeiraphera rufimitrana (Herrich-Schäffer, 1851)

=== Yponomeutidae ===
- Cedestis gysseleniella Zeller, 1839
- Cedestis subfasciella (Stephens, 1834)
- Paradoxus osyridellus Stainton, 1869
- Paraswammerdamia albicapitella (Scharfenberg, 1805)
- Paraswammerdamia nebulella (Goeze, 1783)
- Scythropia crataegella (Linnaeus, 1767)
- Swammerdamia caesiella (Hübner, 1796)
- Swammerdamia compunctella Herrich-Schäffer, 1855
- Yponomeuta cagnagella (Hübner, 1813)
- Yponomeuta evonymella (Linnaeus, 1758)
- Yponomeuta malinellus Zeller, 1838
- Yponomeuta padella (Linnaeus, 1758)
- Yponomeuta plumbella (Denis & Schiffermüller, 1775)
- Yponomeuta rorrella (Hübner, 1796)
- Zelleria hepariella Stainton, 1849
- Zelleria oleastrella (Milliere, 1864)

=== Ypsolophidae ===
- Ochsenheimeria taurella (Denis & Schiffermüller, 1775)
- Ypsolopha albiramella (Mann, 1861)
- Ypsolopha dentella (Fabricius, 1775)
- Ypsolopha instabilella (Mann, 1866)
- Ypsolopha kristalleniae Rebel, 1916
- Ypsolopha lucella (Fabricius, 1775)
- Ypsolopha manniella (Staudinger, 1880)
- Ypsolopha minotaurella (Rebel, 1916)
- Ypsolopha parenthesella (Linnaeus, 1761)
- Ypsolopha persicella (Fabricius, 1787)
- Ypsolopha sculpturella (Herrich-Schäffer, 1854)
- Ypsolopha sylvella (Linnaeus, 1767)
- Ypsolopha trichonella (Mann, 1861)
- Ypsolopha ustella (Clerck, 1759)

=== Zygaenidae ===
- Adscita albanica (Naufock, 1926)
- Adscita capitalis (Staudinger, 1879)
- Adscita geryon (Hübner, 1813)
- Adscita obscura (Zeller, 1847)
- Adscita statices (Linnaeus, 1758)
- Adscita mannii (Lederer, 1853)
- Jordanita chloros (Hübner, 1813)
- Jordanita globulariae (Hübner, 1793)
- Jordanita graeca (Jordan, 1907)
- Jordanita subsolana (Staudinger, 1862)
- Jordanita budensis (Ad. & Au. Speyer, 1858)
- Jordanita notata (Zeller, 1847)
- Rhagades pruni (Denis & Schiffermüller, 1775)
- Rhagades amasina (Herrich-Schäffer, 1851)
- Theresimima ampellophaga (Bayle-Barelle, 1808)
- Zygaena carniolica (Scopoli, 1763)
- Zygaena sedi Fabricius, 1787
- Zygaena brizae (Esper, 1800)
- Zygaena laeta (Hübner, 1790)
- Zygaena minos (Denis & Schiffermüller, 1775)
- Zygaena punctum Ochsenheimer, 1808
- Zygaena purpuralis (Brunnich, 1763)
- Zygaena angelicae Ochsenheimer, 1808
- Zygaena ephialtes (Linnaeus, 1767)
- Zygaena filipendulae (Linnaeus, 1758)
- Zygaena lonicerae (Scheven, 1777)
- Zygaena loti (Denis & Schiffermüller, 1775)
- Zygaena nevadensis Rambur, 1858
- Zygaena viciae (Denis & Schiffermüller, 1775)
