= List of moths of Guinea =

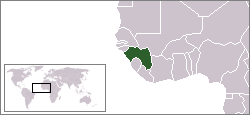
The location of Guinea.

There are about 175 known moth species of Guinea. The moths (mostly nocturnal) and butterflies (mostly diurnal) together make up the taxonomic order Lepidoptera.

This is a list of moth species which have been recorded in Guinea.

== Arctiidae ==
- Afrasura discreta Durante, 2009
- Afrasura hieroglyphica (Bethune-Baker, 1911)
- Afrasura pallescens Durante, 2009
- Afrowatsonius marginalis (Walker, 1855)
- Alpenus maculosa (Stoll, 1781)
- Alytarchia amanda (Boisduval, 1847)
- Amata alicia (Butler, 1876)
- Amata kuhlweini (Lefèbvre, 1832)
- Amerila vidua (Cramer, 1780)
- Amphicallia thelwalli (Druce, 1882)
- Anapisa holobrunnea Tams, 1932
- Anapisa monotonia Kiriakoff, 1963
- Argina amanda (Boisduval, 1847)
- Balacra caeruleifascia Walker, 1856
- Balacra flavimacula Walker, 1856
- Euchromia folletii Guérin-Méniville, 1832
- Metarctia maria Kiriakoff, 1957
- Ovenna guineacola (Strand, 1912)
- Ovenna vicaria (Walker, 1854)
- Phaegorista agaristiodes (Boisduval, 1836)
- Pseudothyretes rubicundula (Strand, 1912)
- Radiarctia lutescens (Walker, 1854)

== Autostichidae ==
- Aprominta australis Gozmány, 1966

== Bombycidae ==
- Vingerhoedtia ruficollis (Strand, 1910)

== Brahmaeidae ==
- Dactyloceras swanzii (Butler, 1871)

== Drepanidae ==
- Epicampoptera ivoirensis Watson, 1965
- Epicampoptera marantica (Tams, 1930)
- Epicampoptera strandi Bryk, 1913
- Spidia fenestrata Butler, 1878

== Elachistidae ==
- Exaeretia hermophila (Meyrick, 1922)

== Eupterotidae ==
- Acrojana sciron Druce, 1887
- Hibrildes norax Druce, 1887
- Jana eurymas Herrich-Schäffer, 1854

== Gelechiidae ==
- Brachmia circumfusa Meyrick, 1922

== Geometridae ==
- Archichlora viridimacula (Warren, 1898)
- Biston abruptaria (Walker, 1869)
- Biston antecreta (Prout, 1938)
- Biston johannaria (Oberthür, 1913)
- Biston subocularia (Mabille, 1893)
- Cabera limbata (Herbulot, 1954)
- Chiasmia umbrata (Warren, 1897)
- Chrysocraspeda rosina Warren, 1898
- Conolophia persimilis (Warren, 1905)
- Geodena melusine (Strand, 1909)
- Hypocoela turpisaria (Swinhoe, 1904)
- Idaea inquisita (Prout, 1932)
- Melinoessa aemonia (Swinhoe, 1904)
- Menophra dnophera (Prout, 1915)
- Scopula latitans Prout, 1920
- Zamarada acrochra Prout, 1928
- Zamarada adumbrata D. S. Fletcher, 1974
- Zamarada amymone Prout, 1934
- Zamarada bastelbergeri Gaede, 1915
- Zamarada bicuspida D. S. Fletcher, 1974
- Zamarada corroborata Herbulot, 1954
- Zamarada cucharita D. S. Fletcher, 1974
- Zamarada cydippe Herbulot, 1954
- Zamarada dentigera Warren, 1909
- Zamarada dilucida Warren, 1909
- Zamarada dolorosa D. S. Fletcher, 1974
- Zamarada dyscapna D. S. Fletcher, 1974
- Zamarada emaciata D. S. Fletcher, 1974
- Zamarada eucharis (Drury, 1782)
- Zamarada euphrosyne Oberthür, 1912
- Zamarada excavata Bethune-Baker, 1913
- Zamarada ilaria Swinhoe, 1904
- Zamarada indicata D. S. Fletcher, 1974
- Zamarada ixiaria Swinhoe, 1904
- Zamarada labifera Prout, 1915
- Zamarada melanopyga Herbulot, 1954
- Zamarada melpomene Oberthür, 1912
- Zamarada mimesis D. S. Fletcher, 1974
- Zamarada nasuta Warren, 1897
- Zamarada paxilla D. S. Fletcher, 1974
- Zamarada perlepidata (Walker, 1863)
- Zamarada plana Basterberger, 1909
- Zamarada protrusa Warren, 1897
- Zamarada reflexaria (Walker, 1863)
- Zamarada regularis D. S. Fletcher, 1974
- Zamarada vigilans Prout, 1915
- Zamarada vulpina Warren, 1897

== Himantopteridae ==
- Doratopteryx dissemurus Kiriakoff, 1963

== Lasiocampidae ==
- Euphorea ondulosa (Conte, 1909)
- Gonometa nysa Druce, 1887
- Mimopacha gerstaeckerii (Dewitz, 1881)
- Odontocheilopteryx haribda Gurkovich & Zolotuhin, 2009
- Pallastica lateritia (Hering, 1928)
- Sophyrita argibasis (Mabille, 1893)

== Limacodidae ==
- Parasa divisa West, 1940

== Lymantriidae ==
- Bracharoa mixta (Snellen, 1872)
- Crorema ochracea (Snellen, 1872)
- Euproctis molunduana Aurivillius, 1925
- Laelia subrosea (Walker, 1855)
- Opoboa chrysoparala Collenette, 1932
- Otroeda hesperia (Cramer, 1779)

== Metarbelidae ==
- Metarbela onusta Karsch, 1896
- Moyencharia sommerlattei Lehmann, 2013

== Noctuidae ==
- Abrostola confusa Dufay, 1958
- Achaea lienardi Boisduval, 1833
- Acontia citrelinea Bethune-Baker, 1911
- Acontia imitatrix Wallengren, 1856
- Acontia insocia (Walker, 1857)
- Aegocera rectilinea Boisduval, 1836
- Aegocera tigrina (Druce, 1882)
- Andrhippuris caudaequina Karsch, 1895
- Asota speciosa (Drury, 1773)
- Chaetostephana inclusa (Karsch, 1895)
- Cyligramma latona (Cramer, 1775)
- Cyligramma limacina (Guérin-Méneville, 1832)
- Dysgonia pudica (Möschler, 1887)
- Dysgonia torrida (Guenée, 1852)
- Eudocima divitiosa (Walker, 1869)
- Eudocima materna (Linnaeus, 1767)
- Feliniopsis africana (Schaus & Clements, 1893)
- Feliniopsis nigribarbata (Hampson, 1908)
- Fodina albicincta (Walker, 1869)
- Godasa sidae (Fabricius, 1793)
- Heliophisma klugii (Boisduval, 1833)
- Heraclia geryon (Fabricius, 1781)
- Heraclia poggei (Dewitz, 1879)
- Hespagarista caudata (Dewitz, 1879)
- Hypena obacerralis Walker, [1859]
- Marcipa aequatorialis Pelletier, 1975
- Masalia flavistrigata (Hampson, 1903)
- Masalia nubila (Hampson, 1903)
- Masalia rubristria (Hampson, 1903)
- Miniodes discolor Guenée, 1852
- Ophiusa conspicienda Walker, 1858
- Parachalciope binaria Holland, 1894
- Parachalciope euclidicola Walker, 1858
- Phaegorista agaristoides Boisduval, 1836
- Spodoptera exempta (Walker, 1857)
- Thiacidas meii Hacker & Zilli, 2007
- Thiacidas mukim (Berio, 1977)
- Thiacidas submutata Hacker & Zilli, 2007
- Timora perrosea de Joannis, 1910

== Nolidae ==
- Arcyophora zanderi Felder & Rogenhofer, 1874
- Leucophanera argyrozona de Joannis, 1911

== Notodontidae ==
- Andocidia tabernaria Kiriakoff, 1958
- Chlorochadisra viridipulverea (Gaede, 1928)
- Desmeocraera roseoviridis Kiriakoff, 1958
- Desmeocraera varia (Walker, 1855)
- Stauropussa chloe (Holland, 1893)
- Ulinella royi Kiriakoff, 1963

== Psychidae ==
- Eumeta cervina Druce, 1887
- Narycia epibyrsa Meyrick, 1922

== Pterophoridae ==
- Buckleria girardi Gibeaux, 1992
- Megalorhipida tessmanni (Strand, 1913)
- Pterophorus lamottei Gibeaux, 1992
- Pterophorus legrandi Gibeaux, 1992
- Sphenarches anisodactylus (Walker, 1864)

== Pyralidae ==
- Acracona lamottei (Marion, 1954)

== Saturniidae ==
- Aurivillius triramis (Rothschild, 1907)
- Campimoptilum kuntzei (Dewitz, 1881)
- Decachorda aspersa (Felder, 1874)
- Epiphora albidus (Druce, 1886)
- Epiphora boolana Strand, 1909
- Epiphora getula (Maassen & Weymer, 1885)
- Epiphora magdalena Grünberg, 1909
- Epiphora ploetzi (Weymer, 1880)
- Epiphora vacuna (Westwood, 1849)
- Eudaemonia trogophylla Hampson, 1919
- Gonimbrasia hecate Rougeot, 1955
- Lobobunaea acetes (Westwood, 1849)
- Nudaurelia alopia Westwood, 1849
- Nudaurelia dione (Fabricius, 1793)
- Nudaurelia emini (Butler, 1888)
- Orthogonioptilum nimbaense Rougeot, 1962
- Orthogonioptilum prox Karsch, 1892
- Rohaniella pygmaea (Maassen & Weymer, 1885)

== Sphingidae ==
- Acherontia atropos (Linnaeus, 1758)
- Euchloron megaera (Linnaeus, 1758)
- Neopolyptychus ancylus (Rothschild & Jordan, 1916)
- Neopolyptychus consimilis (Rothschild & Jordan, 1903)
- Nephele comma Hopffer, 1857
- Phylloxiphia bicolor (Rothschild, 1894)
- Phylloxiphia goodii (Holland, 1889)
- Phylloxiphia illustris (Rothschild & Jordan, 1906)
- Phylloxiphia oberthueri (Rothschild & Jordan, 1903)
- Polyptychus carteri (Butler, 1882)
- Pseudenyo benitensis Holland, 1889
- Pseudoclanis occidentalis Rothschild & Jordan, 1903
- Sphingonaepiopsis nana (Walker, 1856)
- Temnora nephele Clark, 1922
- Theretra perkeo Rothschild & Jordan, 1903

== Thyrididae ==
- Arniocera collenettei Talbot, 1929

== Tineidae ==
- Cimitra fetialis (Meyrick, 1917)
- Criticonoma gypsocoma (Meyrick, 1931)
- Histiovalva fortunata Gozmány, 1965
- Hyperbola pastoralis (Meyrick, 1931)
- Monopis addenda Gozmány, 1965
- Syncalipsis optania (Meyrick, 1908)

== Tortricidae ==
- Cydia improbana (Snellen, 1872)
- Sanguinograptis albardana (Snellen, 1872)

== See also ==
- List of butterflies of Guinea

General:

- Wildlife of Guinea
