= Scopula benenotata =

Scientific classification
- Kingdom: Animalia
- Phylum: Arthropoda
- Class: Insecta
- Order: Lepidoptera
- Family: Geometridae
- Genus: Scopula
- Species: S. benenotata

Binomial name
- Scopula benenotata Prout, 1932

Species of geometer moth in subfamily Sterrhinae

Scopula benenotata is a moth of the family Geometridae. It was described by Prout in 1932. It is endemic to Madagascar.

This species is similar to Scopula latitans Prout, 1920 in structure. The forewings are a little narrower with more oblique termen, the colouring is warmer – a pinkish buff or light pinkish cinnamon, and it has larger cell-dots. The male of this species has a wingspan of 26 millimetres (1.0 in).
