= Afrasura numida =

Scientific classification
- Kingdom: Animalia
- Phylum: Arthropoda
- Class: Insecta
- Order: Lepidoptera
- Superfamily: Noctuoidea
- Family: Erebidae
- Subfamily: Arctiinae
- Genus: Afrasura
- Species: A. numida

Binomial name
- Afrasura numida (Holland, 1893)

Synonyms
- Miltochrista numida Holland, 1893; Asura numida

Species of moth

Afrasura numida is a moth of the subfamily Arctiinae first described by William Jacob Holland in 1893. It is found in Cameroon, the Democratic Republic of the Congo, Gabon, Ghana and Nigeria.
