= Afrasura emma =

Scientific classification
- Domain: Eukaryota
- Kingdom: Animalia
- Phylum: Arthropoda
- Class: Insecta
- Order: Lepidoptera
- Superfamily: Noctuoidea
- Family: Erebidae
- Subfamily: Arctiinae
- Genus: Afrasura
- Species: A. emma

Binomial name
- Afrasura emma Durante, 2009

Species of moth

Afrasura emma is a moth of the subfamily Arctiinae that can be found in Gabon and Nigeria.
