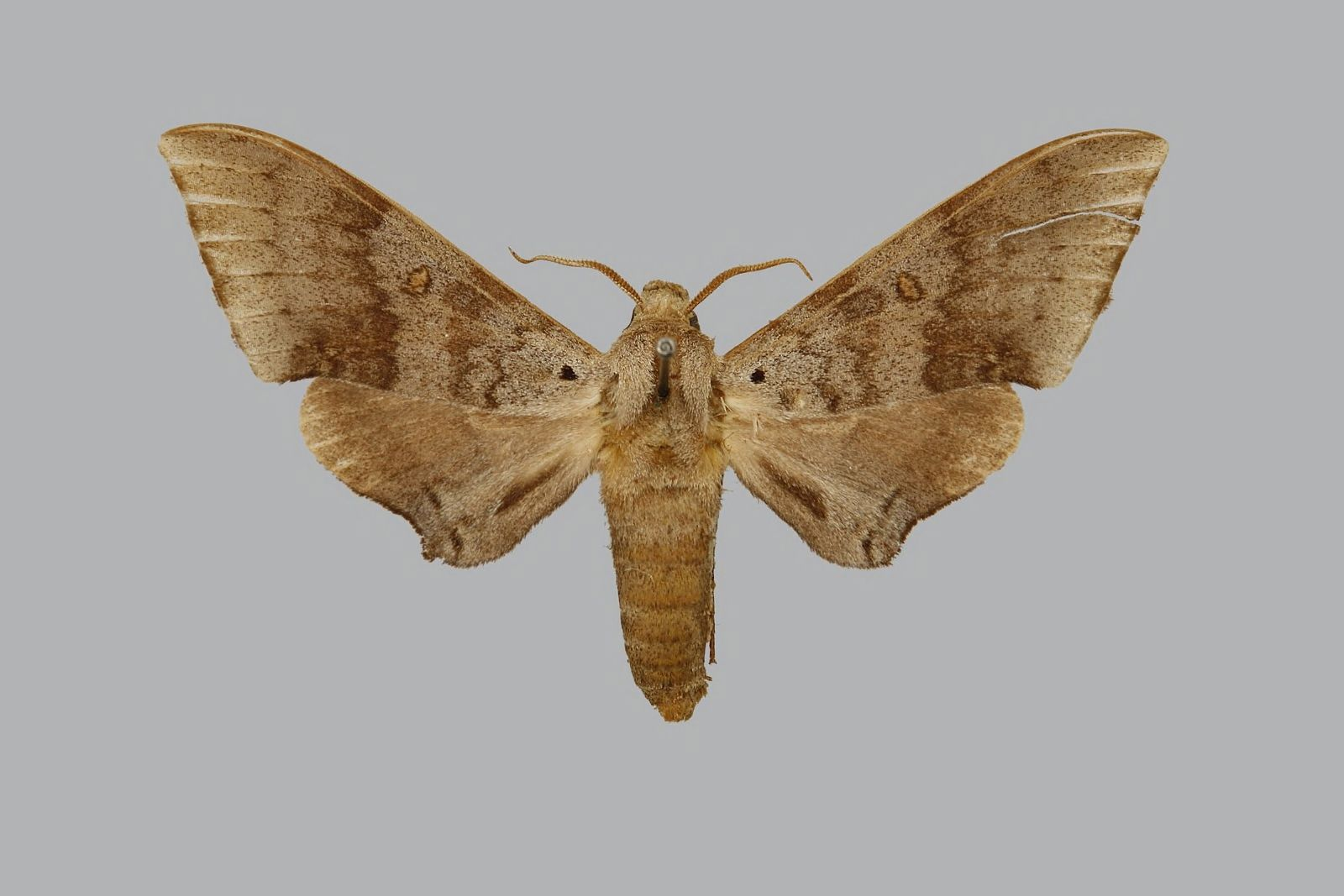

Scientific classification
- Kingdom: Animalia
- Phylum: Arthropoda
- Clade: Pancrustacea
- Class: Insecta
- Order: Lepidoptera
- Family: Sphingidae
- Genus: Neopolyptychus
- Species: N. prionites

Binomial name
- Neopolyptychus prionites (Rothschild & Jordan, 1916)

Synonyms
- Polyptychus prionites Rothschild & Jordan, 1916; Polyptychus roseola Clark, 1917

= Neopolyptychus prionites =

Species of moth

Neopolyptychus prionites is a moth of the family Sphingidae. It is known from lowland forests and heavy woodland from Guinea to the Congo and western Uganda.
