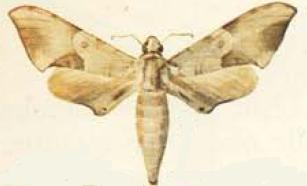

Scientific classification
- Kingdom: Animalia
- Phylum: Arthropoda
- Class: Insecta
- Order: Lepidoptera
- Family: Sphingidae
- Genus: Neopolyptychus
- Species: N. compar

Binomial name
- Neopolyptychus compar (Rothschild & Jordan, 1903)

Synonyms
- Polyptychus compar Rothschild & Jordan, 1903

= Neopolyptychus compar =

Species of moth

Neopolyptychus compar is a moth of the family Sphingidae. It is known from Brachystegia woodland from Zimbabwe to Mozambique, Zambia, Malawi and south-eastern Tanzania.

The wingspan is 64–83 mm (2.5–3.3 in).

The larvae feed on the leaves of Brachystegia spicaeformis.

== Subspecies ==
- Neopolyptychus compar compar (Zimbabwe to Mozambique, Zambia, Malawi and south-eastern Tanzania)
- Neopolyptychus compar septentrionalis Carcasson, 1968 (coastal areas of Kenya and northern Tanzania)
