= Afrasura amaniensis =

Scientific classification
- Kingdom: Animalia
- Phylum: Arthropoda
- Class: Insecta
- Order: Lepidoptera
- Superfamily: Noctuoidea
- Family: Erebidae
- Subfamily: Arctiinae
- Genus: Afrasura
- Species: A. amaniensis

Binomial name
- Afrasura amaniensis (Cieślak & Häuser, 2006)

Synonyms
- Asura amaniensis Cieslak & Häuser, 2006

Species of moth

Afrasura amaniensis is a moth of the subfamily Arctiinae which is endemic to Tanzania.
