= Afrowatsonius burgeoni =

Scientific classification
- Kingdom: Animalia
- Phylum: Arthropoda
- Clade: Pancrustacea
- Class: Insecta
- Order: Lepidoptera
- Superfamily: Noctuoidea
- Family: Erebidae
- Subfamily: Arctiinae
- Genus: Afrowatsonius
- Species: A. burgeoni

Binomial name
- Afrowatsonius burgeoni (Talbot, 1928)

Synonyms
- Pericallia burgeoni Talbot, 1928

Species of moth

Afrowatsonius burgeoni is a moth of the family Erebidae. It is found in the Democratic Republic of Congo.
