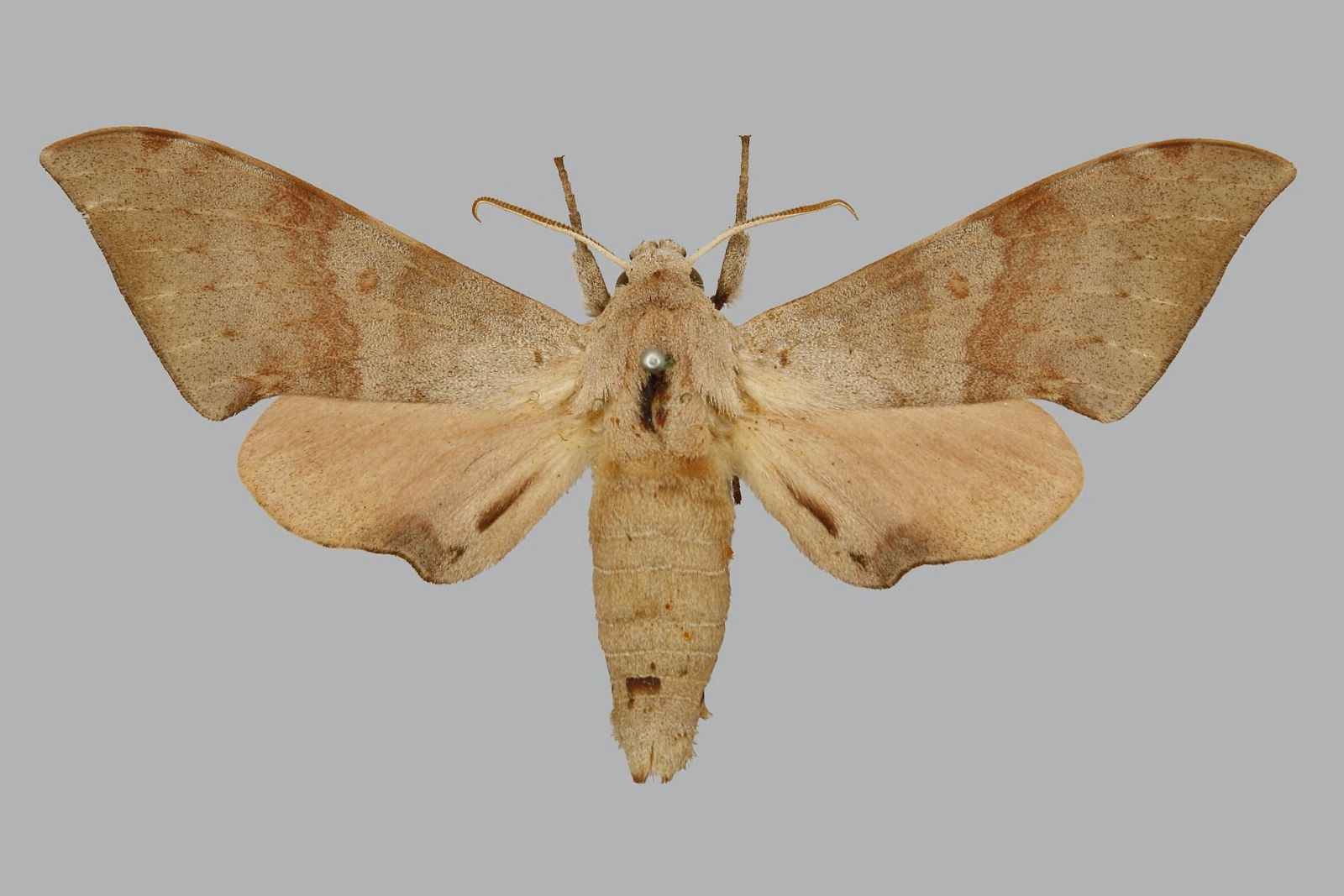
- Neopolyptychus convexus (male)

Scientific classification
- Kingdom: Animalia
- Phylum: Arthropoda
- Class: Insecta
- Order: Lepidoptera
- Family: Sphingidae
- Genus: Neopolyptychus
- Species: N. convexus

Binomial name
- Neopolyptychus convexus (Rothschild & Jordan, 1903)

Synonyms
- Polyptychus pygarga convexus Rothschild & Jordan, 1903; Polyptychus springerae Clark, 1936

= Neopolyptychus convexus =

Species of moth

Neopolyptychus convexus is a moth of the family Sphingidae. It is known from Brachystegia woodland in the Democratic Republic of the Congo, Zambia and western Tanzania.

The forewing is 28–34 mm for males and 34–44 mm for females.
