= Aprominta syriacella =

Scientific classification
- Domain: Eukaryota
- Kingdom: Animalia
- Phylum: Arthropoda
- Class: Insecta
- Order: Lepidoptera
- Family: Autostichidae
- Genus: Aprominta
- Species: A. syriacella

Binomial name
- Aprominta syriacella (Ragonot, 1895)

Synonyms
- Symmoca syriacella Ragonot, 1895

Species of moth

Aprominta syriacella is a moth in the family Autostichidae. It was described by Émile Louis Ragonot in 1895. It is found in Syria and Turkey (the Taurus Mountains).
