= Afrasura crenulata =

Scientific classification
- Kingdom: Animalia
- Phylum: Arthropoda
- Class: Insecta
- Order: Lepidoptera
- Superfamily: Noctuoidea
- Family: Erebidae
- Subfamily: Arctiinae
- Genus: Afrasura
- Species: A. crenulata

Binomial name
- Afrasura crenulata (Bethune-Baker, 1911)

Synonyms
- Asura crenulata Bethune-Baker, 1911

Species of moth

Afrasura crenulata is a moth of the subfamily Arctiinae. It is found in Angola.
