= Afrasura neavi =

Scientific classification
- Kingdom: Animalia
- Phylum: Arthropoda
- Class: Insecta
- Order: Lepidoptera
- Superfamily: Noctuoidea
- Family: Erebidae
- Subfamily: Arctiinae
- Genus: Afrasura
- Species: A. neavi

Binomial name
- Afrasura neavi (Hampson, 1914)

Synonyms
- Asura neavi Hampson, 1914

Species of moth

Afrasura neavi is a moth of the subfamily Arctiinae first described by George Hampson in 1914. It is found in Tanzania and Uganda.
