= Aprominta yatagan =

Scientific classification
- Kingdom: Animalia
- Phylum: Arthropoda
- Clade: Pancrustacea
- Class: Insecta
- Order: Lepidoptera
- Family: Autostichidae
- Genus: Aprominta
- Species: A. yatagan

Binomial name
- Aprominta yatagan Gozmány, 2008

Species of moth

Aprominta yatagan is a moth in the family Autostichidae. It was described by László Anthony Gozmány in 2008. It is found in Asia Minor.
