= Aprominta pannosella =

Scientific classification
- Domain: Eukaryota
- Kingdom: Animalia
- Phylum: Arthropoda
- Class: Insecta
- Order: Lepidoptera
- Family: Autostichidae
- Genus: Aprominta
- Species: A. pannosella

Binomial name
- Aprominta pannosella (Rebel, 1906)

Synonyms
- Symmoca pannosella Rebel, 1906

Species of moth

Aprominta pannosella is a moth of the family Autostichidae. It is found in Greece.

The wingspan is 15–17 mm. The ground colour of the forewings is dull whitish, sprinkled with black scales.
