= Aprominta atricanella =

Scientific classification
- Domain: Eukaryota
- Kingdom: Animalia
- Phylum: Arthropoda
- Class: Insecta
- Order: Lepidoptera
- Family: Autostichidae
- Genus: Aprominta
- Species: A. atricanella

Binomial name
- Aprominta atricanella (Rebel, 1906)

Synonyms
- Symmoca atricanella Rebel, 1906

Species of moth

Aprominta atricanella is a moth of the family Autostichidae. It is found in Bulgaria, North Macedonia and Greece.

The wingspan is about 16 mm. The ground colour of the forewings is whitish sprinkled with large, blackish grey scales. The hindwings are dark grey.
