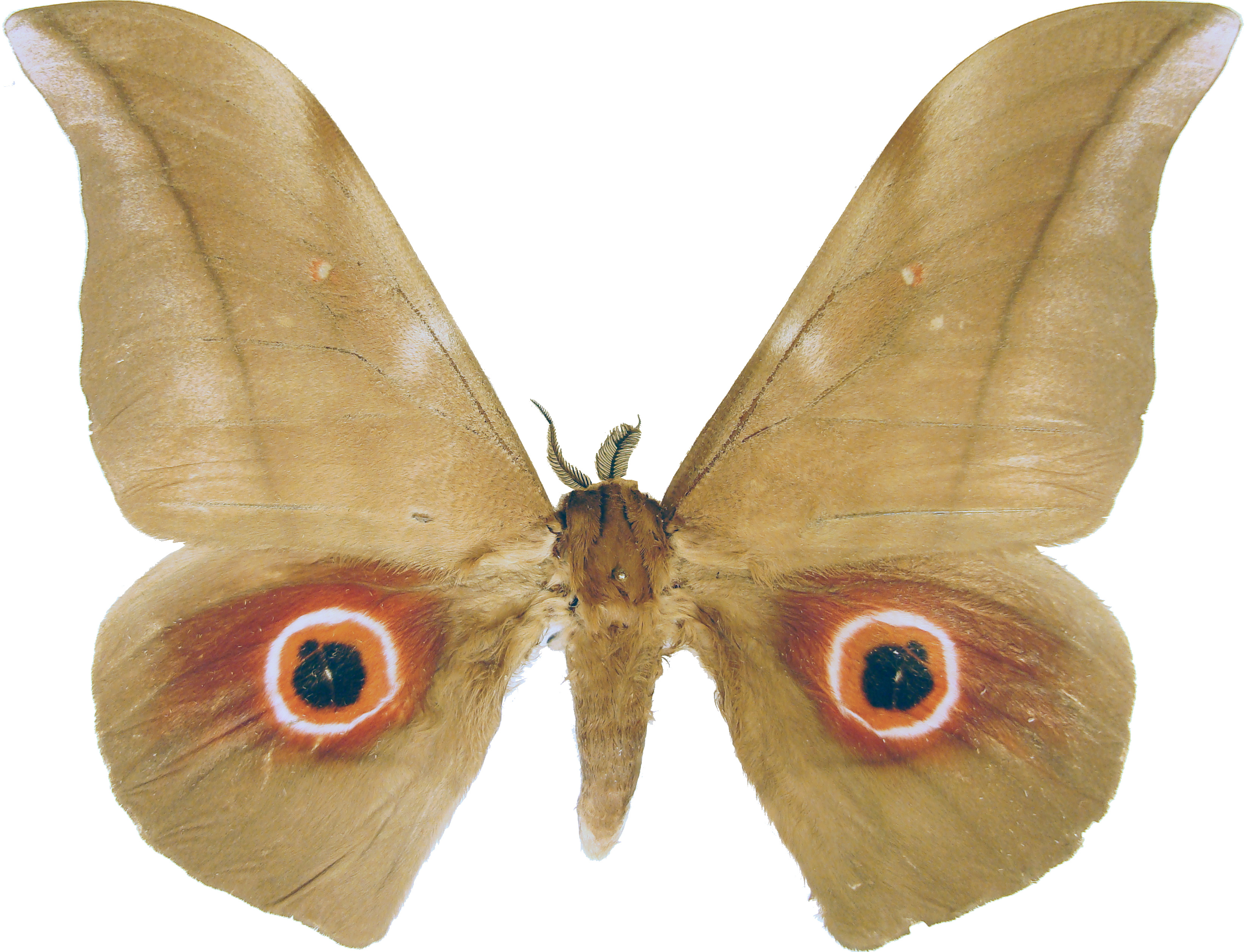
- Lobobunaea phaetusa from Cameroon

Scientific classification
- Kingdom: Animalia
- Phylum: Arthropoda
- Clade: Pancrustacea
- Class: Insecta
- Order: Lepidoptera
- Family: Saturniidae
- Genus: Lobobunaea
- Species: L. phaedusa

Binomial name
- Lobobunaea phaedusa (Drury, 1782)

Synonyms
- Phalaena phaedusa Drury, 1782; Lobobunaea elegans Bouvier, 1928; Antheraea laestrygon Mabille, 1878; Lobonuaea laurae Strand, 1912; Bunaea thomsonii Kirby, 1877; Lobobunaea phaeax Jordan, 1910; Lobobunaea christyi molleti Darge, 1975; Lobobunaea phaedusa flammulata Navatte, 1879; Bunea christyi Sharpe, 1889; Lobobunaea falcatissima Rougeot, 1962

= Lobobunaea phaedusa =

Species of moth

Lobobunaea phaedusa is a species of very large moths in the family Saturniidae. It is found in much of sub-saharan Africa, where its host plants include African custard-apple (Annona senegalensis), crown-berry (Crossopteryx febrifuga), and Aframomum spp.

== Description ==
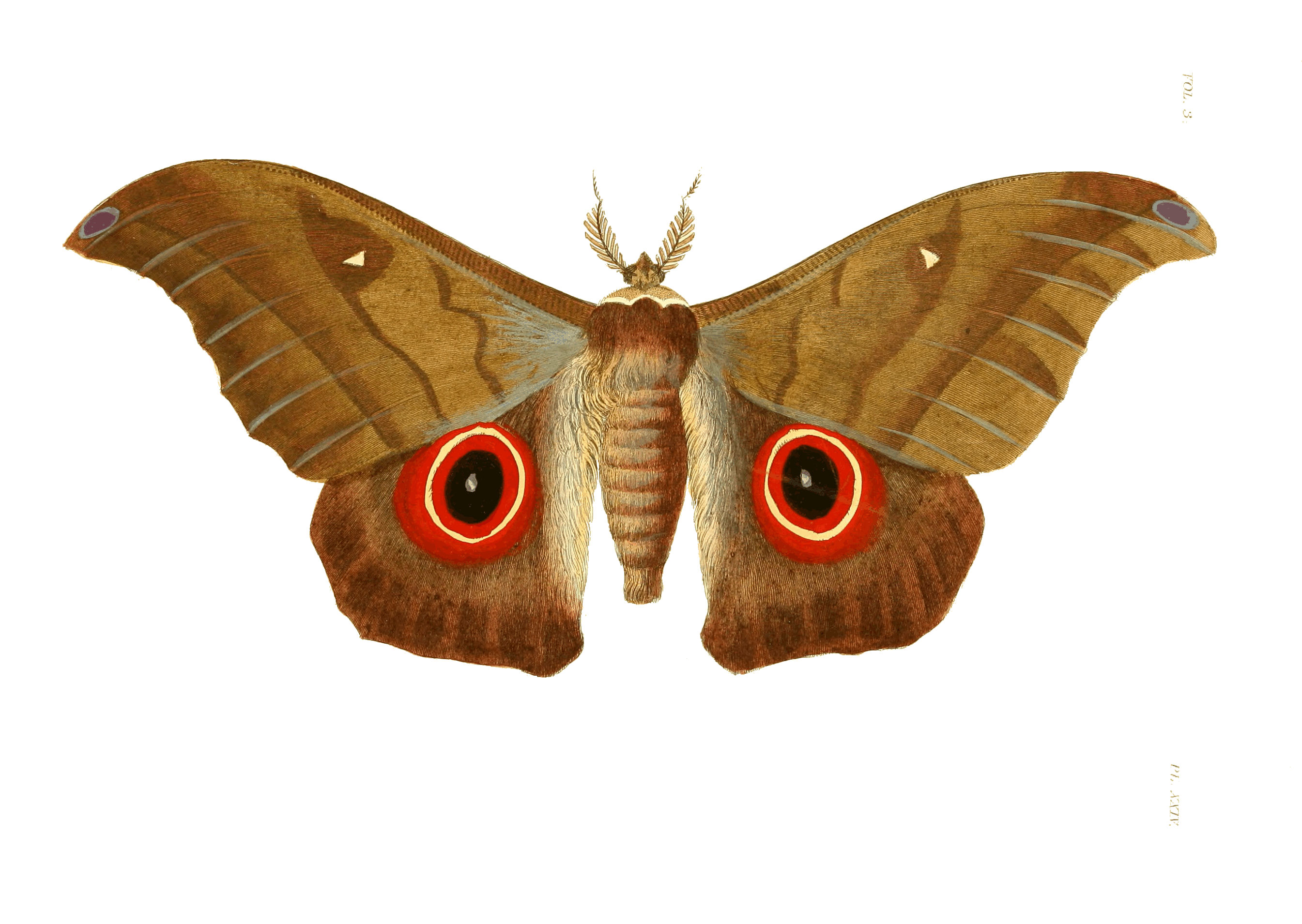

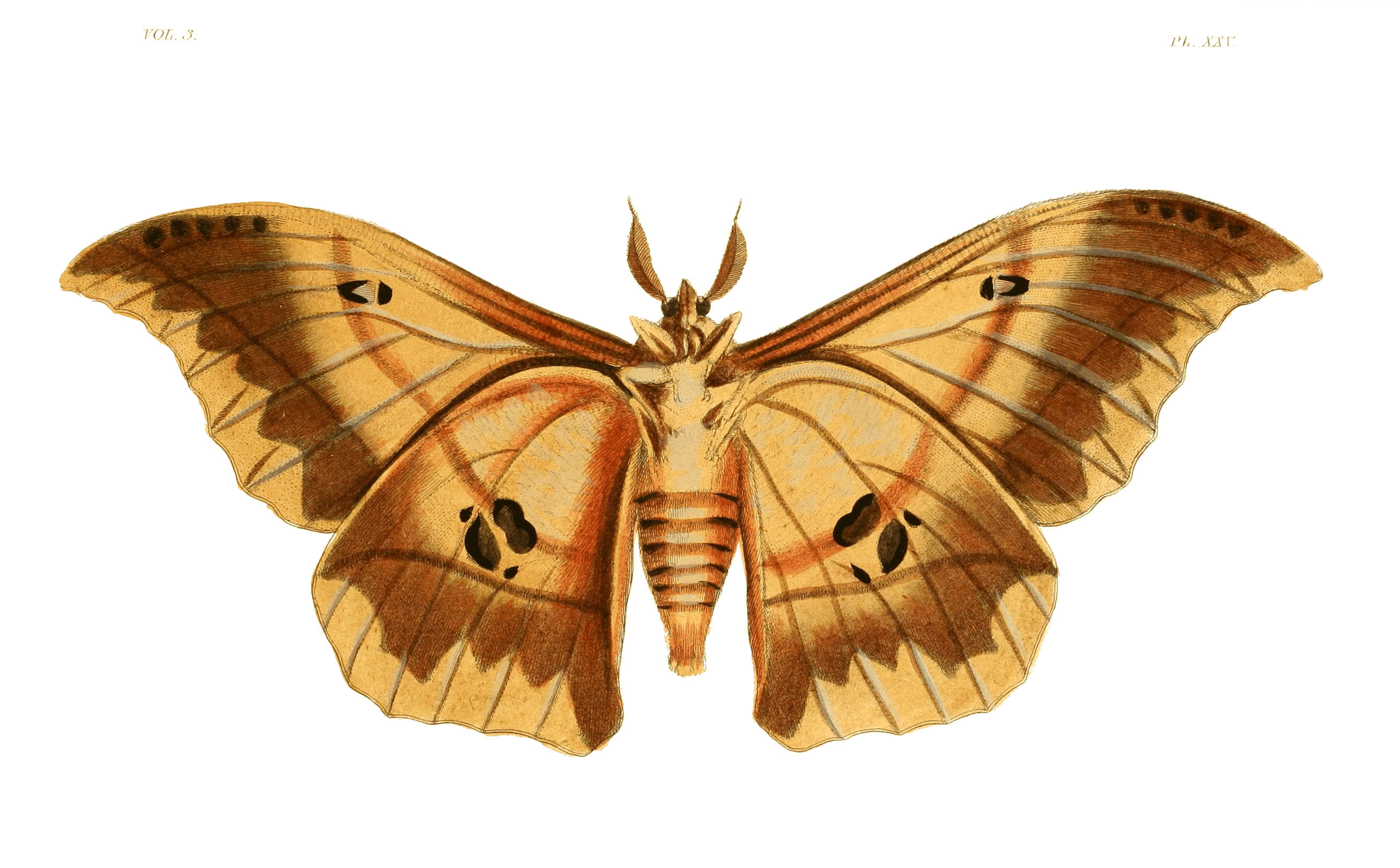
Illustration by Dru Drury

=== Dorsal surface ===
Antennae broad in the middle and strongly pectinated, terminating in a point both at the base and extremity, the latter being like a thread. Head dark brown. The neck surrounded with a white collar. Thorax and abdomen greyish clay-coloured. Anterior wings the same, but towards their extremities becoming darker; the tips are angulated, and the edges a little scolloped; a dark line rises near the tips, which running across the wings ends near the middle of the posterior edges, but is there much fainter than at the tips. A small triangular transparent spot is situate near the centre of these wings, about three-eighths of an inch from the anterior edges. Posterior wings a little scolloped, being the same colour with the anterior next the abdomen, but darker towards the external edges. In the middle of these wings is a large eye, the pupil being black like velvet, surrounded with a narrow circle of a dark orange, round which is another cream-coloured circle, and this likewise is surrounded by a large border of a fine red-brown.

=== Ventral surface ===
Thighs of the fore legs dark brown, the other legs lighter. Breast and abdomen light clay-coloured. Anterior wings the same, being next the body paler than towards the extremities; along the external edges is a pale indented border, running from the tips to the lower corners. Two dark brown spots are placed next the transparent one mentioned in the preceding description, and the dark line there mentioned is conspicuous on this side. Posterior wings coloured as the anterior, becoming darker towards the external edges. A pale indented border runs along the external edges, similar to that on the anterior wings. On the middle of these wings are four dark brown spots, two small and two large, being placed opposite to the eyes observed on the upper side; and just below them a dark line runs across from the upper corners to the middle of the abdominal edges. Wing-span 7¾ inches (195 mm).

== Subspecies ==
- Lobobunaea phaedusa phaedusa
- Lobobunaea phaedusa christyi (Sharpe, 1889) (Cameroon, Eritrea, Ethiopia, Ghana, Kenya, Niger, Nigeria, Senegal, Somalia, Sudan, Tanzania, Togo)
- Lobobunaea phaedusa falcatissima Rougeot, 1962 (Democratic Republic of Congo, South Africa, Tanzania, Zambia)
- Lobobunaea phaedusa rexnoctuae Stoneham, 1962 (Tanzania)
