= Afrasura submarmorata =

Scientific classification
- Kingdom: Animalia
- Phylum: Arthropoda
- Class: Insecta
- Order: Lepidoptera
- Superfamily: Noctuoidea
- Family: Erebidae
- Subfamily: Arctiinae
- Genus: Afrasura
- Species: A. submarmorata

Binomial name
- Afrasura submarmorata (Kiriakoff, 1958)

Synonyms
- Asura submarmorata Kiriakoff, 1958

Species of moth

Afrasura submarmorata is a moth of the subfamily Arctiinae first described by Sergius G. Kiriakoff in 1958. It is found in Uganda.
