= Aprominta argonauta =

Scientific classification
- Kingdom: Animalia
- Phylum: Arthropoda
- Clade: Pancrustacea
- Class: Insecta
- Order: Lepidoptera
- Family: Autostichidae
- Genus: Aprominta
- Species: A. argonauta

Binomial name
- Aprominta argonauta Gozmány, 1964

Species of moth

Aprominta argonauta is a moth of the family Autostichidae. It is found on Crete.
