= Afrowatsonius sudanicus =

Scientific classification
- Domain: Eukaryota
- Kingdom: Animalia
- Phylum: Arthropoda
- Class: Insecta
- Order: Lepidoptera
- Superfamily: Noctuoidea
- Family: Erebidae
- Subfamily: Arctiinae
- Genus: Afrowatsonius
- Species: A. sudanicus

Binomial name
- Afrowatsonius sudanicus (Rothschild, 1933)

Synonyms
- Creatonotos sudanicus Rothschild, 1933

Species of insect

Afrowatsonius sudanicus is a moth of the family Erebidae. It is found in Sudan.
