= Afrowatsonius fulvomarginalis =

Scientific classification
- Domain: Eukaryota
- Kingdom: Animalia
- Phylum: Arthropoda
- Class: Insecta
- Order: Lepidoptera
- Superfamily: Noctuoidea
- Family: Erebidae
- Subfamily: Arctiinae
- Genus: Afrowatsonius
- Species: A. fulvomarginalis

Binomial name
- Afrowatsonius fulvomarginalis (Wichgraf, 1921)

Synonyms
- Creatonotus fulvomarginalis Wichgraf, 1921

Species of moth

Afrowatsonius fulvomarginalis is a moth of the family Erebidae. It is found in Sudan.
