= Acracona =

Scientific classification
- Domain: Eukaryota
- Kingdom: Animalia
- Phylum: Arthropoda
- Class: Insecta
- Order: Lepidoptera
- Family: Pyralidae
- Subfamily: Galleriinae
- Tribe: Tirathabini
- Genus: Acracona; Karsch, 1900

Synonyms
- Munroeia Marion, 1954; Thermauge Hampson, 1906

Genus of moths

Acracona is a genus of snout moths in the subfamily Galleriinae. It was described by Ferdinand Karsch in 1900, and is known from Uganda, French Guinea, Togo and Madagascar.

== Species ==
- Acracona elgonae Whalley, 1964
- Acracona lamottei (Marion, 1954)
- Acracona pratti (Kenrick, 1917)
- Acracona remipedalis Karsch, 1900
