= Aprominta aperitta =

Scientific classification
- Kingdom: Animalia
- Phylum: Arthropoda
- Clade: Pancrustacea
- Class: Insecta
- Order: Lepidoptera
- Family: Autostichidae
- Genus: Aprominta
- Species: A. aperitta

Binomial name
- Aprominta aperitta Gozmány, 1997

Species of moth

Aprominta aperitta is a moth of the family Autostichidae. It is found on the Aegean Islands.
