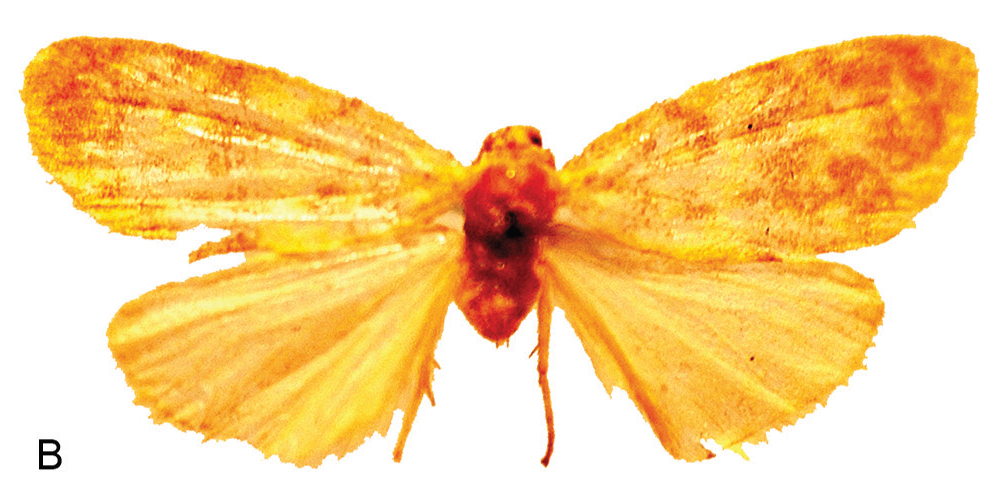
- Afrasura ichorina

Scientific classification
- Kingdom: Animalia
- Phylum: Arthropoda
- Class: Insecta
- Order: Lepidoptera
- Superfamily: Noctuoidea
- Family: Erebidae
- Subfamily: Arctiinae
- Subtribe: Nudariina
- Genus: Afrasura; Durante, 2009

Type species
- Barsine indecisa Walker, 1869

= Afrasura =

Genus of moths

Afrasura is a genus of moths in the subfamily Arctiinae from the Afrotropics.

== Species ==
- Afrasura aetheria Durante, 2012
- Afrasura amaniensis (Cieslak & Häuser, 2006)
- Afrasura camilla Durante, 2012
- Afrasura clara (Holland, 1893)
- Afrasura crenulata (Bethune-Baker, 1911)
- Afrasura discocellularis (Strand, 1912)
- Afrasura discreta Durante, 2009
- Afrasura dubitabilis Durante, 2009
- Afrasura duplex Durante, 2012
- Afrasura emma Durante, 2009
- Afrasura fracta Durante, 2012
- Afrasura hieroglyphica (Bethune-Baker, 1911)
- Afrasura hyporhoda (Hampson, 1900)
- Afrasura ichorina (Butler, 1877)
- Afrasura indecisa (Walker, 1869)
- Afrasura neavi (Hampson, 1914)
- Afrasura numida (Holland, 1893)
- Afrasura obliterata (Walker, 1864)
- Afrasura pallescens Durante, 2009
- Afrasura peripherica (Strand, 1912)
- Afrasura rivulosa (Walker, 1854)
- Afrasura submarmorata (Kiriakoff, 1958)
- Afrasura terlinea Durante, 2009
- Afrasura trunca Durante, 2012
- Afrasura violacea (Cieslak & Häuser, 2006)
