= Aprominta bifasciata =

Scientific classification
- Domain: Eukaryota
- Kingdom: Animalia
- Phylum: Arthropoda
- Class: Insecta
- Order: Lepidoptera
- Family: Autostichidae
- Genus: Aprominta
- Species: A. bifasciata

Binomial name
- Aprominta bifasciata (Staudinger, 1870)

Synonyms
- Symmoca bifasciata Staudinger, 1870; Symmoca virginella Rebel, 1902

Species of moth

Aprominta bifasciata is a moth in the family Autostichidae. It is found in Greece and Turkey.
