= Aprominta africana =

Scientific classification
- Kingdom: Animalia
- Phylum: Arthropoda
- Clade: Pancrustacea
- Class: Insecta
- Order: Lepidoptera
- Family: Autostichidae
- Genus: Aprominta
- Species: A. africana

Binomial name
- Aprominta africana Gozmány, 1961

Species of moth

Aprominta africana is a moth in the family Autostichidae. It was described by László Anthony Gozmány in 1961. It is found in Morocco.
