= Aprominta designatella =

Scientific classification
- Domain: Eukaryota
- Kingdom: Animalia
- Phylum: Arthropoda
- Class: Insecta
- Order: Lepidoptera
- Family: Autostichidae
- Genus: Aprominta
- Species: A. designatella

Binomial name
- Aprominta designatella (Herrich-Schäffer, 1855)

Synonyms
- Symmoca designatella Herrich-Schäffer, 1855

Species of moth

Aprominta designatella is a moth of the family Autostichidae. It is found in Albania, Bosnia and Herzegovina, Croatia, Serbia, Bulgaria, Romania, North Macedonia, Greece, Russia and Turkey.
