= Aprominta xena =

Scientific classification
- Kingdom: Animalia
- Phylum: Arthropoda
- Clade: Pancrustacea
- Class: Insecta
- Order: Lepidoptera
- Family: Autostichidae
- Genus: Aprominta
- Species: A. xena

Binomial name
- Aprominta xena Gozmány, 1959

Species of moth

Aprominta xena is a moth of the family Autostichidae. It is found on Crete.
