= Aprominta afrogypsa =

Scientific classification
- Kingdom: Animalia
- Phylum: Arthropoda
- Clade: Pancrustacea
- Class: Insecta
- Order: Lepidoptera
- Family: Autostichidae
- Genus: Aprominta
- Species: A. afrogypsa

Binomial name
- Aprominta afrogypsa Gozmány, 1988

Species of moth

Aprominta afrogypsa is a moth in the family Autostichidae. It was described by László Anthony Gozmány in 1988. It is found in Morocco.
