= Afrasura peripherica =

Scientific classification
- Kingdom: Animalia
- Phylum: Arthropoda
- Class: Insecta
- Order: Lepidoptera
- Superfamily: Noctuoidea
- Family: Erebidae
- Subfamily: Arctiinae
- Genus: Afrasura
- Species: A. peripherica

Binomial name
- Afrasura peripherica (Strand, 1912)

Synonyms
- Asura peripherica Strand, 1912; Asura peripheria hilara Kiriakoff, 1958

Species of moth

Afrasura peripherica is a moth of the subfamily Arctiinae first described by Embrik Strand in 1912. It is found in Cameroon, the Democratic Republic of the Congo, Kenya, Rwanda and Uganda.

== Subspecies ==
- Afrasura peripherica peripherica
- Afrasura peripherica hilara (Kiriakoff, 1958) (Democratic Republic of the Congo, Rwanda)
