= Afrasura hyporhoda =

Scientific classification
- Kingdom: Animalia
- Phylum: Arthropoda
- Class: Insecta
- Order: Lepidoptera
- Superfamily: Noctuoidea
- Family: Erebidae
- Subfamily: Arctiinae
- Genus: Afrasura
- Species: A. hyporhoda

Binomial name
- Afrasura hyporhoda (Hampson, 1900)

Synonyms
- Asura hyporhoda Hampson, 1900

Species of moth

Afrasura hyporhoda is a moth of the subfamily Arctiinae first described by George Hampson in 1900. It is found in Kenya and Sierra Leone.
