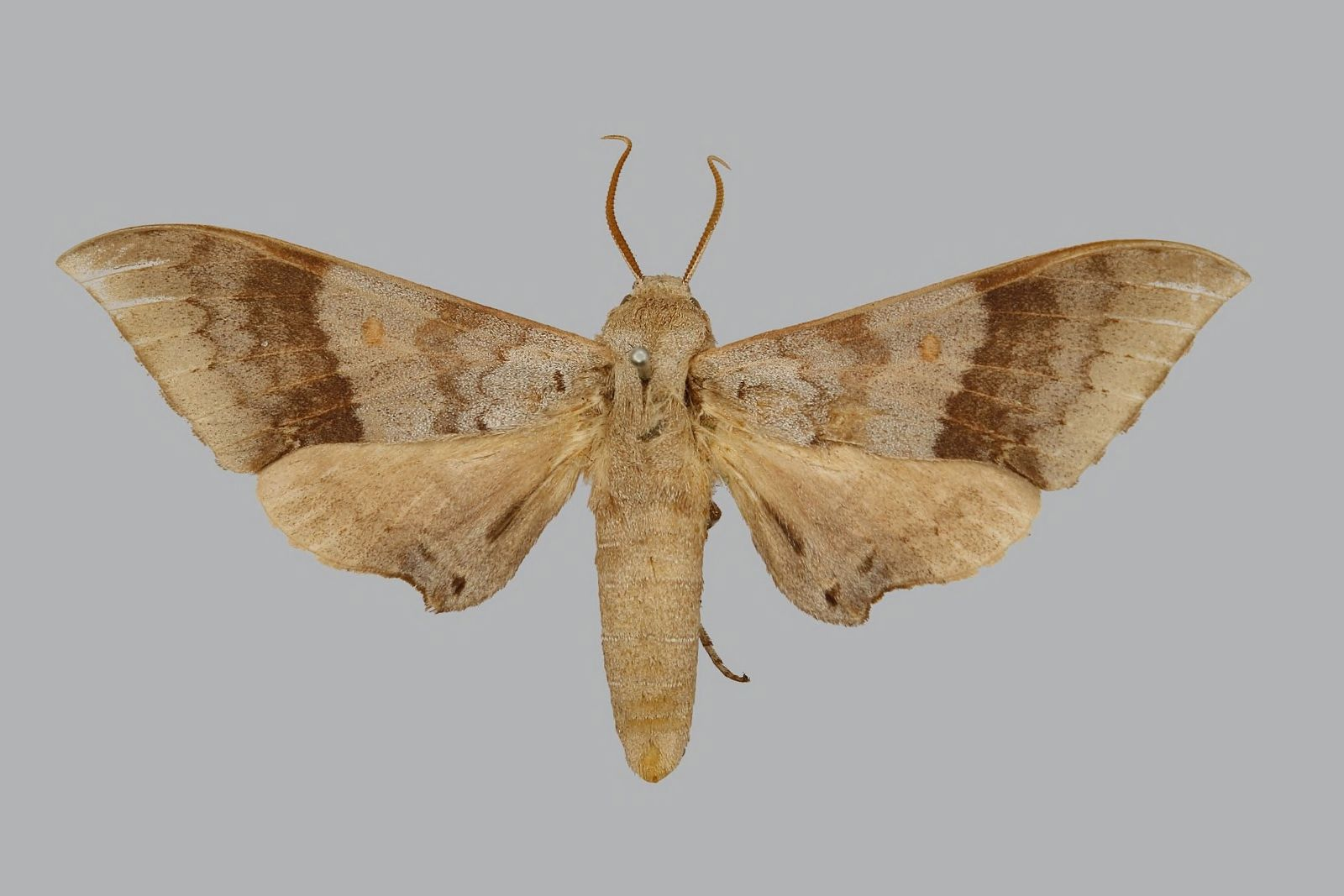
- Neopolyptychus ancylus

Scientific classification
- Kingdom: Animalia
- Phylum: Arthropoda
- Class: Insecta
- Order: Lepidoptera
- Family: Sphingidae
- Tribe: Smerinthini
- Genus: Neopolyptychus; Carcasson, 1968

= Neopolyptychus =

Genus of moths

Neopolyptychus is a genus of moths in the family Sphingidae first described by Robert Herbert Carcasson in 1968.

== Species ==
- Neopolyptychus ancylus (Rothschild & Jordan, 1916)
- Neopolyptychus centralis Basquin & Pierre, 2005
- Neopolyptychus choveti Pierre, 2004
- Neopolyptychus compar (Rothschild & Jordan 1903)
- Neopolyptychus consimilis (Rothschild & Jordan 1903)
- Neopolyptychus convexus (Rothschild & Jordan 1903)
- Neopolyptychus prionites (Rothschild & Jordan 1916)
- Neopolyptychus pygarga (Karsch 1891)
- Neopolyptychus serrator (Jordan 1929)
- Neopolyptychus spurrelli (Rothschild & Jordan, 1912)
