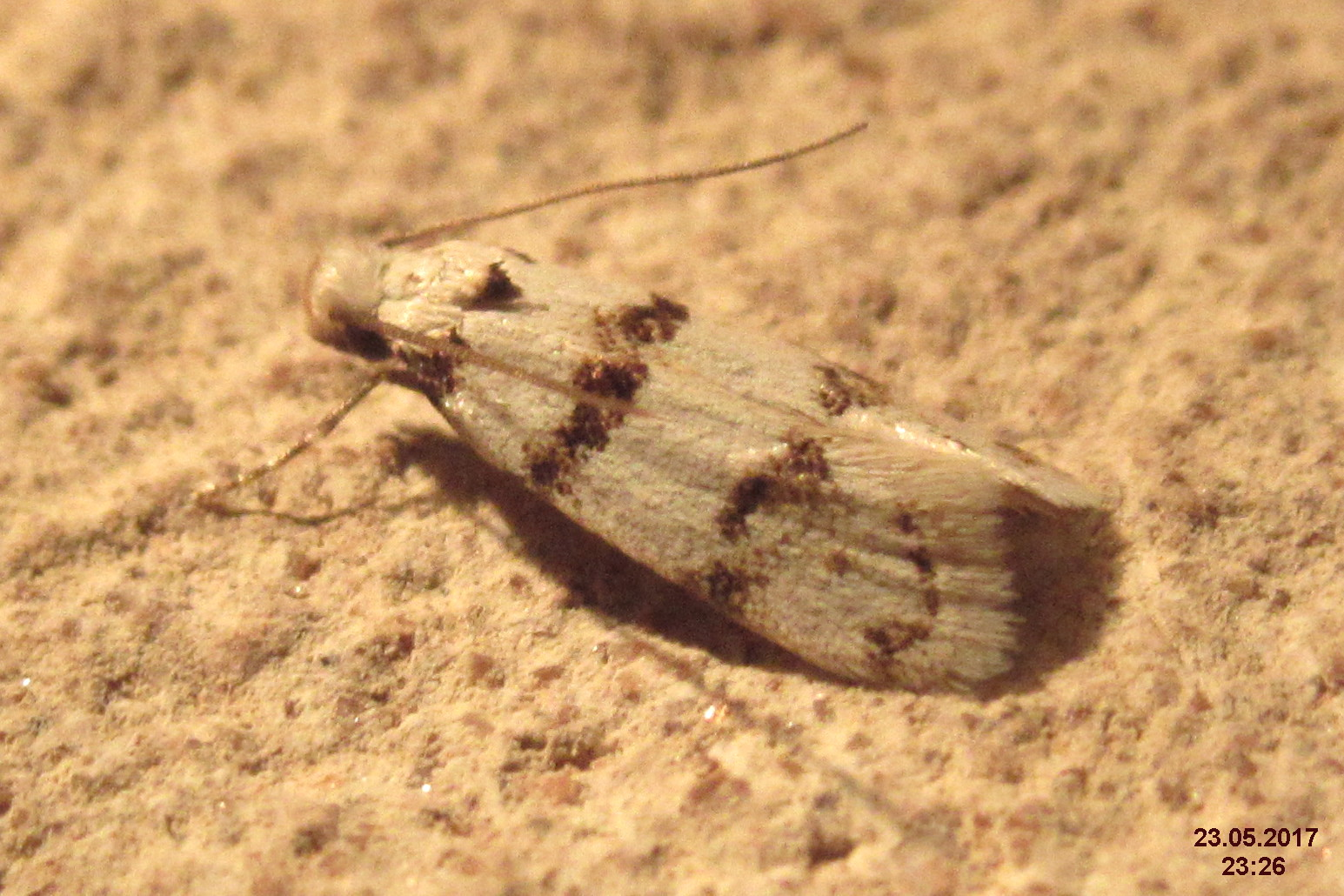
- Aprominta sp.

Scientific classification
- Kingdom: Animalia
- Phylum: Arthropoda
- Clade: Pancrustacea
- Class: Insecta
- Order: Lepidoptera
- Family: Autostichidae
- Subfamily: Symmocinae
- Genus: Aprominta; Gozmány, 1957

Synonyms
- Parthenoptera Gozmány, 1957

= Aprominta =

Genus of moths

Aprominta is a Palearctic moth genus in the family Autostichidae. One species Aprominta australis Gozmány, 1966 is Afrotropical.

== Species ==
- Aprominta africana Gozmány, 1961
- Aprominta afrogypsa Gozmány, 1988
- Aprominta aga Gozmány, 1962
- Aprominta aladdin Gozmány, 1963
- Aprominta aperitta Gozmány, 1997
- Aprominta arenbergeri Gozmány, 1969
- Aprominta argonauta Gozmány, 1964
- Aprominta atricanella (Rebel, 1906)
- Aprominta australis Gozmány, 1966
- Aprominta bifasciata (Staudinger, 1870)
- Aprominta cryptogamarum (Millière, 1872)
- Aprominta designatella (Herrich-Schäffer, 1855)
- Aprominta gloriosa Gozmány, 1959
- Aprominta marthae Gozmány, 2000
- Aprominta pannosella (Rebel, 1906)
- Aprominta reisseri Gozmány, 1959
- Aprominta separata Gozmány, 1961
- Aprominta syriacella (Ragonot, 1895)
- Aprominta tectaphella (Rebel, 1916)
- Aprominta xena Gozmány, 1959
- Aprominta yatagan Gozmány, 2008
