= Neopolyptychus centralis =

Scientific classification
- Kingdom: Animalia
- Phylum: Arthropoda
- Clade: Pancrustacea
- Class: Insecta
- Order: Lepidoptera
- Family: Sphingidae
- Genus: Neopolyptychus
- Species: N. centralis

Binomial name
- Neopolyptychus centralis Basquin & Pierre, 2005

Species of moth

Neopolyptychus centralis is a moth of the family Sphingidae. It is known from the Central African Republic.
