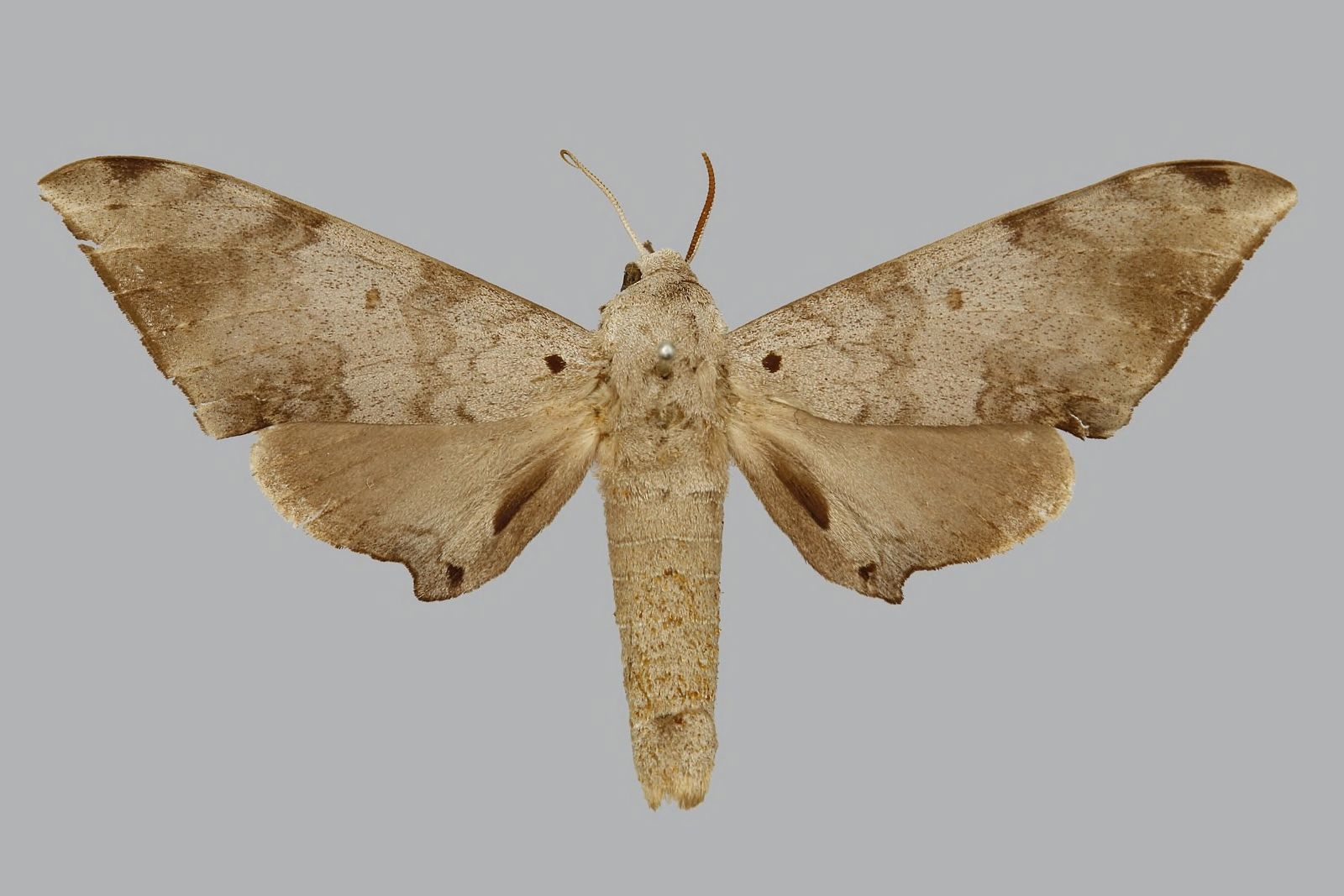
- Neopolyptychus spurrelli, male, upperside. Ghana, Gold Coast, 70 miles N.W. of Dimkwa, Bibianaha

Scientific classification
- Kingdom: Animalia
- Phylum: Arthropoda
- Class: Insecta
- Order: Lepidoptera
- Family: Sphingidae
- Genus: Neopolyptychus
- Species: N. spurrelli

Binomial name
- Neopolyptychus spurrelli (Rothschild & Jordan, 1912)

Synonyms
- Neopolyptychus pygarga spurrelli; Polyptychus spurrelli Rothschild & Jordan, 1912

= Neopolyptychus spurrelli =

Species of moth

Neopolyptychus spurrelli is a moth of the family Sphingidae. It is found from Ghana to Sierra Leone.

The forewing is 32–39 mm for males and 36–40 mm for females.
