= Acracona elgonae =

Scientific classification
- Kingdom: Animalia
- Phylum: Arthropoda
- Clade: Pancrustacea
- Class: Insecta
- Order: Lepidoptera
- Family: Pyralidae
- Genus: Acracona
- Species: A. elgonae

Binomial name
- Acracona elgonae Whalley, 1964

Species of moth

Acracona elgonae is a species of snout moth in the genus Acracona. It was described by Paul Whalley, in 1964, and is known from Uganda.
