= Afromurzinia fletcheri =

Scientific classification
- Domain: Eukaryota
- Kingdom: Animalia
- Phylum: Arthropoda
- Class: Insecta
- Order: Lepidoptera
- Superfamily: Noctuoidea
- Family: Erebidae
- Subfamily: Arctiinae
- Genus: Afromurzinia
- Species: A. fletcheri

Binomial name
- Afromurzinia fletcheri (Kiriakoff, 1958)

Synonyms
- Spilosoma sublutescens fletcheri Kiriakoff, 1958

Species of moth

Afromurzinia fletcheri is a moth in the family Erebidae. It was described by Sergius G. Kiriakoff in 1958. It is found in Tanzania.
