= Afrowatsonius =

Scientific classification
- Kingdom: Animalia
- Phylum: Arthropoda
- Clade: Pancrustacea
- Class: Insecta
- Order: Lepidoptera
- Superfamily: Noctuoidea
- Family: Erebidae
- Subfamily: Arctiinae
- Subtribe: Spilosomina
- Genus: Afrowatsonius; Dubatolov, 2006

Type species
- Aloa marginalis Walker, 1855

Genus of moths

Afrowatsonius is a genus of tiger moths in the family Erebidae.

== Species ==
- Afrowatsonius burgeoni (Talbot, 1928)
- Afrowatsonius fulvomarginalis (Wichgraf, 1921)
- Afrowatsonius marginalis (Walker, 1855)
- Afrowatsonius spilleri (Bethune-Baker, 1908)
- Afrowatsonius sudanicus (Rothschild, 1933)
