= Acracona remipedalis =

Scientific classification
- Kingdom: Animalia
- Phylum: Arthropoda
- Clade: Pancrustacea
- Class: Insecta
- Order: Lepidoptera
- Family: Pyralidae
- Genus: Acracona
- Species: A. remipedalis

Binomial name
- Acracona remipedalis Karsch, 1900

Synonyms
- Acracona metachryseis Hampson, 1917; Acracona flammealis Hampson, 1917; Thermauge flavicilialis Hampson, 1906

Species of moth

Acracona remipedalis is a species of snout moth in the genus Acracona. It was described by Ferdinand Karsch in 1900 and is known from Togo, Sierra Leone and Nigeria.
