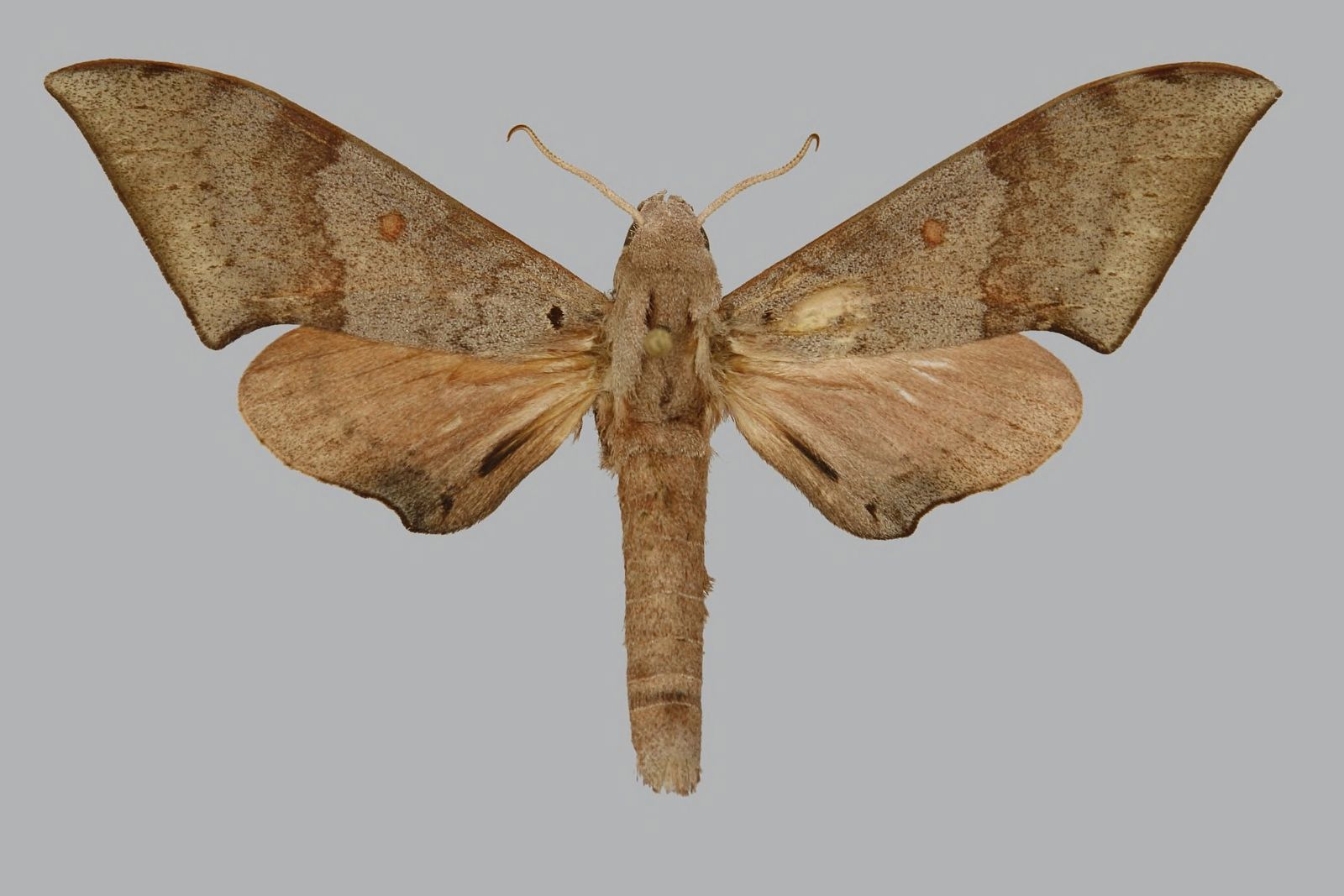
- Dorsal view

Scientific classification
- Kingdom: Animalia
- Phylum: Arthropoda
- Class: Insecta
- Order: Lepidoptera
- Family: Sphingidae
- Genus: Neopolyptychus
- Species: N. choveti

Binomial name
- Neopolyptychus choveti Pierre, 2004

= Neopolyptychus choveti =

Species of moth

Neopolyptychus choveti is a moth of the family Sphingidae. It is known from Cameroon.

The forewing is 25–32 mm for males.
