= Afrasura dubitabilis =

Scientific classification
- Kingdom: Animalia
- Phylum: Arthropoda
- Clade: Pancrustacea
- Class: Insecta
- Order: Lepidoptera
- Superfamily: Noctuoidea
- Family: Erebidae
- Subfamily: Arctiinae
- Genus: Afrasura
- Species: A. dubitabilis

Binomial name
- Afrasura dubitabilis Durante, 2009

Species of moth

Afrasura dubitabilis is a moth of the subfamily Arctiinae, which is endemic to Nigeria.
