= Afrasura aetheria =

Scientific classification
- Domain: Eukaryota
- Kingdom: Animalia
- Phylum: Arthropoda
- Class: Insecta
- Order: Lepidoptera
- Superfamily: Noctuoidea
- Family: Erebidae
- Subfamily: Arctiinae
- Genus: Afrasura
- Species: A. aetheria

Binomial name
- Afrasura aetheria Durante, 2012

Species of moth

Afrasura aetheria is a moth of the subfamily Arctiinae. It was described by Antonio Durante in 2012 and is endemic to Gabon.
