= Afrowatsonius spilleri =

Scientific classification
- Domain: Eukaryota
- Kingdom: Animalia
- Phylum: Arthropoda
- Class: Insecta
- Order: Lepidoptera
- Superfamily: Noctuoidea
- Family: Erebidae
- Subfamily: Arctiinae
- Genus: Afrowatsonius
- Species: A. spilleri

Binomial name
- Afrowatsonius spilleri (Bethune-Baker, 1908)

Synonyms
- Creatonotos spilleri Bethune-Baker, 1908; Digama spilleri

Species of moth

Afrowatsonius spilleri is a moth of the family Erebidae first described by George Thomas Bethune-Baker in 1908. It is found in Africa, including South Africa.
