= Aprominta cryptogamarum =

Scientific classification
- Domain: Eukaryota
- Kingdom: Animalia
- Phylum: Arthropoda
- Class: Insecta
- Order: Lepidoptera
- Family: Autostichidae
- Genus: Aprominta
- Species: A. cryptogamarum

Binomial name
- Aprominta cryptogamarum (Millière, 1872)

Synonyms
- Oecophora cryptogamarum Millière, 1872; Symmoca subalbida Legrand, 1947; Symmoca obscura Legrand, 1947

Species of moth

Aprominta cryptogamarum is a moth of the family Autostichidae. It is found in France, Italy and Spain.
