= Acracona pratti =

Scientific classification
- Kingdom: Animalia
- Phylum: Arthropoda
- Clade: Pancrustacea
- Class: Insecta
- Order: Lepidoptera
- Family: Pyralidae
- Genus: Acracona
- Species: A. pratti

Binomial name
- Acracona pratti (Kenrick, 1917)

Synonyms
- Acara pratti Kenrick, 1917

Species of moth

Acracona pratti is a species of snout moth in the genus Acracona. It was described by George Hamilton Kenrick in 1917 and is known from Madagascar.

The male of this species has a wingspan of 50 mm, the female of 70 mm.
