= Afrasura clara =

Scientific classification
- Kingdom: Animalia
- Phylum: Arthropoda
- Class: Insecta
- Order: Lepidoptera
- Superfamily: Noctuoidea
- Family: Erebidae
- Subfamily: Arctiinae
- Genus: Afrasura
- Species: A. clara

Binomial name
- Afrasura clara (Holland, 1893)

Synonyms
- Miltochrista clara Holland, 1893; Asura clara

Species of moth

Afrasura clara is a moth of the subfamily Arctiinae. It is found in western Africa.
