= Afrasura terlinea =

Scientific classification
- Kingdom: Animalia
- Phylum: Arthropoda
- Clade: Pancrustacea
- Class: Insecta
- Order: Lepidoptera
- Superfamily: Noctuoidea
- Family: Erebidae
- Subfamily: Arctiinae
- Genus: Afrasura
- Species: A. terlinea

Binomial name
- Afrasura terlinea Durante, 2009

Species of moth

Afrasura terlinea is a moth of the subfamily Arctiinae which is endemic to Ethiopia.
