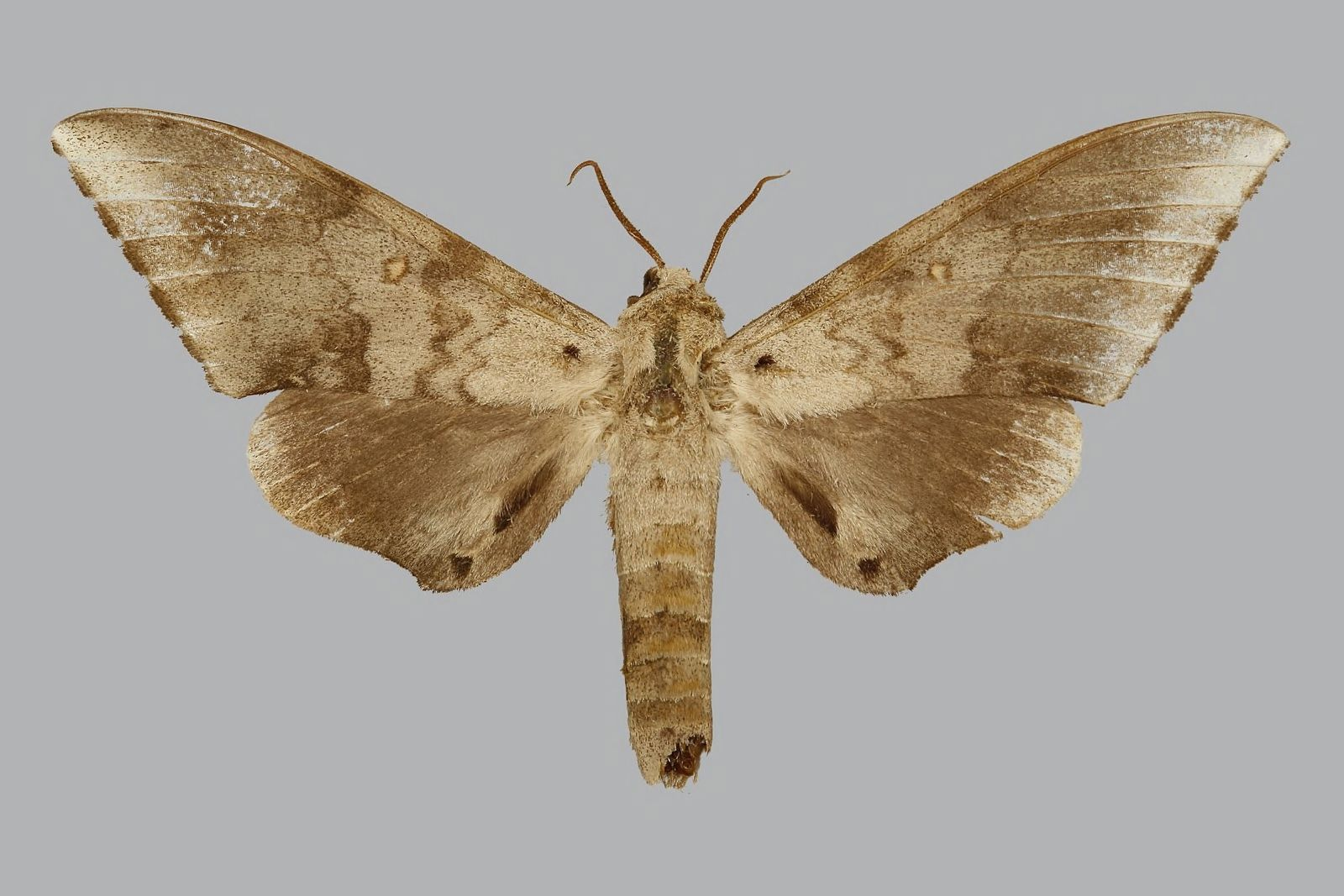

Scientific classification
- Kingdom: Animalia
- Phylum: Arthropoda
- Class: Insecta
- Order: Lepidoptera
- Family: Sphingidae
- Genus: Neopolyptychus
- Species: N. pygarga

Binomial name
- Neopolyptychus pygarga (Karsch, 1891)

Synonyms
- Neopolyptychus pygargus; Dewitzia pygarga Karsch, 1891; Polyptychus pygarga

= Neopolyptychus pygarga =

Species of moth

Neopolyptychus pygarga is a moth of the family Sphingidae. It is known from forests in western Africa, including Cameroon and Nigeria.

The forewing is 33–38 mm for males.
