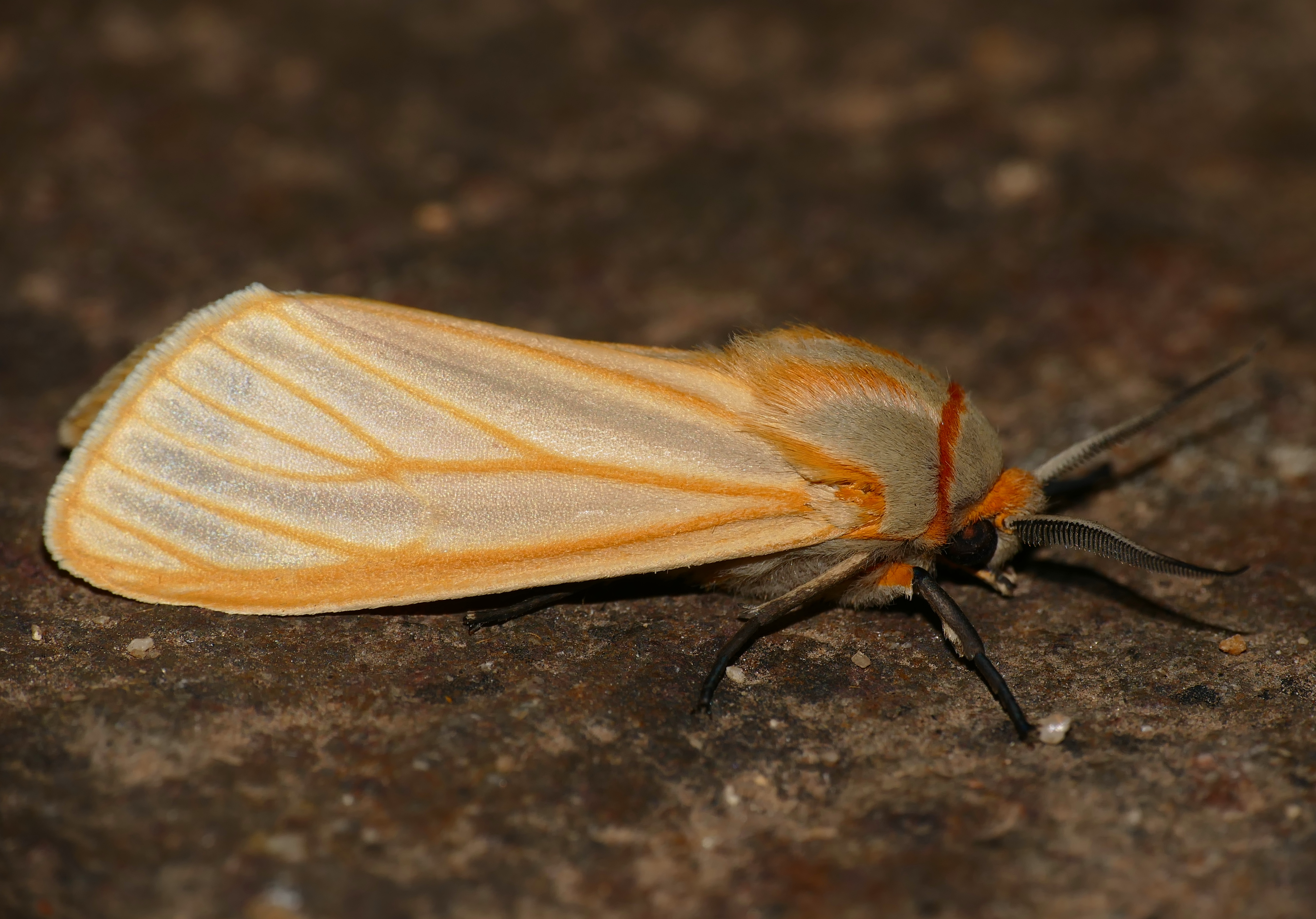
- Translucent Ermine (Spilosoma lutescens)

Scientific classification
- Kingdom: Animalia
- Phylum: Arthropoda
- Clade: Pancrustacea
- Class: Insecta
- Order: Lepidoptera
- Superfamily: Noctuoidea
- Family: Erebidae
- Subfamily: Arctiinae
- Subtribe: Spilosomina
- Genus: Afromurzinia; Dubatolov & Haynes, 2008

Type species
- Spilosoma lutescens Walker, 1855

= Afromurzinia =

Genus of moths

Afromurzinia is a genus of tiger moths in the family Erebidae and found in the Afrotropics. The genus was erected by Vladimir Viktorovitch Dubatolov and Patrick G. Haynes in 2008.

== Species ==
- Afromurzinia fletcheri (Kiriakoff, 1958)
- Afromurzinia lutescens (Walker, 1855)
- Afromurzinia sublutescens (Kiriakoff, 1958)
