= Aprominta aladdin =

Scientific classification
- Kingdom: Animalia
- Phylum: Arthropoda
- Clade: Pancrustacea
- Class: Insecta
- Order: Lepidoptera
- Family: Autostichidae
- Genus: Aprominta
- Species: A. aladdin

Binomial name
- Aprominta aladdin Gozmány, 1963

Species of moth

Aprominta aladdin is a moth in the family Autostichidae. It was described by László Anthony Gozmány in 1963. It is found in Syria.
