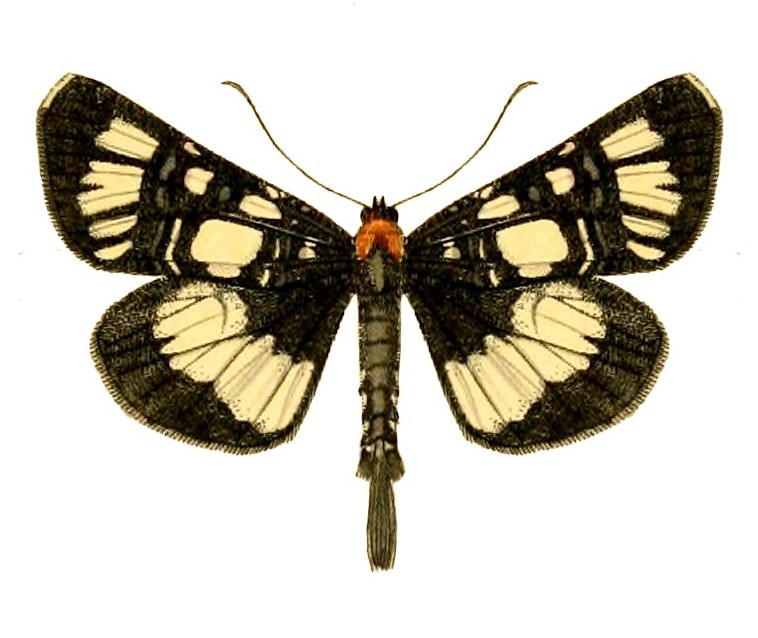
- Hespagarista caudata

Scientific classification
- Kingdom: Animalia
- Phylum: Arthropoda
- Class: Insecta
- Order: Lepidoptera
- Superfamily: Noctuoidea
- Family: Noctuidae
- Subfamily: Agaristinae
- Genus: Hespagarista; Walker, 1854

= Hespagarista =

Genus of moths

Hespagarista is a genus of moths of the family Noctuidae. The genus was erected by Francis Walker in 1854.

== Species ==
- Hespagarista caudata (Dewitz, 1879) Angola, Congo, Zaire, Guinea, Malawi, Tanzania, Zambia
- Hespagarista eburnea Jordan, 1915 Tanzania, Zambia, Zaire
- Hespagarista echione (Boisduval, 1847) Kenya, Burundi, Malawi, Tanzania, Mozambique, S.Africa
