= Afrasura trunca =

Scientific classification
- Kingdom: Animalia
- Phylum: Arthropoda
- Clade: Pancrustacea
- Class: Insecta
- Order: Lepidoptera
- Superfamily: Noctuoidea
- Family: Erebidae
- Subfamily: Arctiinae
- Genus: Afrasura
- Species: A. trunca

Binomial name
- Afrasura trunca Durante, 2012

Species of moth

Afrasura trunca is a moth of the subfamily Arctiinae. It was described by Antonio Durante in 2012 and is endemic to Gabon.
