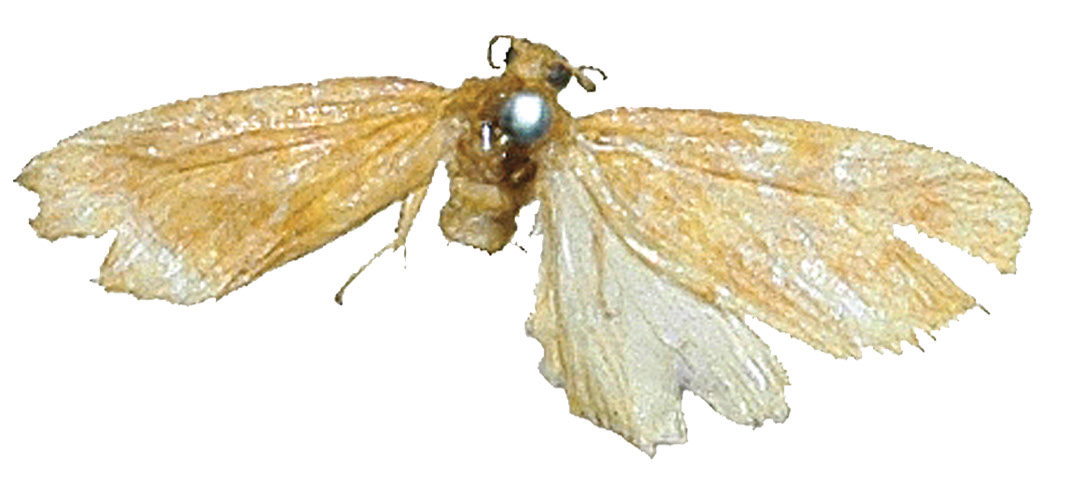
- Afrasura indecisa - holotype Congo, in BMNH.

Scientific classification
- Kingdom: Animalia
- Phylum: Arthropoda
- Class: Insecta
- Order: Lepidoptera
- Superfamily: Noctuoidea
- Family: Erebidae
- Subfamily: Arctiinae
- Genus: Afrasura
- Species: A. indecisa

Binomial name
- Afrasura indecisa (Walker, [1865])

Synonyms
- Barsine indecisa Walker, 1869; Paidia rufostria Plötz, 1880; Asura guentheri Strand, 1912; Asura xantha Bethune-Baker, 1911

= Afrasura indecisa =

Species of moth

Afrasura indecisa is a moth of the subfamily Arctiinae. It is found in Angola, Cameroon, the Democratic Republic of Congo, Equatorial Guinea, Ethiopia, Gabon, Ghana, Kenya, Nigeria, Uganda and Zimbabwe.

== Subspecies ==
- Afrasura indecisa indecisa
- Afrasura indecisa orientalis Durante, 2009 (Ethiopia)
