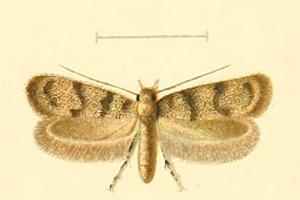

Scientific classification
- Domain: Eukaryota
- Kingdom: Animalia
- Phylum: Arthropoda
- Class: Insecta
- Order: Lepidoptera
- Family: Autostichidae
- Genus: Aprominta
- Species: A. tectaphella

Binomial name
- Aprominta tectaphella (Rebel, 1916)

Synonyms
- Symmoca tectaphella Rebel, 1916

= Aprominta tectaphella =

Species of moth

Aprominta tectaphella is a moth of the family Autostichidae. It is found on Crete.

The wingspan is 12-12.5 mm. The ground colour of the forewings is white, sprinkled with brown. The hindwings are dark brownish grey.
