= Afrasura discocellularis =

Scientific classification
- Kingdom: Animalia
- Phylum: Arthropoda
- Class: Insecta
- Order: Lepidoptera
- Superfamily: Noctuoidea
- Family: Erebidae
- Subfamily: Arctiinae
- Genus: Afrasura
- Species: A. discocellularis

Binomial name
- Afrasura discocellularis (Strand, 1912)

Synonyms
- Asura discocellularis Strand, 1912

Species of moth

Afrasura discocellularis is a moth of the subfamily Arctiinae. It is found in Cameroon, Gabon, Ghana and Ivory Coast.
