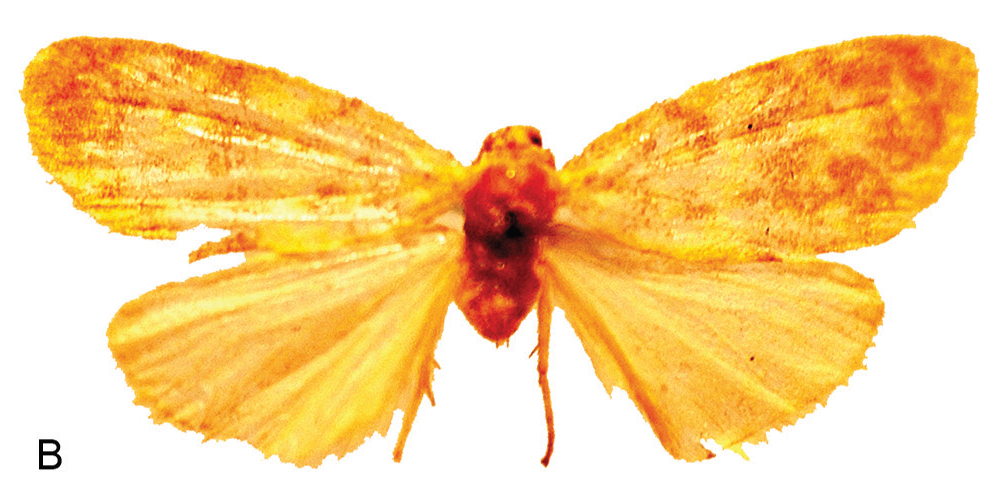
- Afrasura ichorina (Butler, 1877), ♀, South Africa, in BMNH.

Scientific classification
- Domain: Eukaryota
- Kingdom: Animalia
- Phylum: Arthropoda
- Class: Insecta
- Order: Lepidoptera
- Superfamily: Noctuoidea
- Family: Erebidae
- Subfamily: Arctiinae
- Genus: Afrasura
- Species: A. ichorina

Binomial name
- Afrasura ichorina (Butler, 1877)

Synonyms
- Sesapa ichorina Butler, 1877; Asura ichorina; Xanthetis ichorina

= Afrasura ichorina =

Species of moth

Afrasura ichorina is a moth of the subfamily Arctiinae first described by Arthur Gardiner Butler in 1877. It is found in Kenya and South Africa.
