= Aprominta separata =

Scientific classification
- Kingdom: Animalia
- Phylum: Arthropoda
- Clade: Pancrustacea
- Class: Insecta
- Order: Lepidoptera
- Family: Autostichidae
- Genus: Aprominta
- Species: A. separata

Binomial name
- Aprominta separata Gozmány, 1961

Species of moth

Aprominta separata is a moth of the family Autostichidae. It is found on Crete.
