= Afrasura violacea =

Scientific classification
- Domain: Eukaryota
- Kingdom: Animalia
- Phylum: Arthropoda
- Class: Insecta
- Order: Lepidoptera
- Superfamily: Noctuoidea
- Family: Erebidae
- Subfamily: Arctiinae
- Genus: Afrasura
- Species: A. violacea

Binomial name
- Afrasura violacea (Cieślak & Häuser, 2006)

Synonyms
- Asura violacea Cieślak & Häuser, 2006

Species of moth

Afrasura violacea is a moth of the subfamily Arctiinae. It is found in the Democratic Republic of the Congo, Ghana, Kenya, Rwanda, and Uganda.
