= Neopolyptychus serrator =

Scientific classification
- Domain: Eukaryota
- Kingdom: Animalia
- Phylum: Arthropoda
- Class: Insecta
- Order: Lepidoptera
- Family: Sphingidae
- Genus: Neopolyptychus
- Species: N. serrator

Binomial name
- Neopolyptychus serrator (Jordan, 1929)

Synonyms
- Polyptychus serrator Jordan, 1929; Polyptychus serrator commodus Jordan, 1930

Species of moth

Neopolyptychus serrator is a moth of the family Sphingidae. It is known from forests from the Congo to Uganda and western Kenya. It is also known from Cameroon.

The wingspan is 31–39 mm for males and 39–44 mm for females.

The larvae feed on Maesopsis eminii.
