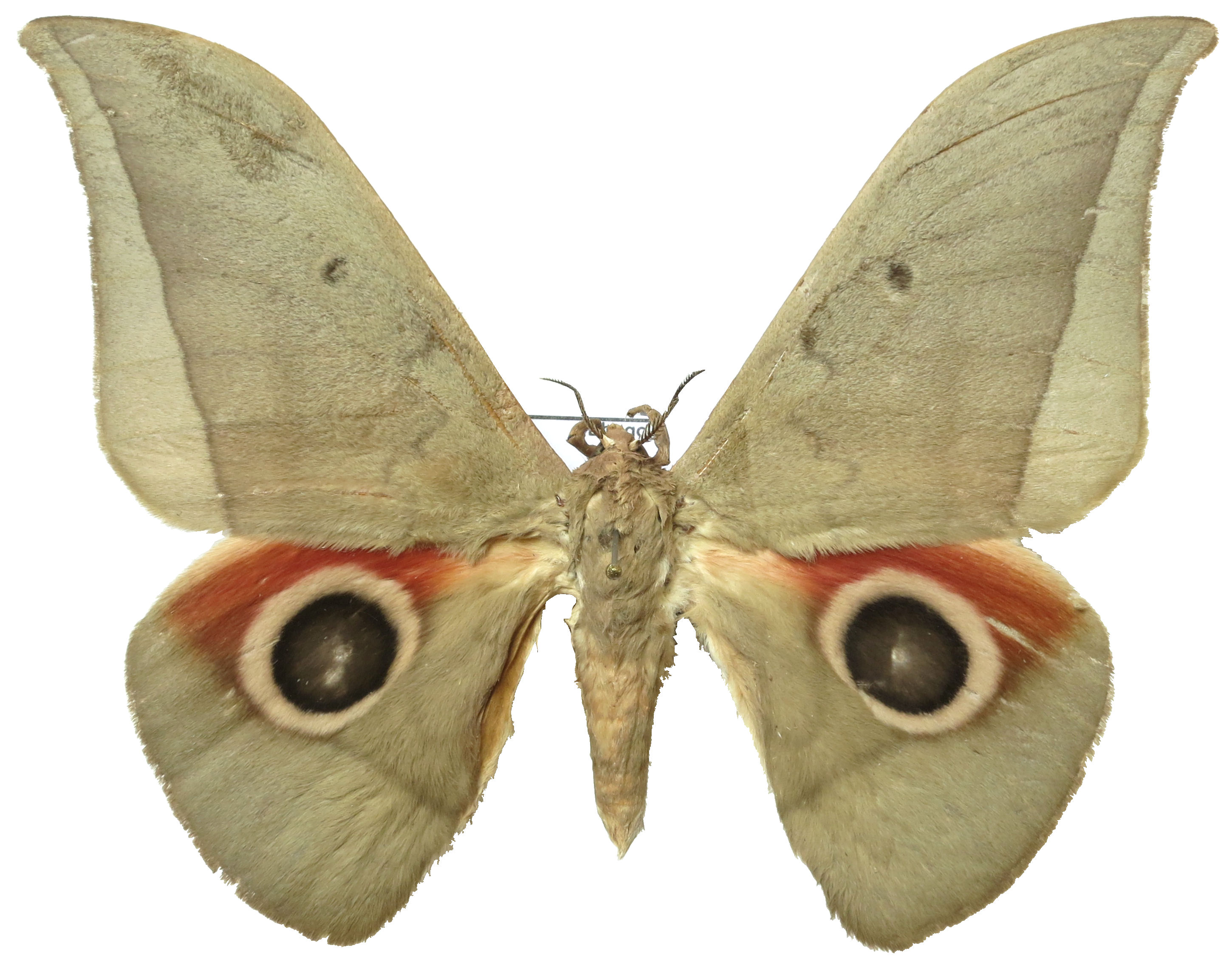
- Lobobunaea goodii

Scientific classification
- Kingdom: Animalia
- Phylum: Arthropoda
- Clade: Pancrustacea
- Class: Insecta
- Order: Lepidoptera
- Family: Saturniidae
- Subfamily: Saturniinae
- Tribe: Bunaeini
- Genus: Lobobunaea; Packard, 1901

Synonyms
- Neolobobunaea Cooper, 2002; Rougeotella Cooper, 2002

= Lobobunaea =

Genus of moths

Lobobunaea is a genus of moths in the family Saturniidae first described by Packard in 1901.

== Species ==
- Lobobunaea acetes (Westwood, 1849)
- Lobobunaea angasana (Westwood, 1849)
- Lobobunaea ansorgei (Rothschild, 1899)
- Lobobunaea basquini Rougeot, 1972
- Lobobunaea cadioui Bouyer, 2004
- Lobobunaea dallastai Bouyer, 1984
- Lobobunaea dargei Lemaire, 1971
- Lobobunaea desfontainei Darge, 1998
- Lobobunaea erythrotes (Karsch, 1893)
- Lobobunaea falcatissima Rougeot, 1962
- Lobobunaea goodii (Holland, 1893)
- Lobobunaea jeanneli Rougeot, 1959
- Lobobunaea kuehnei Naumann, 2008
- Lobobunaea melanoneura (Rothschild, 1907)
- Lobobunaea niepelti strand, 1914
- Lobobunaea phaeax Jordan, 1910
- Lobobunaea phaedusa (Drury, 1780)
- Lobobunaea rosea (Sonthonnax, 1901)
- Lobobunaea sangha Darge, 2002
- Lobobunaea saturnus (Fabricius, 1793)
- Lobobunaea tanganicae (Sonthonnax, 1901)
- Lobobunaea turlini Lemaire, 1977
- Lobobunaea vingerhoedti Bouyer, 2004
