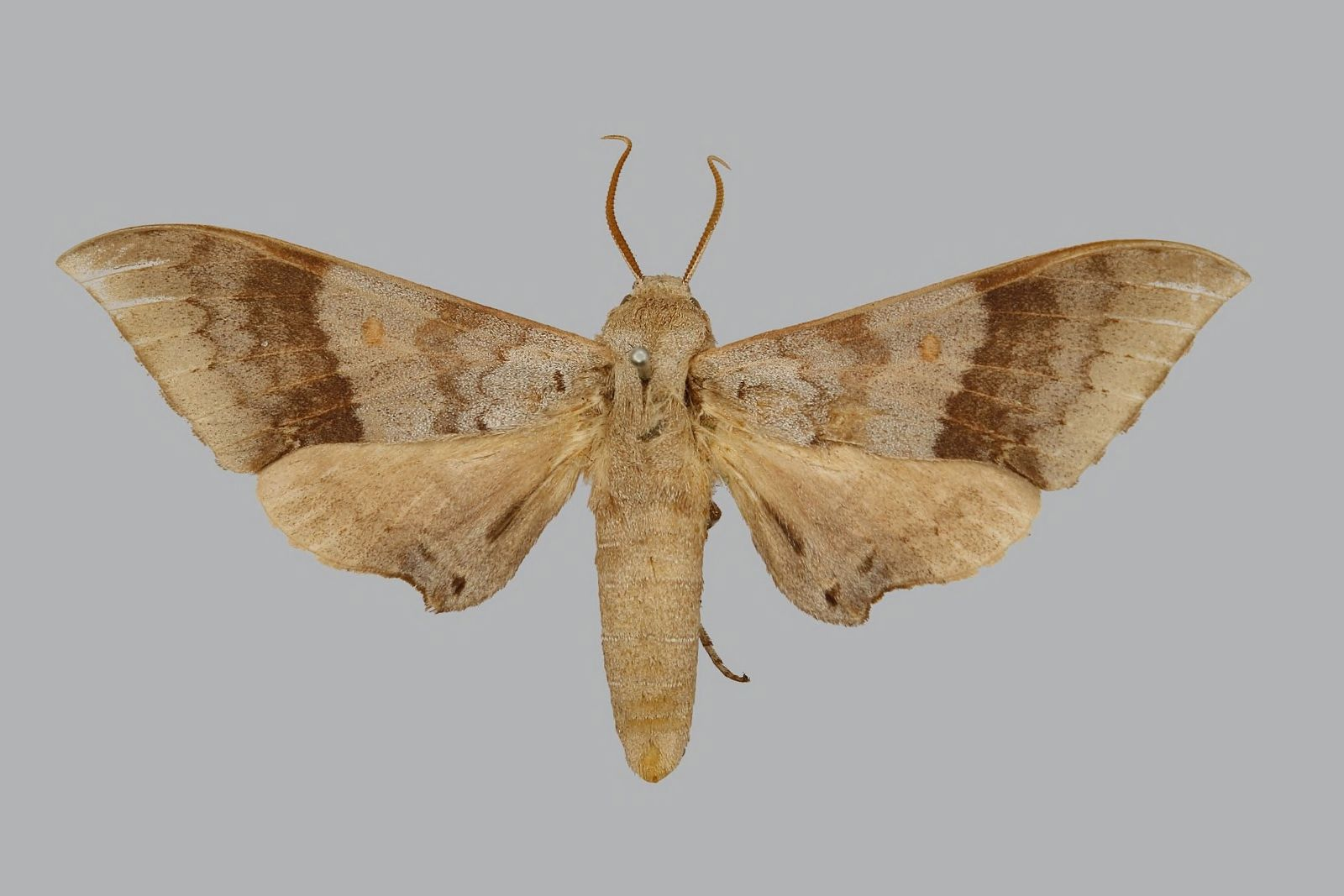

Scientific classification
- Kingdom: Animalia
- Phylum: Arthropoda
- Class: Insecta
- Order: Lepidoptera
- Family: Sphingidae
- Genus: Neopolyptychus
- Species: N. ancylus

Binomial name
- Neopolyptychus ancylus (Rothschild & Jordan, 1916)

Synonyms
- Polyptychus consimilis ancylus; Polyptychus ancylus Rothschild & Jordan, 1916

= Neopolyptychus ancylus =

Species of moth

Neopolyptychus ancylus is a moth of the family Sphingidae. It is known from Nigeria to the Ivory Coast and Guinea.

The forewing is 28–33 mm for males and 32–35 mm for females.
