= Afrowatsonius marginalis =

Scientific classification
- Kingdom: Animalia
- Phylum: Arthropoda
- Class: Insecta
- Order: Lepidoptera
- Superfamily: Noctuoidea
- Family: Erebidae
- Subfamily: Arctiinae
- Genus: Afrowatsonius
- Species: A. marginalis

Binomial name
- Afrowatsonius marginalis (Walker, 1855)

Synonyms
- Aloa marginalis Walker, 1855; Spilosoma ramivitta Walker, 1869; Creatonotus marginalis confluens Rothschild, 1933

Species of moth

Afrowatsonius marginalis is a species of moth of the family Erebidae. It is found in the Republic of Congo, the Democratic Republic of Congo, Ghana, Guinea, Ivory Coast, Malawi, Nigeria, Senegal, Sierra Leone and Togo.
