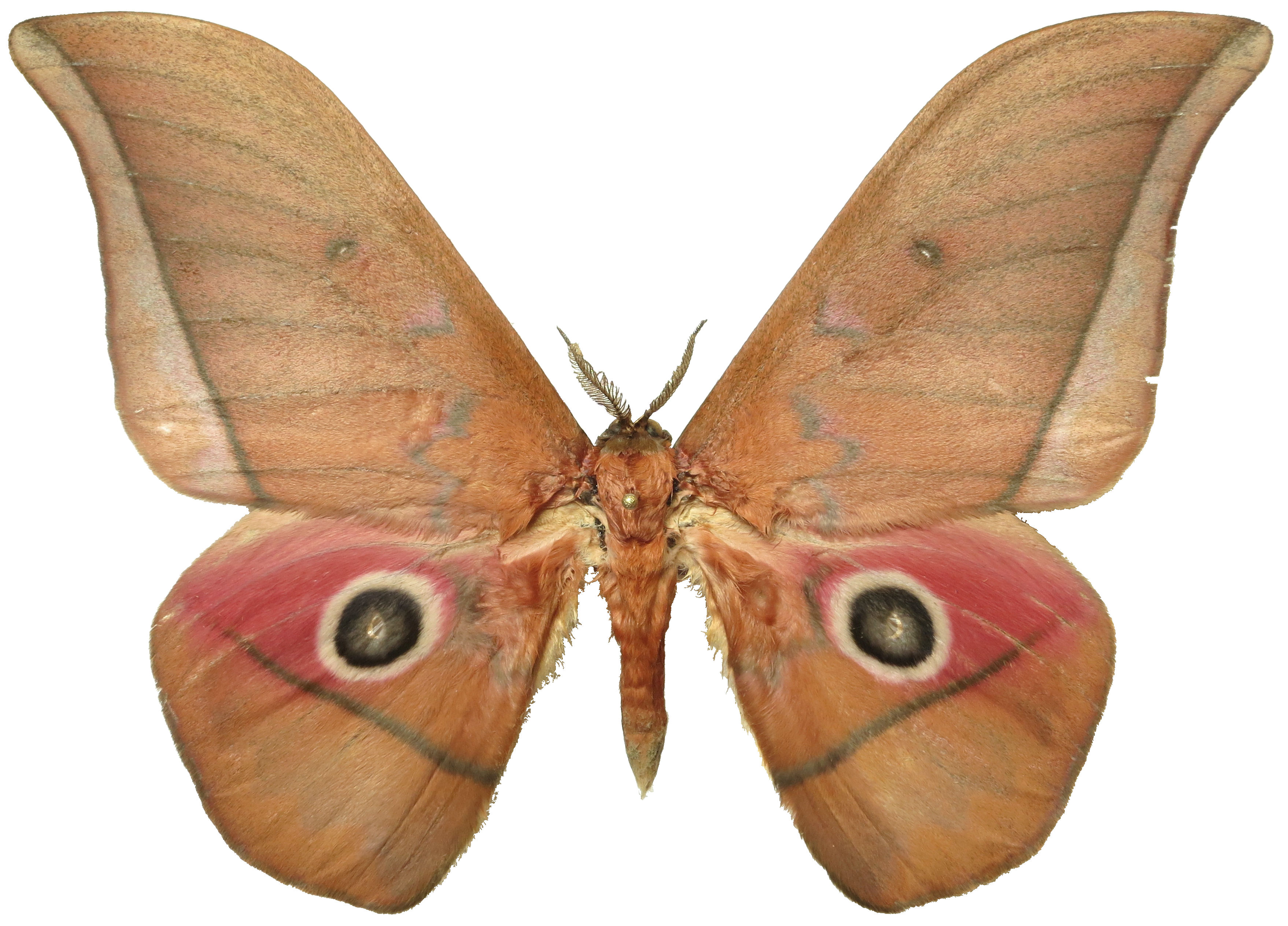
- Male from Cameroon

Scientific classification
- Kingdom: Animalia
- Phylum: Arthropoda
- Class: Insecta
- Order: Lepidoptera
- Family: Saturniidae
- Genus: Lobobunaea
- Species: L. acetes

Binomial name
- Lobobunaea acetes (Westwood, 1849)

Synonyms
- Lobobunaea alberici Dufrane, 1953; Lobobunaea rautenstrauchorum Lampe, 1994; Bunaea leopoldi Bouvier, 1930; Lobobunaea leopoldi

= Lobobunaea acetes =

Species of moth

Lobobunaea acetes is a species of moth in the family Saturniidae first described by John O. Westwood in 1849. It is found in Angola, Cameroon, the Democratic Republic of the Congo, Guinea, Kenya, Nigeria, Rwanda, Sierra Leone, Tanzania and Uganda.

== Taxonomy ==
Lobobunaea leopoldi is treated as a valid species by some sources.

== Gallery ==
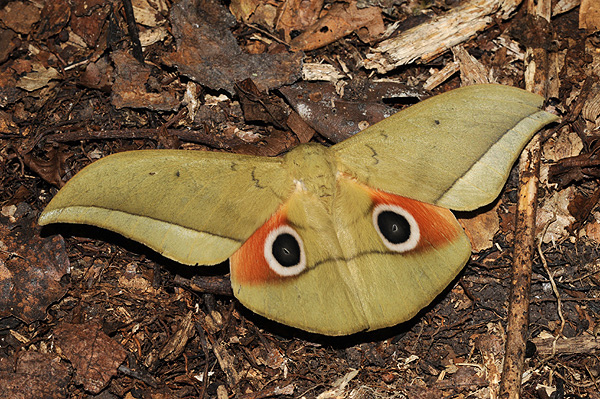
Adult from the Central African Republic
