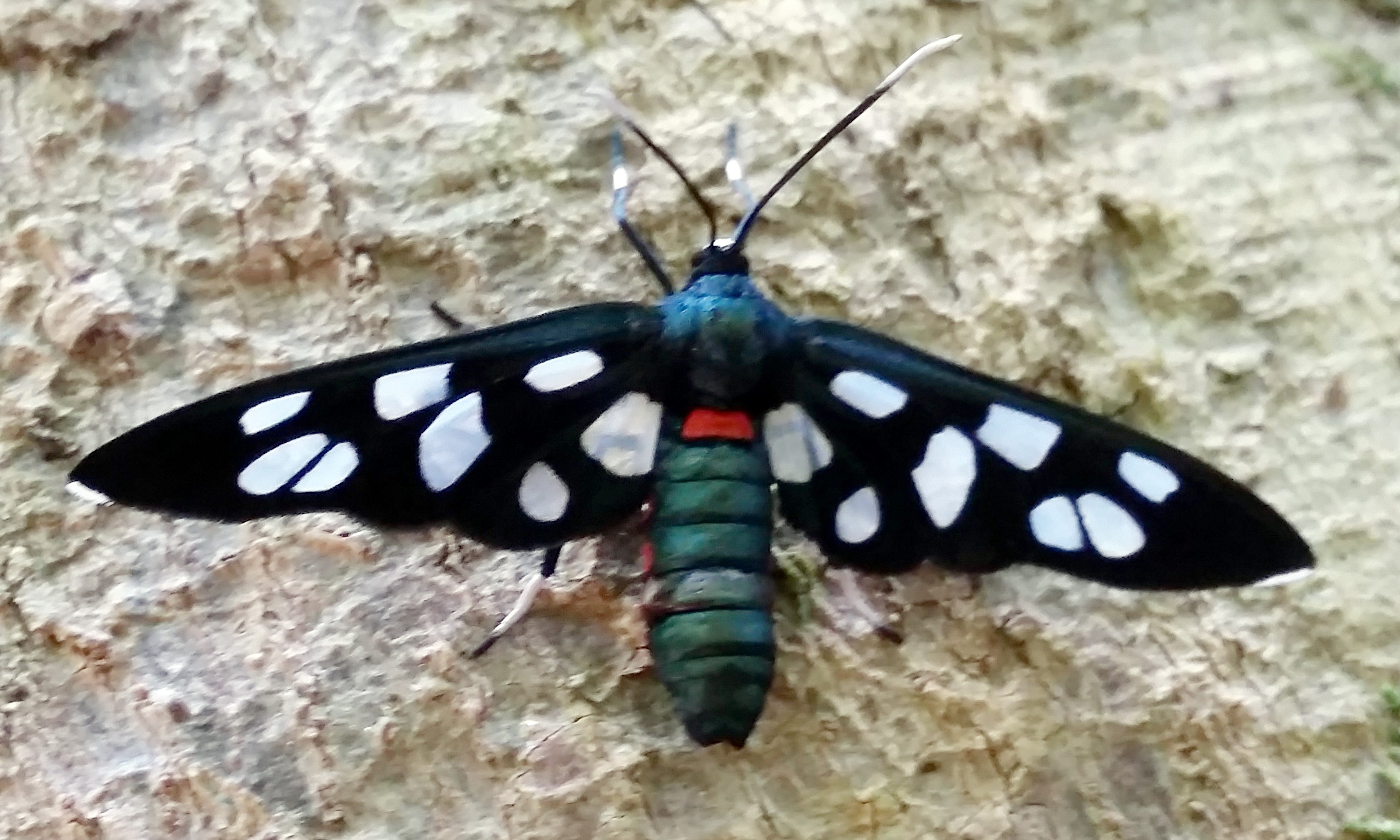

Scientific classification
- Domain: Eukaryota
- Kingdom: Animalia
- Phylum: Arthropoda
- Class: Insecta
- Order: Lepidoptera
- Superfamily: Noctuoidea
- Family: Erebidae
- Subfamily: Arctiinae
- Genus: Amata
- Species: A. kuhlweinii

Binomial name
- Amata kuhlweinii (Lefèbvre, 1832)

Synonyms
- Syntomis kuhlweini Lefèbvre, 1832; Syntomis natalii Boisduval, 1847

= Amata kuhlweini =

Cool handmaiden

Species of moth

Amata kuhlweinii, the cool handmaiden, is a moth of the family Erebidae. It was described by Alexandre Louis Lefèbvre de Cérisy in 1832 (or 1831). It is found in South Africa and Tanzania.
