= Aprominta australis =

Scientific classification
- Kingdom: Animalia
- Phylum: Arthropoda
- Clade: Pancrustacea
- Class: Insecta
- Order: Lepidoptera
- Family: Autostichidae
- Genus: Aprominta
- Species: A. australis

Binomial name
- Aprominta australis Gozmány, 1966

Species of moth

Aprominta australis is a moth in the family Autostichidae. It was described by László Anthony Gozmány in 1966. It is found in Guinea.
