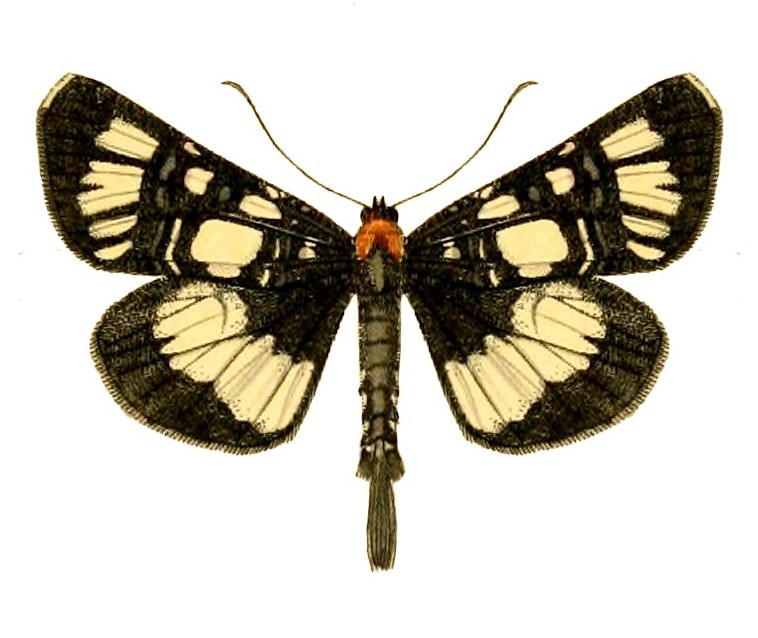

Scientific classification
- Domain: Eukaryota
- Kingdom: Animalia
- Phylum: Arthropoda
- Class: Insecta
- Order: Lepidoptera
- Superfamily: Noctuoidea
- Family: Noctuidae
- Genus: Hespagarista
- Species: H. caudata

Binomial name
- Hespagarista caudata Dewitz, 1879

Synonyms
- Agarista caudata Dewitz, 1879; Hespagarista caudata eburnea Jordan, 1915

= Hespagarista caudata =

Species of moth

Hespagarista caudata is a species of moth of the family Noctuidae. It is found in western Africa.
