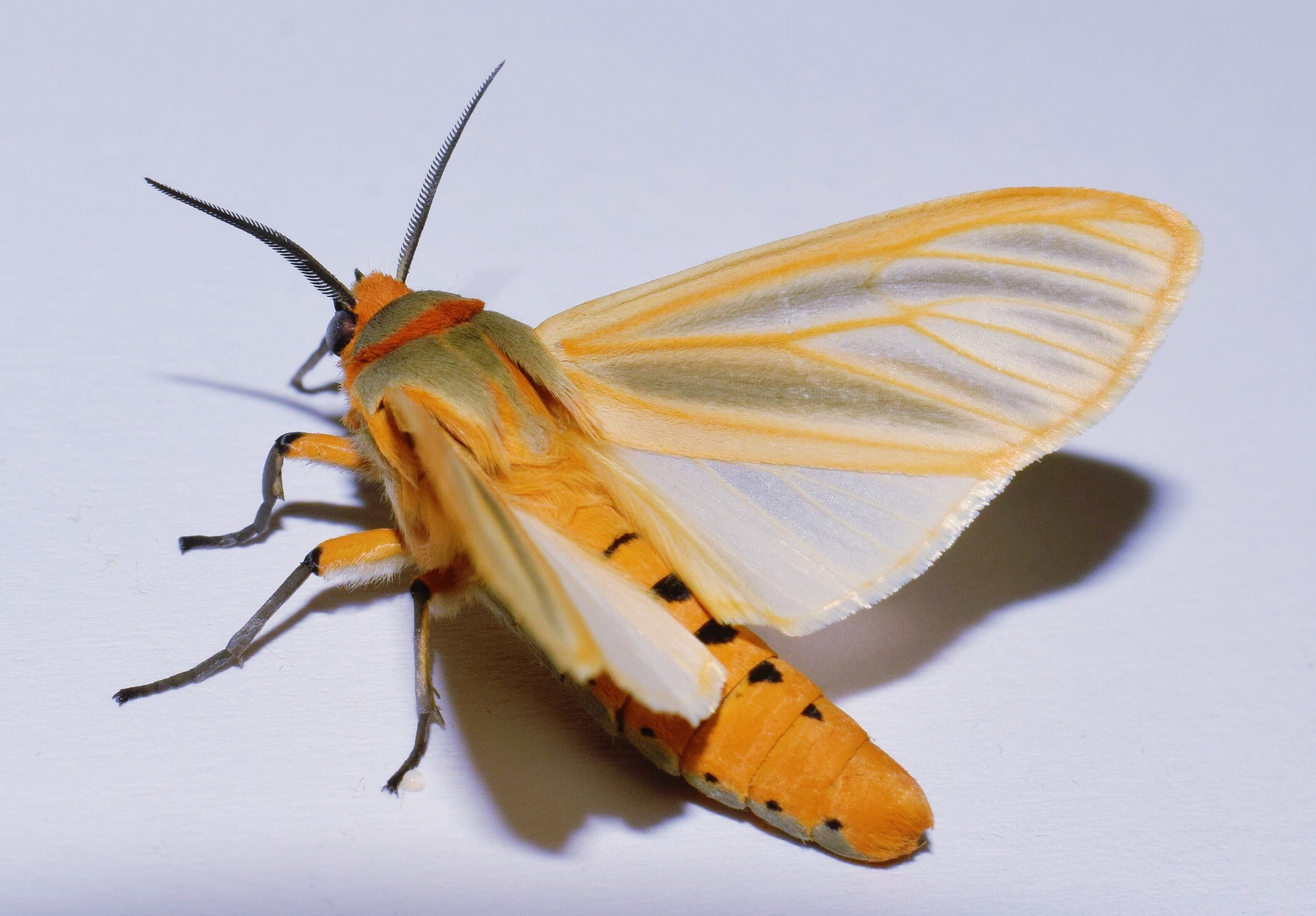

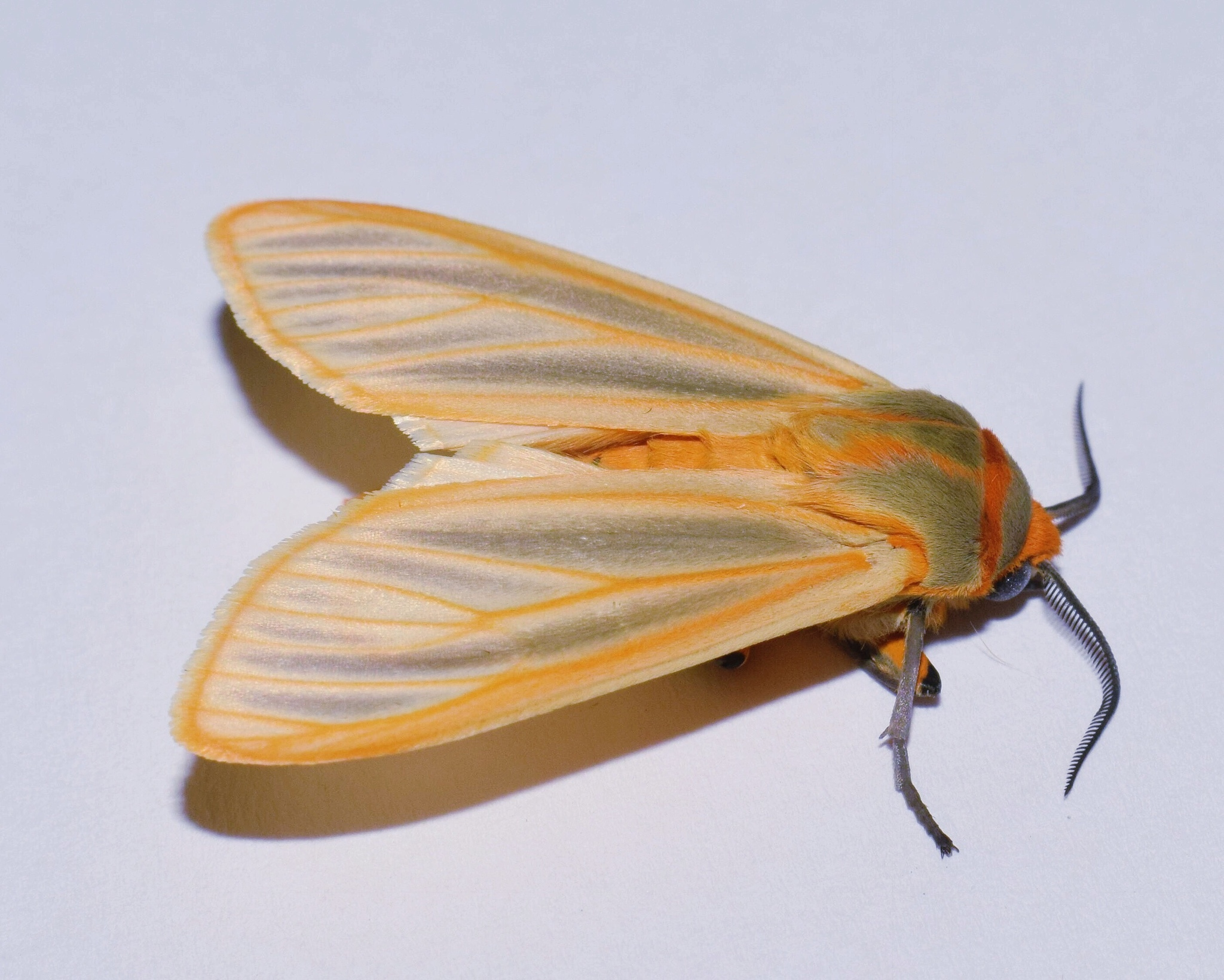

Scientific classification
- Kingdom: Animalia
- Phylum: Arthropoda
- Class: Insecta
- Order: Lepidoptera
- Superfamily: Noctuoidea
- Family: Erebidae
- Subfamily: Arctiinae
- Genus: Afromurzinia
- Species: A. lutescens

Binomial name
- Afromurzinia lutescens (Walker, 1855)

Synonyms
- Spilosoma lutescens Walker, 1855; Radiarctia lutescens; Spilosoma semihyalina Bartel, 1903; Radiarctia semihyalina

= Afromurzinia lutescens =

Translucent ermine

Species of moth

Afromurzinia lutescens is a moth in the family Erebidae. It was described by Francis Walker in 1855. It is found in Angola, Cameroon, the Democratic Republic of the Congo, Equatorial Guinea, Ethiopia, Ghana, Guinea, Guinea-Bissau, Kenya, Nigeria, Sierra Leone, Somalia, South Africa, Tanzania, Togo, Uganda and Zimbabwe.

The larvae have been recorded feeding on Ornithogalum eckloni, Zea mays, Dalbergia sissoo, Eucalyptus camaldulensis, Eucalyptus deglupta, Eucalyptus torreliana, Eucalyptus rudis, Gmelina arborea and Cassia siamea.

== Gallery ==
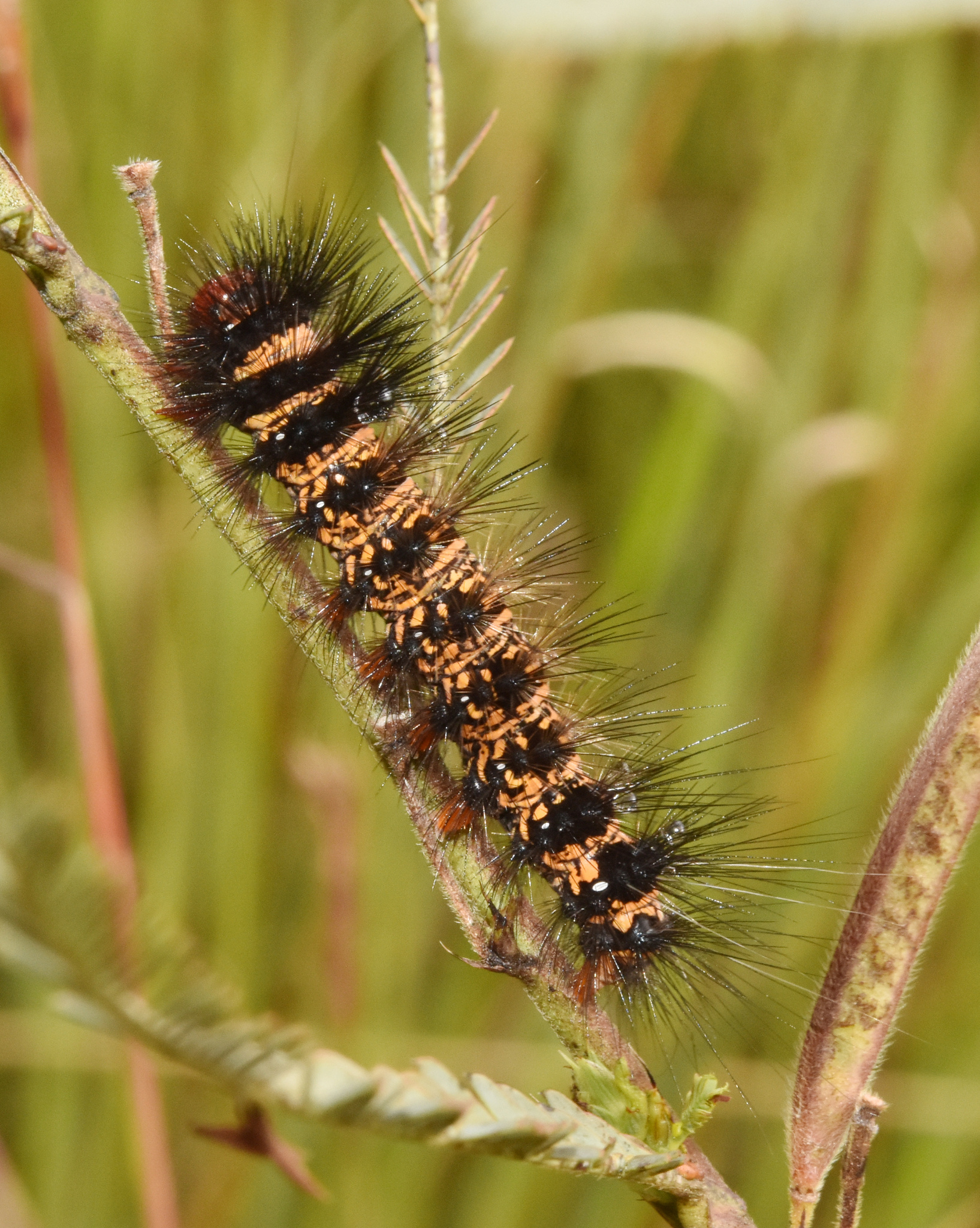
early instar

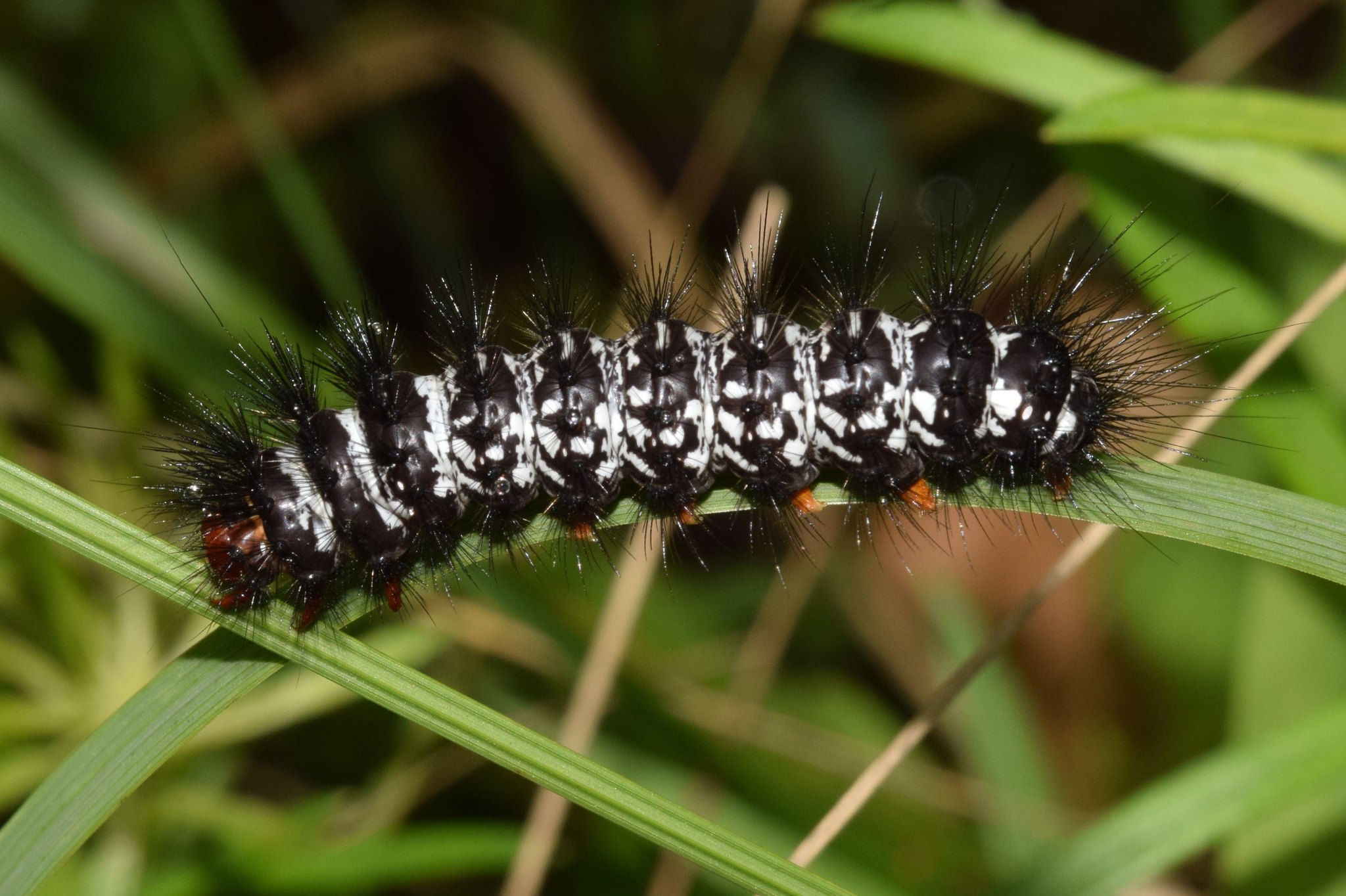
late instar

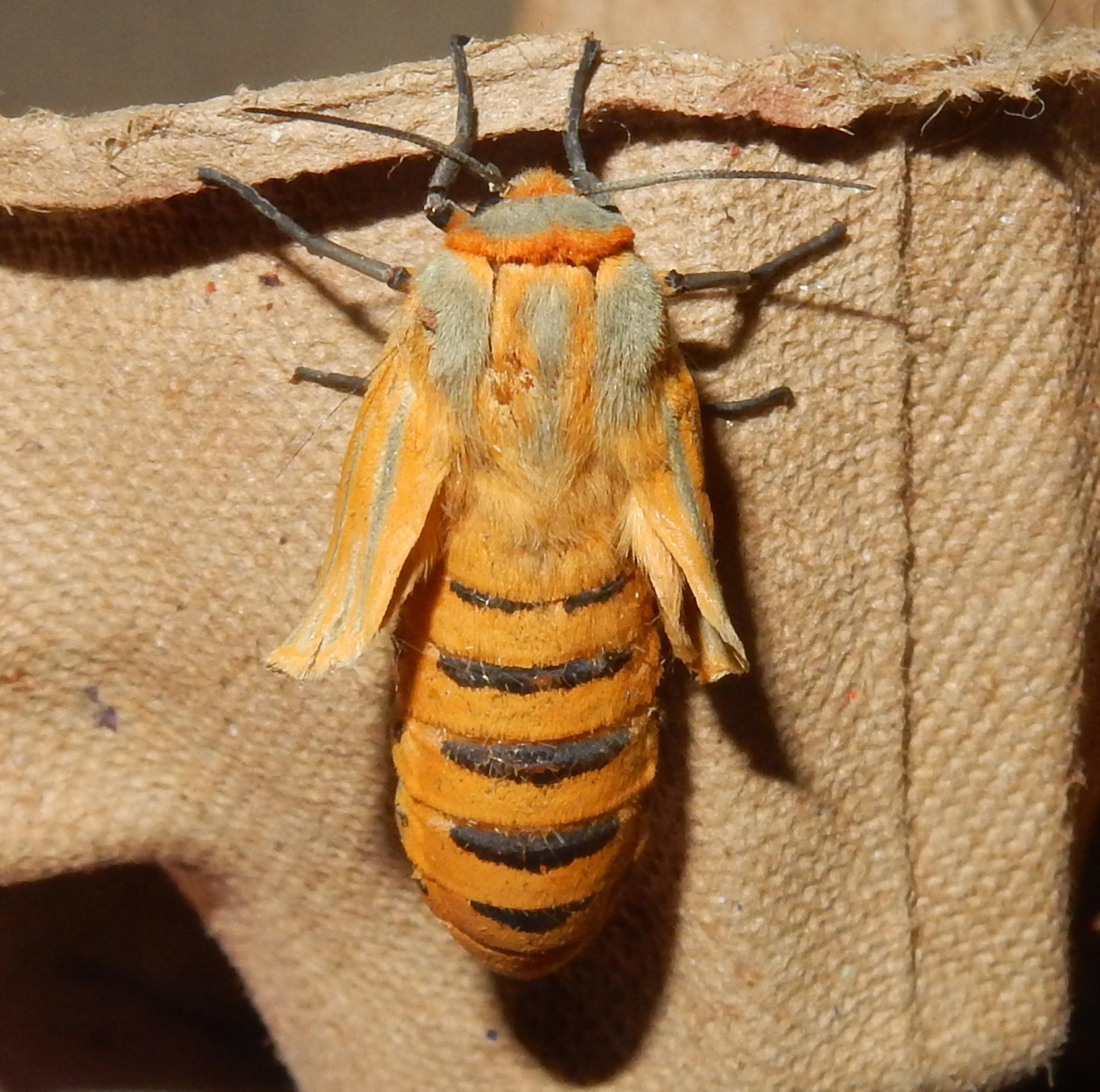
emerged imago
