= Histiovalva =

Scientific classification
- Kingdom: Animalia
- Phylum: Arthropoda
- Clade: Pancrustacea
- Class: Insecta
- Order: Lepidoptera
- Family: Tineidae
- Subfamily: Myrmecozelinae
- Genus: Histiovalva; Gozmány, 1965
- Species: H. fortunata

Binomial name
- Histiovalva fortunata Gozmány, 1965

Genus of moths

Histiovalva is a genus of moths belonging to the family Tineidae. It contains only one species, Histiovalva fortunata, which is found in Guinea.
