= Acracona lamottei =

Scientific classification
- Kingdom: Animalia
- Phylum: Arthropoda
- Clade: Pancrustacea
- Class: Insecta
- Order: Lepidoptera
- Family: Pyralidae
- Genus: Acracona
- Species: A. lamottei

Binomial name
- Acracona lamottei (Marion, 1954)

Synonyms
- Munroei lamottei Marion, 1954

Species of moth

Acracona lamottei is a species of snout moth in the genus Acracona. It was described by Hubert Marion in 1954 and is known from Guinea.
