= Afrasura pallescens =

Scientific classification
- Kingdom: Animalia
- Phylum: Arthropoda
- Clade: Pancrustacea
- Class: Insecta
- Order: Lepidoptera
- Superfamily: Noctuoidea
- Family: Erebidae
- Subfamily: Arctiinae
- Genus: Afrasura
- Species: A. pallescens

Binomial name
- Afrasura pallescens Durante, 2009

Species of moth

Afrasura pallescens is a moth of the subfamily Arctiinae which is endemic to Guinea.
