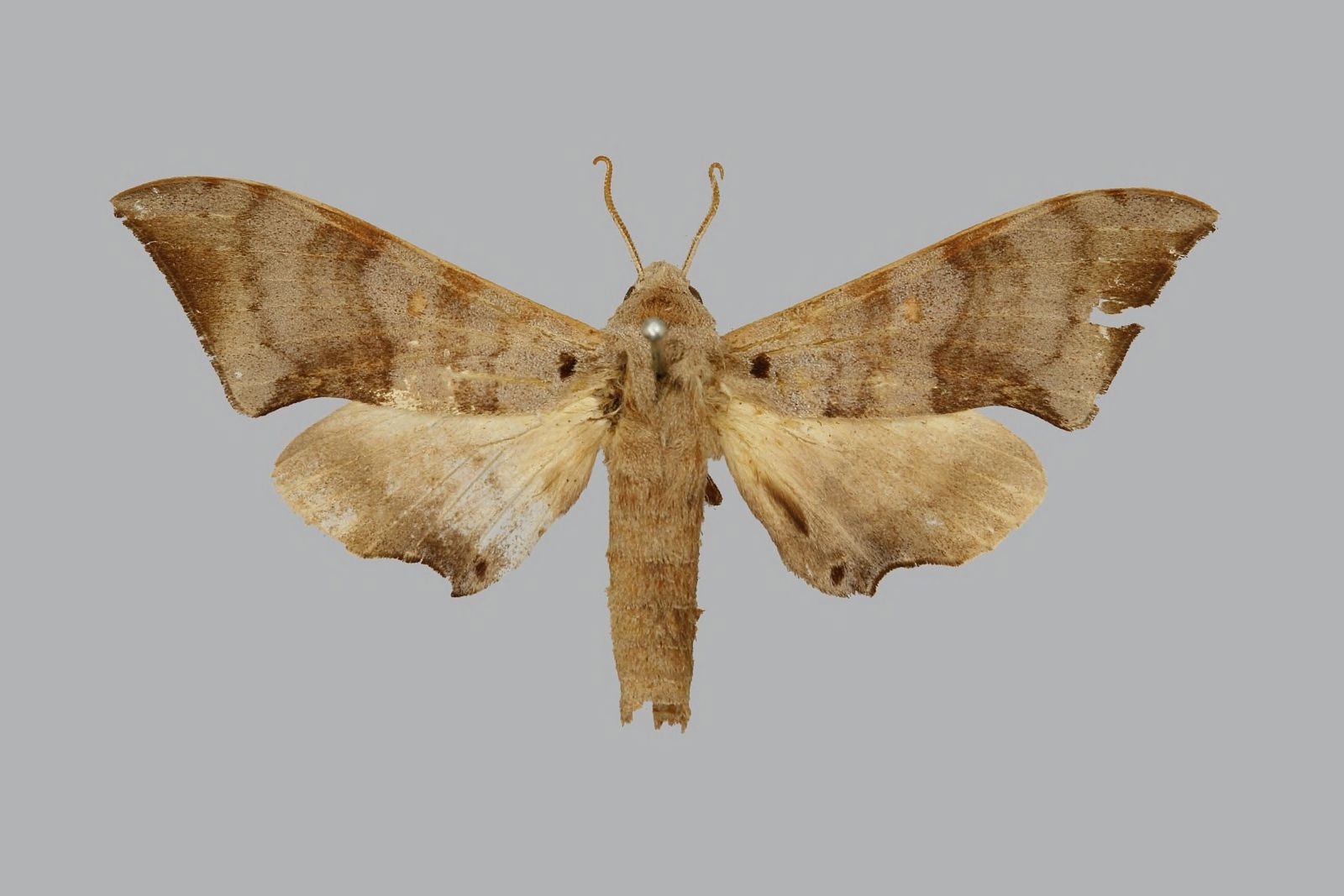

Scientific classification
- Kingdom: Animalia
- Phylum: Arthropoda
- Class: Insecta
- Order: Lepidoptera
- Family: Sphingidae
- Genus: Neopolyptychus
- Species: N. consimilis

Binomial name
- Neopolyptychus consimilis (Rothschild & Jordan, 1903)

Synonyms
- Polyptychus consimilis Rothschild & Jordan, 1903; Polyptychus belgica Clark, 1926; Polyptychus sudanensis Clark, 1927

= Neopolyptychus consimilis =

Species of moth

Neopolyptychus consimilis is a moth of the family Sphingidae. It is known from Savanna from southern Sudan to the Congo.

The forewing is about 30 mm for males.
