= Afrasura hieroglyphica =

Scientific classification
- Kingdom: Animalia
- Phylum: Arthropoda
- Clade: Pancrustacea
- Class: Insecta
- Order: Lepidoptera
- Superfamily: Noctuoidea
- Family: Erebidae
- Subfamily: Arctiinae
- Genus: Afrasura
- Species: A. hieroglyphica

Binomial name
- Afrasura hieroglyphica (Bethune-Baker, 1911)

Synonyms
- Miltochrista hieroglyphica Bethune-Baker, 1911; Asura hieroglyphica

Species of moth

Afrasura hieroglyphica is a moth of the subfamily Arctiinae first described by George Thomas Bethune-Baker in 1911. It is found in Angola, Cameroon, Guinea, Nigeria and Uganda.
