= Scopula latitans =

Scientific classification
- Kingdom: Animalia
- Phylum: Arthropoda
- Clade: Pancrustacea
- Class: Insecta
- Order: Lepidoptera
- Family: Geometridae
- Genus: Scopula
- Species: S. latitans

Binomial name
- Scopula latitans Prout, 1920

Synonyms
- Acidalia reconditaria Snellen, 1872 (preocc.)

Species of geometer moth in subfamily Sterrhinae

Scopula latitans is a moth of the family Geometridae. It is found in Angola, the Democratic Republic of Congo, Guinea, Kenya, Malawi, South Africa, Tanzania, Gambia and Zimbabwe.
