= List of moths of Australia (Brachodidae) =

Partial list of Australian moths

This is a list of the Australian species of the family Brachodidae. It also acts as an index to the species articles and forms part of the full List of moths of Australia.

== Brachodinae ==
- Euthorybeta ochroplaca Turner, 1913
- Euthorybeta xanthoplaca Turner, 1913
- Miscera ambigua (Turner, 1942)
- Miscera ampla (Turner, 1942)
- Miscera androgyna Turner, 1913
- Miscera basichrysa (Lower, 1916)
- Miscera centropis Meyrick, 1907
- Miscera conspersa (Turner, 1942)
- Miscera desmotoma (Lower, 1896)
- Miscera episcota (Lower, 1903)
- Miscera holodisca Meyrick, 1907
- Miscera homotona (Swinhoe, 1892)
- Miscera isomacha (Meyrick, 1925)
- Miscera leucopis Meyrick, 1907
- Miscera lygropis Turner, 1913
- Miscera mesochrysa (Lower, 1903)
- Miscera micrastra Meyrick, 1907
- Miscera omichleutis Meyrick, 1907
- Miscera orthaula Meyrick, 1907
- Miscera pammelas Turner, 1913
- Miscera resumptana Walker, 1863
- Synechodes coniophora Turner, 1913

== Phycodinae ==
- Nigilgia adjectella Walker, 1863
