= Sagalassa =

Scientific classification
- Kingdom: Animalia
- Phylum: Arthropoda
- Class: Insecta
- Order: Lepidoptera
- Family: Brachodidae
- Genus: Sagalassa; Walker, 1856

Synonyms
- Callatolmis Butler, 1877; Gora Walker, 1862; Jonaca Walker, 1863; Melanoxena Dognin, 1910; Miscera Walker, 1863 (disputed); Polyphlebia Felder, 1874

Genus of moths

Sagalassa is a genus of moths in the family Brachodidae.

== Species ==
- Sagalassa aequalis Walker, 1862
- Sagalassa buprestoides Walker, 1864
- Sagalassa chrysauge Felder, 1875
- Sagalassa coleoptrata Walker, 1854
- Sagalassa cryptoleucella Walker, 1866
- Sagalassa cryptopyrrhella Walker, 1866
- Sagalassa falsissima Dognin, 1910
- Sagalassa lilacina Walsingham
- Sagalassa metallica Walker, 1856
- Sagalassa nephelospila Meyrick, 1912
- Sagalassa orthochorda Meyrick, 1922
- Sagalassa robusta Walker, 1856
- Sagalassa triphaenoides Butler, 1883
- Sagalassa valida Walker, 1856

== Former species ==
- Sagalassa ambigua Turner, 1941
- Sagalassa ampla Turner, 1941
- Sagalassa androgyna Turner, 1913
- Sagalassa basichrysa Lower, 1916
- Sagalassa centropis Meyrick, 1907
- Sagalassa conspersa Turner, 1941
- Sagalassa desmotoma Lower, 1896
- Sagalassa diabolus Felder, 1875
- Sagalassa emplecta Turner, 1941
- Sagalassa episcota Lower, 1903
- Sagalassa eubrachycera Diakonoff, 1967
- Sagalassa heterozyga Turner, 1913
- Sagalassa holodisca Meyrick, 1907
- Sagalassa homotona Swinhoe, 1892
- Sagalassa isomacha Meyrick, 1925
- Sagalassa leucopis Meyrick, 1907
- Sagalassa lygropis Turner, 1913
- Sagalassa mesochrysa Lower, 1903
- Sagalassa micrastra Meyrick, 1907
- Sagalassa omichleutis Meyrick, 1907
- Sagalassa orthaula Meyrick, 1907
- Sagalassa pammelas Turner, 1913
- Sagalassa platysema Meyrick, 1921
- Sagalassa poecilota Turner, 1923
- Sagalassa resumptana Walker, 1863
