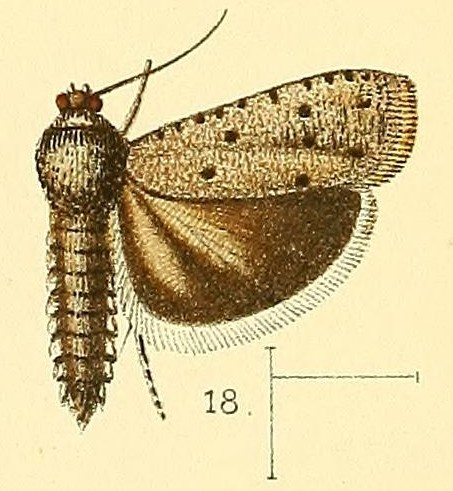
- Phykodes punctata

Scientific classification
- Kingdom: Animalia
- Phylum: Arthropoda
- Class: Insecta
- Order: Lepidoptera
- Family: Brachodidae
- Subfamily: Phycodinae
- Genus: Phykodes; Guenée, 1852

Synonyms
- Tegna Walker, 1866

= Phykodes =

Genus of moths

Phykodes is a genus of moths in the family Brachodidae.

== Species ==
- Phykodes celebica Kallies, 1998
- Phykodes chalcocrossa Meyrick, 1909
- Phykodes chionardis Meyrick, 1909
- Phykodes interstincta Kallies & Arita, 2011
- Phykodes maculata Moore, 1881
- Phycodes minor Moore, 1881
- Phycodes penitis Diakonoff, 1978
- Phycodes punctata Walsingham, 1891
- Phycodes radiata Ochsenheimer, 1808
- Phycodes substriata Walsingham, 1891
- Phycodes taonopa Meyrick, 1909
- Phycodes tortricina Moore, 1881

== Former species ==
- Phycodes adjectella Walker, 1863
- Phycodes albitogata Walsingham, 1891
- Phycodes bushii Arita, 1980
- Phycodes eucallynta Meyrick, 1937
- Phycodes limata Diakonoff & Arita, 1979
- Phycodes mochlophanes Meyrick, 1921
- Phycodes morosa Diakonoff, 1948
- Phycodes omnimicans Diakonoff, 1978
- Phycodes pseliota Meyrick, 1920
- Phycodes seyrigella Viette, 1955
- Phycodes superbella Rebel, 1931
- Phycodes tertiana Diakonoff, 1978
- Phycodes toulgoetella Viette, 1955
- Phycodes venerea Meyrick, 1921
