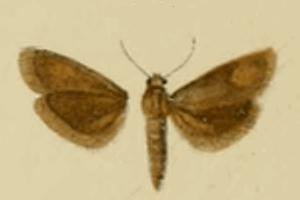

Scientific classification
- Domain: Eukaryota
- Kingdom: Animalia
- Phylum: Arthropoda
- Class: Insecta
- Order: Lepidoptera
- Family: Brachodidae
- Genus: Brachodes
- Species: B. nanetta

Binomial name
- Brachodes nanetta (Oberthür, 1922)

Synonyms
- Atychia nanetta Oberthür, 1922

= Brachodes nanetta =

Species of moth

Brachodes nanetta is a moth of the family Brachodidae. It is found in Portugal, Spain, and Morocco.

The larvae feed on Dactylis glomerata, Agrostis castellana, Celtica gigantea and Festuca ampla. Larval development takes two years.
