= Brachodes albina =

Scientific classification
- Kingdom: Animalia
- Phylum: Arthropoda
- Clade: Pancrustacea
- Class: Insecta
- Order: Lepidoptera
- Family: Brachodidae
- Genus: Brachodes
- Species: B. albina

Binomial name
- Brachodes albina (Zagulajev, 1978)

Synonyms
- Atychia albina Zagulajev, 1978

Species of moth

Brachodes albina is a moth of the family Brachodidae. It is found in Russia.

== Taxonomy ==
The taxonomic status of this species is unclear, it is possibly a synonym of Brachodes lucida.
