= Atractoceros xanthoprocta =

Scientific classification
- Kingdom: Animalia
- Phylum: Arthropoda
- Class: Insecta
- Order: Lepidoptera
- Family: Brachodidae
- Genus: Atractoceros
- Species: A. xanthoprocta

Binomial name
- Atractoceros xanthoprocta (Meyrick, 1914)

Synonyms
- Phycodes xanthoprocta Meyrick, 1914

Species of moth

Atractoceros xanthoprocta is a moth in the family Brachodidae. It was described by Edward Meyrick in 1914. It is found in Malawi and Mozambique.
