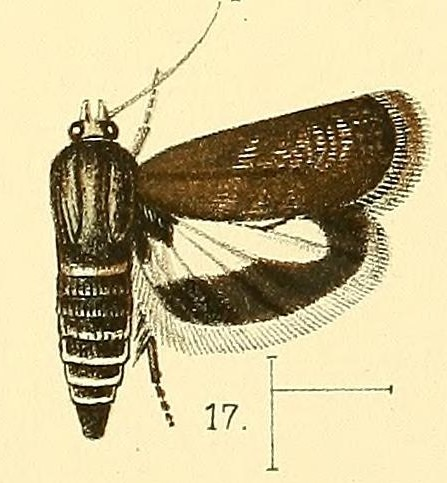
- Archaeotychia albiciliata

Scientific classification
- Kingdom: Animalia
- Phylum: Arthropoda
- Class: Insecta
- Order: Lepidoptera
- Family: Brachodidae
- Subfamily: Brachodinae
- Genus: Archaeotychia; Kallies, 2016

Type species
- Atychia quiris Felder & Rogenhofer, 1875

= Archaeotychia =

Genus of moth

Archaeotychia is a genus of moth in the family Brachiodidae found in Sub-Saharan Africa. It currently contains 7 species. It is closely related to the genus Brachodes; however they can be differentiated by differences in the female genitalia.

== Species ==
- Archaeotychia albiciliata (Walsingham, 1891)
- Archaeotychia dentata Kallies, 2016
- Archaeotychia dicksoni Kallies, 2016
- Archaeotychia khoisanorum Kallies, 2016
- Archaeotychia krooni Kallies, 2016
- Archaeotychia metaspila (Meyrick, 1926)
- Archaeotychia quiris (Felder & Rogenhofer, 1875)
- Archaeotychia semicuprea Kallies, 2016
