= Brachodes staudingeri =

Scientific classification
- Domain: Eukaryota
- Kingdom: Animalia
- Phylum: Arthropoda
- Class: Insecta
- Order: Lepidoptera
- Family: Brachodidae
- Genus: Brachodes
- Species: B. staudingeri

Binomial name
- Brachodes staudingeri Kallies, 1998

Species of moth

Brachodes staudingeri is a moth of the family Brachodidae. It is found from European Russia to the eastern Palearctic realm, including Kyrgyzstan, the mountains of south-eastern Kazakhstan and north-western China.

The wingspan is about 31 mm for males and 22.5 mm for females. The forewings are grey with whitish-yellow scales. The hindwings are uniform grey. Adults have been recorded on wing from April to July.

== Taxonomy ==
Records of Brachodes fallax from the European part of Russia as well as the eastern Palearctic ecozone were identified as a distinct species (Brachodes staudingeri) in 1998.
