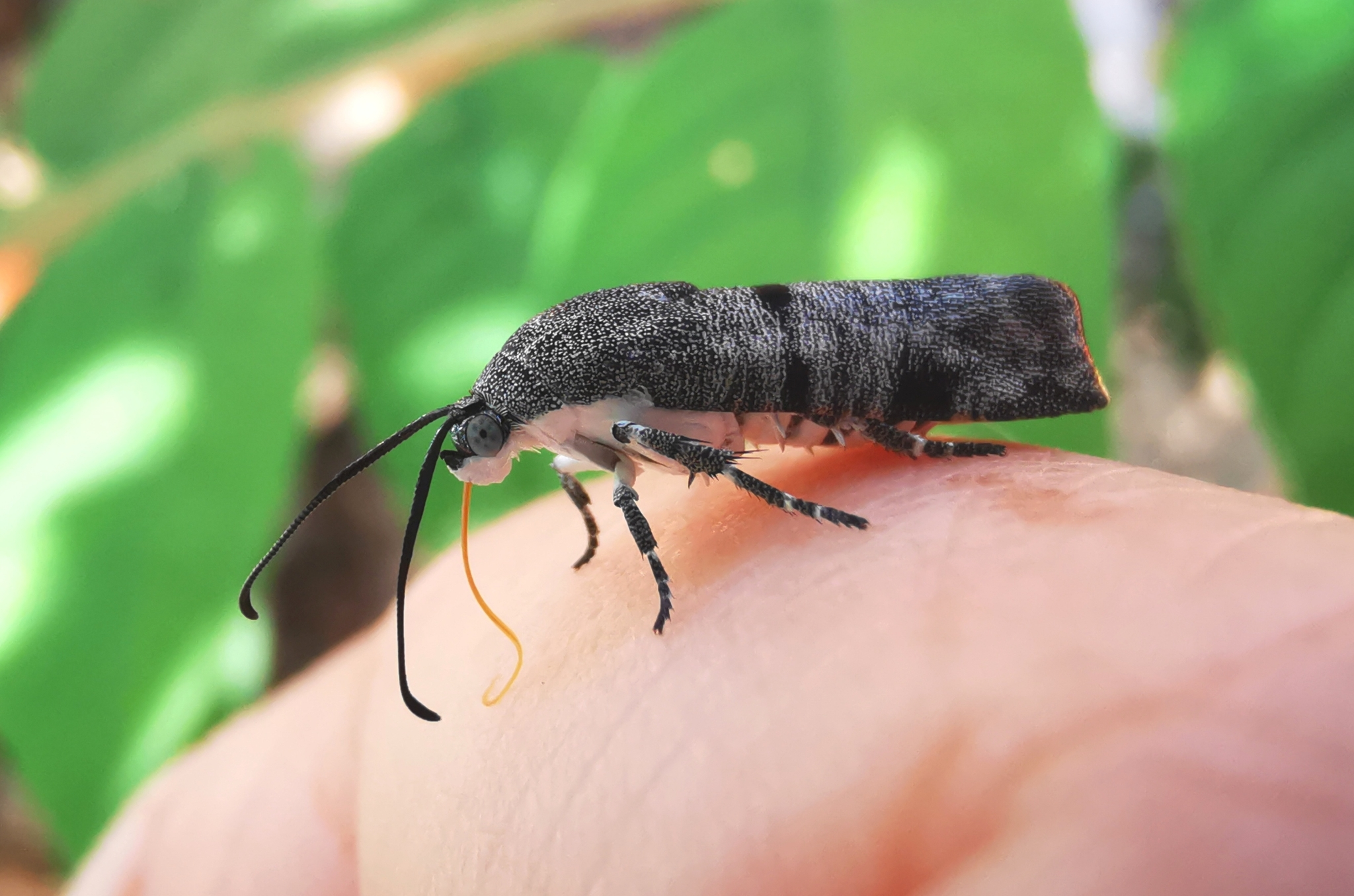
- An adult fig leaf roller, Wat Phrathat Doi Kham, Thailand.

Scientific classification
- Kingdom: Animalia
- Phylum: Arthropoda
- Clade: Pancrustacea
- Class: Insecta
- Order: Lepidoptera
- Family: Brachodidae
- Genus: Phykodes
- Species: P. radiata

Binomial name
- Phycodes radiata (Ochsenheimer, 1808)

Synonyms
- Chimaera radiata Ochsenheimer, 1808; Phycodes hirudinicornis Guenée, 1852; Tegna hyblaeella Walker, 1866; Phycodes tertiana Diakonoff, 1978

= Phycodes radiata =

Species of moth

Phycodes radiata, or fig leaf roller, is a moth in the family Brachodidae. It was described by Ochsenheimer in 1808. It is found in Pakistan, Afghanistan, Nepal, India and Sri Lanka.

== Morphology ==
The alar expanse of this species is 20.43 mm ± 0.58 for males and 24.27 mm ± 0.90 for females.

The head is characterized by smooth-scaled frons, well-developed haustellum, obsolete maxillary palpi, and a three-segmented upcurved labial palpus. The first two segments are broad with white flat scales, while the third is covered in blackish-grey scales. Large ocelli are visible. Antennae are filiform, reaching half the costa of the forewing, and covered with grey scales.

Legs are covered in white and grey scales with epiphysis on fore tibia and tibial spurs: one pair on the midleg, two pairs on the hind leg, sharp spines on tibia and tarsi. The thorax/abdominal dorsal surface are covered in grey scales, and the abdomen shows five fine yellow dorsal bands. The ventral surface is covered in white scales.

The forewing is blackish, with darker markings. The hindwing is dark brown with yellow markings on margins and center. Forewing veins Sc, R1-R5 and M1-M3 rise separately from the discal cell. Cu veins and hindwing veins are also uniquely differentiated into structural patterns.

Male genitalia are characterized by a weakly sclerotized uncus, a bifurcate valvae with a sclerotized spine at the apex, a well-developed vinculum, a partially developed saccus, a short and stout aedeagus, and no cornutus. Female genitalia are characterized by long anal papillae with setae, a symmetrical ostium extending to the middle, long and narrow ductus bursae, a spherical corpus bursae with a single triangular-shaped signum, and a present appendix bursae.

Phycodes radiata can be distinguished from the similar Phycodes penitis by its well-developed signum in female genitalia and the longer, apex-reaching valval extensions in male genitalia.

== Ecology ==
The fig leaf roller is an defoliator pest of Ficus species, reported in South and Southeast Asia, including Myanmar, Sri Lanka, India, and Pakistan. A variety of host plants have been documented, including Ficus glomerata, F. religiosa, F. carica, F. bengalensis, F. indica, F. tisela, and Paulownia sp. (Scrophulariaceae).

In New Delhi, P. radiata larvae were observed causing significant damage to ornamental fig (F. benjamina var. nuda) hedges in 2008 and 2009, marking the first record of infestation on this plant.

Eggs are laid individually on the underside of young leaves, with an average of 3.01 eggs per leaf. The eggs are brown, elongate, and hatch within 7 days. Early instars feed gregariously, initially on the undersides of leaves within silken webs. As they grow, they start feeding on both leaf surfaces. Later instars feed individually, still within silken webs, primarily on mesophyll tissue and occasionally the upper epidermis. Infested leaves turn yellow, dry out, and may wither. The petiole may also be damaged. When disturbed, larvae release a greenish-yellow liquid.

Pupation occurs between leaves in a stout, oval-shaped cocoon made of silk. Pupae are dark brown, with males having dorsal spines on abdominal segments 2–7, and females on segments 2–6. Pupation lasts around 9–10 days.

Adult moths feed on flowers of Cucurbitaceae plants, such as bitter gourd and bottle gourd, during the day.

The fig leaf roller is known to host four parasitoid wasp species from three families, including Chalcididae and Eulophidae. Two species known to parasitize the fig leaf roller are Psilochalcis ceratoniae and Goryphus nursei.

== Life cycle and development ==
The life stages and development of the fig leaf roller have been studied in detail.

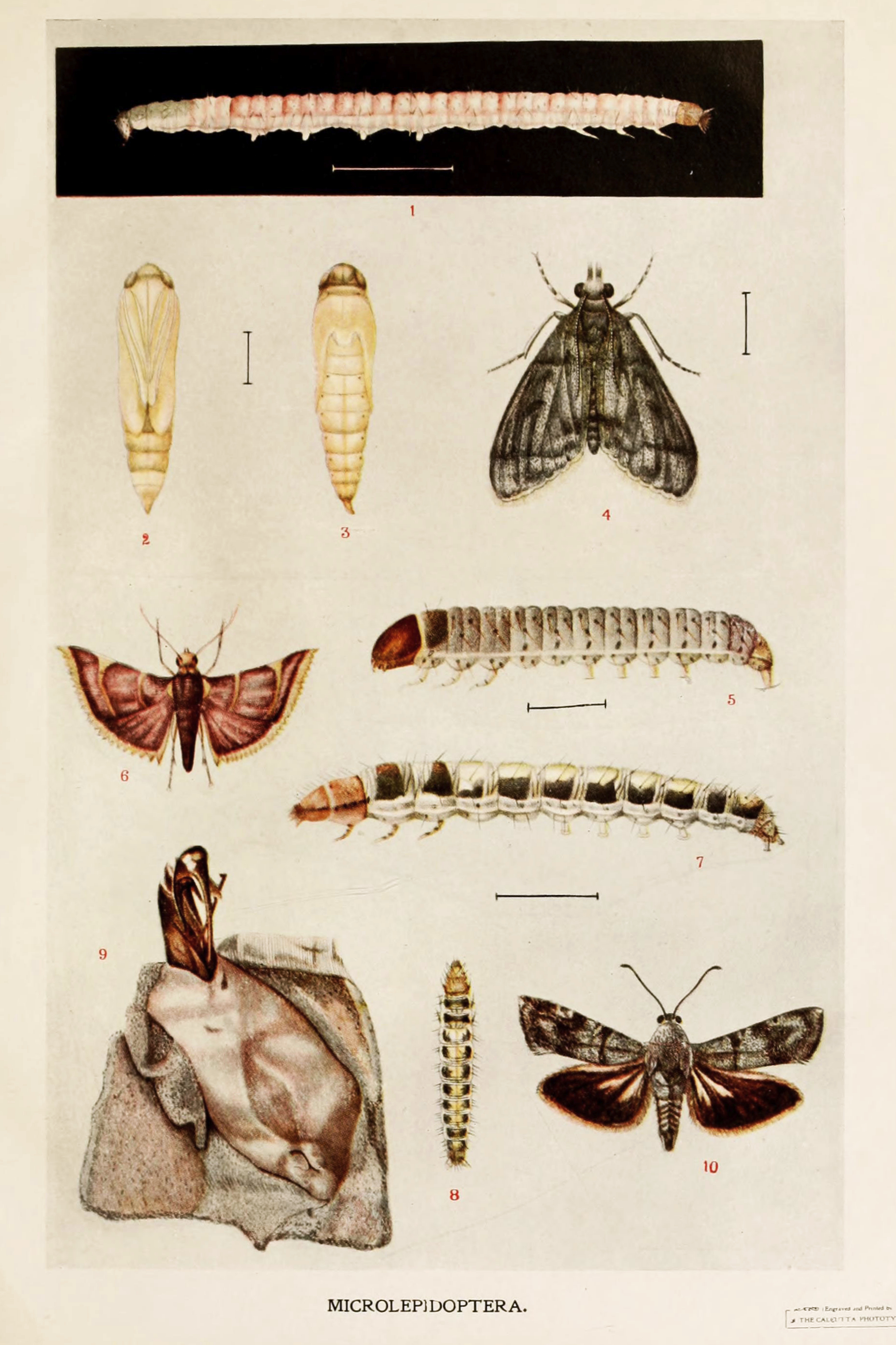
Fig.7-10: Phycodes radiata

Eggs: Eggs measure approximately 0.35 mm in length and 0.08 mm in breadth, with an incubation period of ~6.8 days. On average, hatching success is 84.9%.

Larval Instars: The larvae undergo five instars:

- 1st instar: ~6.4 mm long, lasts ~4.4 days.
- 2nd instar: ~9.7 mm long, lasts ~3.8 days.
- 3rd instar: ~15.1 mm long, lasts ~3.8 days.
- 4th instar: ~20.5 mm long, lasts ~3.4 days.
- 5th instar: ~28.3 mm long, lasts ~4.5 days.

Pupal Stage: Male pupae are ~10.6 mm long and females ~11.1 mm. The pupal stage lasts ~9.7 days for both sexes.

Adults: Males measure ~8.2 mm in body length with a wingspan of ~20.4 mm and live ~5.8 days. Females are slightly larger, ~9.2 mm in body length with a wingspan of ~24.3 mm, and live ~7.9 days.
