= S. exigua =

S. exigua may refer to:

- Salix exigua, a willow native to North America
- Scirpus exigua, a spikesedge with a long stem
- Scopula exigua, a grass moth
- Selliera exigua, a flowering plant
- Sertularella exigua, a thecate hydroid
- Slackia exigua, a gram-positive bacterium
- Solariella exigua, a sea snail
- Somena exigua, a Sri Lankan moth
- Sophora exigua, a plant that releases Sophoraflavanone G into its environment
- Sphenoptera exigua, a jewel beetle
- Spodoptera exigua, an owlet moth
- Stelis exigua, a leach orchid
- Stenelmis exigua, a riffle beetle
- Stephanomeria exigua, a plant native to the western United States
- Synechodes exigua, a little bear moth
