= Nigilgia anactis =

Scientific classification
- Domain: Eukaryota
- Kingdom: Animalia
- Phylum: Arthropoda
- Class: Insecta
- Order: Lepidoptera
- Family: Brachodidae
- Genus: Nigilgia
- Species: N. anactis

Binomial name
- Nigilgia anactis Diakonoff, 1982

Synonyms
- Nigilgia limata anactis Diakonoff & Arita, 1979

Species of moth

Nigilgia anactis is a moth in the family Brachodidae. It was described by Alexey Diakonoff in 1982. It is found in Sri Lanka.

== Description ==
The wingspan of the adult is 12 mm. Both sexes are alike. Head deep dull gray. Antenna black. Thorax deep dull gray. Abdomen dull gray with a silvery gloss. Venter whitish. Forewings oblong suboval. Apex and termen round. Forewings are blackish with white scales. Broad velvety-black transverse bands present along both sides. A submarginal golden scaly thick streak present. A golden dot visible above end of fold. Cilia purple. Hindwings dark purple. Cilia fuscous with dark gray around the apex.
