= Brachodes nana =

Scientific classification
- Kingdom: Animalia
- Phylum: Arthropoda
- Class: Insecta
- Order: Lepidoptera
- Family: Brachodidae
- Genus: Brachodes
- Species: B. nana

Binomial name
- Brachodes nana (Treitschke, 1834)

Synonyms
- Chimaera nana Treitschke, 1834

Species of moth

Brachodes nana is a moth of the family Brachodidae. It is found in Albania, Croatia, North Macedonia, Greece and on Sicily.
