= Phykodes celebica =

Scientific classification
- Kingdom: Animalia
- Phylum: Arthropoda
- Class: Insecta
- Order: Lepidoptera
- Family: Brachodidae
- Genus: Phykodes
- Species: P. celebica

Binomial name
- Phykodes celebica Kallies, 1998

Species of moth

Phykodes celebica is a moth in the family Brachodidae. It was described by Kallies in 1998. It is found on Sulawesi.
