= Brachodes bellicosus =

Scientific classification
- Kingdom: Animalia
- Phylum: Arthropoda
- Class: Insecta
- Order: Lepidoptera
- Family: Brachodidae
- Genus: Brachodes
- Species: B. bellicosus

Binomial name
- Brachodes bellicosus Kallies, 1998

Species of moth

Brachodes bellicosus is a moth of the family Brachodidae. It is found in north-western India and eastern Afghanistan.

The wingspan is about 24 mm. The forewings are grey with whitish scales. The hindwings are greyish brown.
