= Brachodes compar =

Scientific classification
- Kingdom: Animalia
- Phylum: Arthropoda
- Class: Insecta
- Order: Lepidoptera
- Family: Brachodidae
- Genus: Brachodes
- Species: B. compar

Binomial name
- Brachodes compar (Staudinger, 1879)

Synonyms
- Atychia compar Staudinger, 1879

Species of moth

Brachodes compar is a moth of the family Brachodidae. It is found in Croatia, Greece and the Near East.

The wingspan is about 24 mm. The forewings are yellowish brown and the hindwings are white.
