= Saccocera miangkabau =

Scientific classification
- Domain: Eukaryota
- Kingdom: Animalia
- Phylum: Arthropoda
- Class: Insecta
- Order: Lepidoptera
- Family: Brachodidae
- Genus: Saccocera
- Species: S. miangkabau

Binomial name
- Saccocera miangkabau Kallies, 2013

Species of moth

Saccocera miangkabau is a moth in the family Brachodidae. It was described by Kallies in 2013. It is found on Sumatra.
