= Brachodes funebris =

Scientific classification
- Domain: Eukaryota
- Kingdom: Animalia
- Phylum: Arthropoda
- Class: Insecta
- Order: Lepidoptera
- Family: Brachodidae
- Genus: Brachodes
- Species: B. funebris

Binomial name
- Brachodes funebris (Feisthamel, 1833)

Synonyms
- Chimaera funebris Feisthamel, 1833; Myleois cassandrella Staudinger, 1859; Atychia gaditana Rambur, 1866; Atychia pusilla Boisduval, 1875; Brachodes vernetella Guenée, 1845

Species of moth

Brachodes funebris is a moth of the family Brachodidae. It is found in southwestern Europe (France, Portugal and Spain).
