= Brachodes infanda =

Scientific classification
- Kingdom: Animalia
- Phylum: Arthropoda
- Class: Insecta
- Order: Lepidoptera
- Family: Brachodidae
- Genus: Brachodes
- Species: B. infanda

Binomial name
- Brachodes infanda (Meyrick, 1920)

Synonyms
- Atychia infanda Meyrick, 1920

Species of moth

Brachodes infanda is a moth of the family Brachodidae. It is found in South Africa.
