= Sagalassa cryptopyrrhella =

Scientific classification
- Kingdom: Animalia
- Phylum: Arthropoda
- Class: Insecta
- Order: Lepidoptera
- Family: Brachodidae
- Genus: Sagalassa
- Species: S. cryptopyrrhella

Binomial name
- Sagalassa cryptopyrrhella Walker, 1866

Species of moth

Sagalassa cryptopyrrhella is a species of moths in the family Brachodidae. It was described by Francis Walker in 1866. It is found in Brazil. They are nocturnal.
