= Paranigilgia mariannae =

Scientific classification
- Domain: Eukaryota
- Kingdom: Animalia
- Phylum: Arthropoda
- Class: Insecta
- Order: Lepidoptera
- Family: Brachodidae
- Genus: Paranigilgia
- Species: P. mariannae

Binomial name
- Paranigilgia mariannae Kallies, 2013

Species of moth

Paranigilgia mariannae is a moth in the family Brachodidae. It was described by Kallies in 2013. It is found on Sulawesi.
