= Brachodes anatolicus =

Scientific classification
- Kingdom: Animalia
- Phylum: Arthropoda
- Class: Insecta
- Order: Lepidoptera
- Family: Brachodidae
- Genus: Brachodes
- Species: B. anatolicus

Binomial name
- Brachodes anatolicus Kallies, 2001

Species of moth

Brachodes anatolicus is a moth of the family Brachodidae. It is found in the Sivas Province in Turkey.
