= Synechodes rubroris =

Scientific classification
- Domain: Eukaryota
- Kingdom: Animalia
- Phylum: Arthropoda
- Class: Insecta
- Order: Lepidoptera
- Family: Brachodidae
- Genus: Synechodes
- Species: S. rubroris

Binomial name
- Synechodes rubroris Kallies, 1998

Species of moth

Synechodes rubroris is a moth in the family Brachodidae. It was described by Kallies in 1998. It is found on Sulawesi.
