= Sagalassa metallica =

Scientific classification
- Kingdom: Animalia
- Phylum: Arthropoda
- Class: Insecta
- Order: Lepidoptera
- Family: Brachodidae
- Genus: Sagalassa
- Species: S. metallica

Binomial name
- Sagalassa metallica Walker, 1856

Species of moth

Sagalassa metallica is a moth in the family Brachodidae. It was described by Francis Walker in 1856. It is found in Brazil.
