= Sagalassa aequalis =

Scientific classification
- Kingdom: Animalia
- Phylum: Arthropoda
- Class: Insecta
- Order: Lepidoptera
- Family: Brachodidae
- Genus: Sagalassa
- Species: S. aequalis

Binomial name
- Sagalassa aequalis Walker, 1862

Species of moth

Sagalassa aequalis is a moth in the family Brachodidae. It was described by Francis Walker in 1862. It is found in Brazil.
