= Synechodes andamanensis =

Scientific classification
- Domain: Eukaryota
- Kingdom: Animalia
- Phylum: Arthropoda
- Class: Insecta
- Order: Lepidoptera
- Family: Brachodidae
- Genus: Synechodes
- Species: S. andamanensis

Binomial name
- Synechodes andamanensis Kallies, 2004

Species of moth

Synechodes andamanensis is a moth in the family Brachodidae. It was described by Kallies in 2004. It is found on the Andamans (India).

The wingspan is about 19 mm.

== Etymology ==
The species name refers to the type locality.
