= Brachodes flavescens =

Scientific classification
- Kingdom: Animalia
- Phylum: Arthropoda
- Class: Insecta
- Order: Lepidoptera
- Family: Brachodidae
- Genus: Brachodes
- Species: B. flavescens

Binomial name
- Brachodes flavescens (Turati, 1919)

Synonyms
- Atychia flavescens Turati, 1919

Species of moth

Brachodes flavescens is a moth of the family Brachodidae. It is found in Italy.
