= Synechodes fulvoris =

Scientific classification
- Domain: Eukaryota
- Kingdom: Animalia
- Phylum: Arthropoda
- Class: Insecta
- Order: Lepidoptera
- Family: Brachodidae
- Genus: Synechodes
- Species: S. fulvoris

Binomial name
- Synechodes fulvoris Kallies, 1998

Species of moth

Synechodes fulvoris is a moth in the family Brachodidae. It was described by Kallies in 1998. It is found on Sulawesi.
