= Sagalassa triphaenoides =

Scientific classification
- Kingdom: Animalia
- Phylum: Arthropoda
- Class: Insecta
- Order: Lepidoptera
- Family: Brachodidae
- Genus: Sagalassa
- Species: S. triphaenoides

Binomial name
- Sagalassa triphaenoides (Butler, 1883)

Synonyms
- Atychia triphaenoides Butler, 1883

Species of moth

Sagalassa triphaenoides is a moth in the family Brachodidae. It is found in Chile.
