= Sagalassa buprestoides =

Scientific classification
- Kingdom: Animalia
- Phylum: Arthropoda
- Class: Insecta
- Order: Lepidoptera
- Family: Brachodidae
- Genus: Sagalassa
- Species: S. buprestoides

Binomial name
- Sagalassa buprestoides Walker, 1864

Synonyms
- Polyphlebia atychioides Felder, 1874

Species of moth

Sagalassa buprestoides is a moth in the family Brachodidae. It was described by Francis Walker in 1864. It is found in Brazil.
