= Brachodes flagellatus =

Scientific classification
- Kingdom: Animalia
- Phylum: Arthropoda
- Class: Insecta
- Order: Lepidoptera
- Family: Brachodidae
- Genus: Brachodes
- Species: B. flagellatus

Binomial name
- Brachodes flagellatus Kallies, 2002

Species of moth

Brachodes flagellatus is a moth of the family Brachodidae which is endemic to Tibet.
