= Brachodes rasata =

Scientific classification
- Kingdom: Animalia
- Phylum: Arthropoda
- Class: Insecta
- Order: Lepidoptera
- Family: Brachodidae
- Genus: Brachodes
- Species: B. rasata

Binomial name
- Brachodes rasata Staudinger, 1900

Species of moth

Brachodes rasata is a moth of the family Brachodidae. It is found in Tajikistan.
