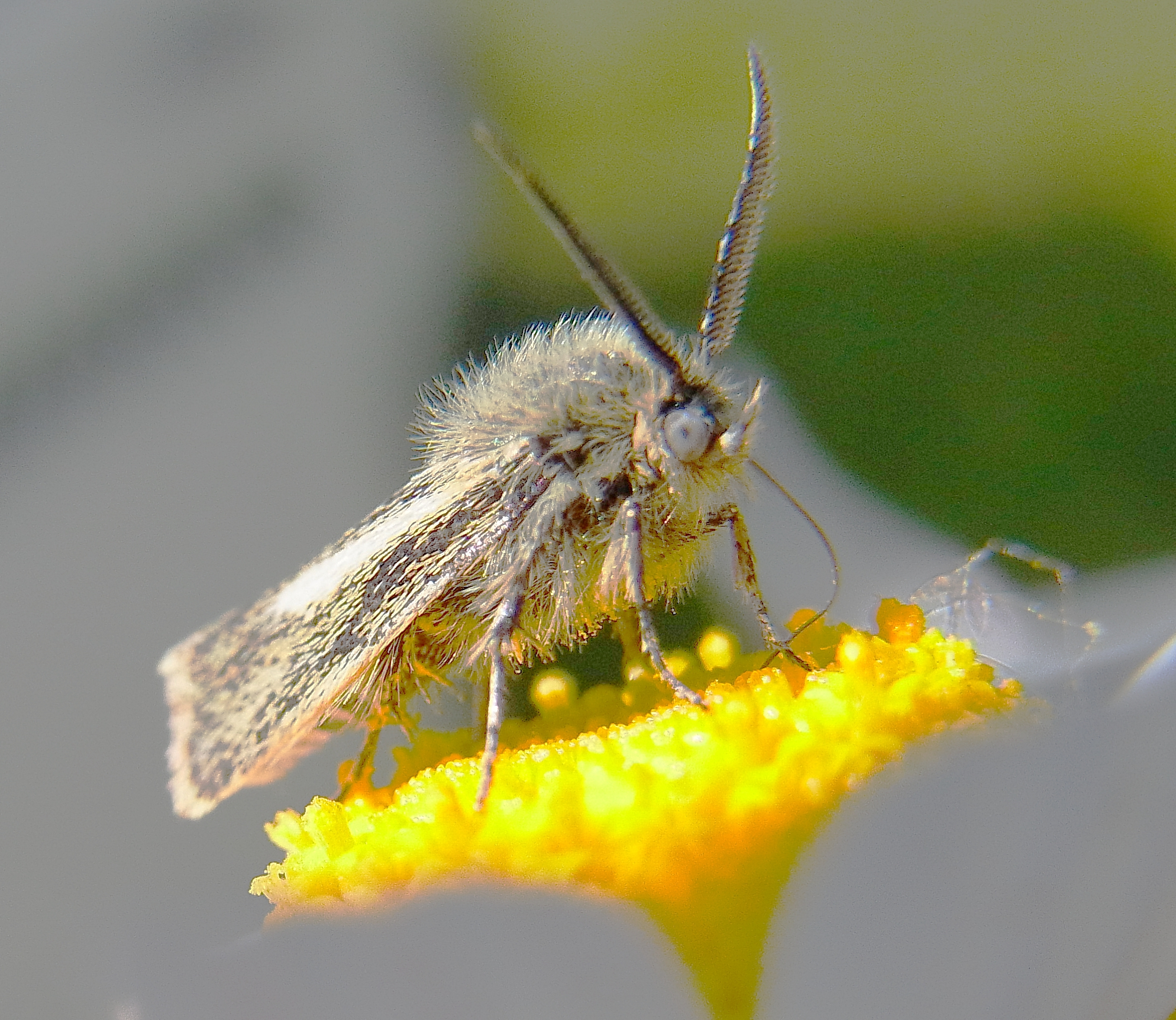

Scientific classification
- Domain: Eukaryota
- Kingdom: Animalia
- Phylum: Arthropoda
- Class: Insecta
- Order: Lepidoptera
- Family: Brachodidae
- Genus: Brachodes
- Species: B. appendiculata

Binomial name
- Brachodes appendiculata (Esper, 1783)

Synonyms
- Sphinx appendiculata Esper, 1783; Sphinx chimaera Hübner, 1796; Pyralis saldonana Fabricius, 1787; Pyralis vahiliana Fabricius, 1787; Atychia appendiculata Meyrick, 1912

= Brachodes appendiculata =

Species of moth

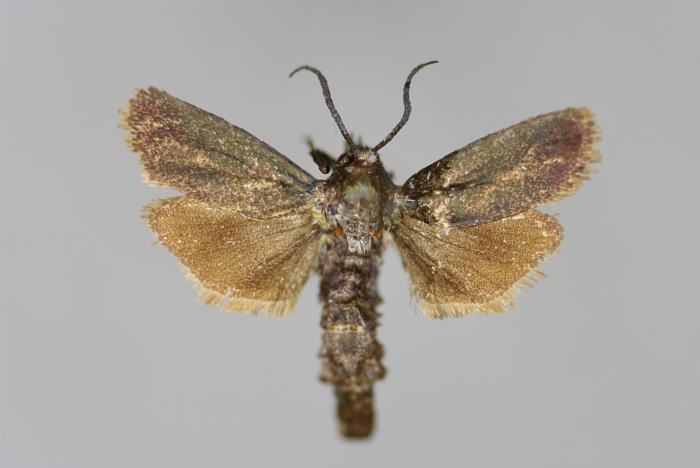
Brachodes appendiculata

Brachodes appendiculata is a moth of the family Brachodidae. It is found in Austria, the Czech Republic, Slovakia, Slovenia, former Yugoslavia, Hungary, Italy, Romania, Ukraine, Russia and the Near East.

The wingspan is about 24 mm. The forewings are yellowish brown and the hindwings are white.

The larvae have been recorded feeding on Festuca ovina.
