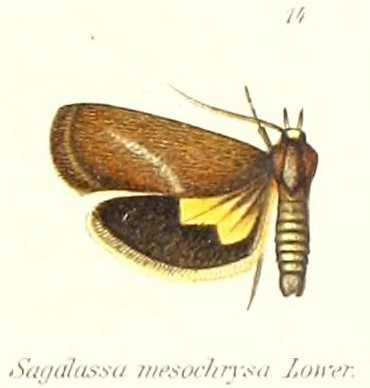
- Miscera mesochrysa

Scientific classification
- Kingdom: Animalia
- Phylum: Arthropoda
- Class: Insecta
- Order: Lepidoptera
- Family: Brachodidae
- Subfamily: Brachodinae
- Genus: Miscera; Walker, 1863

Species
- See text

= Miscera =

Genus of moths

Miscera is a genus of moths in the family Brachodidae.

== Species ==
- Miscera ambigua (Turner, 1942) (Australia)
- Miscera ampla (Turner, 1942) (Australia)
- Miscera androgyna Turner, 1913 (Australia)
- Miscera basichrysa (Lower, 1916) (Australia)
  - Miscera basichrysa extensa Kallies, 1998 (New Guinea)
- Miscera centropis Meyrick, 1907 (Australia)
- Miscera conspersa (Turner, 1942) (Australia)
- Miscera desmotoma (Lower, 1896) (Australia)
- Miscera dohertyi Kallies, 1998 (Assam: India)
- Miscera episcota (Lower, 1903) (Australia)
- Miscera eubrachycera (Diakonoff, [1968]) (the Philippines)
- Miscera holodisca Meyrick, 1907 (Australia)
- Miscera homotona (Swinhoe, 1892) (Australia)
- Miscera isomacha (Meyrick, 1925) (Australia)
- Miscera leucopis Meyrick, 1907 (Australia)
- Miscera lygropis Turner, 1913 (Australia)
- Miscera mesochrysa (Lower, 1903) (Australia)
- Miscera micrastra Meyrick, 1907 (Australia)
- Miscera minahasa Kallies, 2013 (Sulawesi)
- Miscera omichleutis Meyrick, 1907 (Australia)
- Miscera orthaula Meyrick, 1907 (Australia)
- Miscera pammelas Turner, 1913 (Australia)
- Miscera resumptana Walker, 1863 (Australia)

== Former species ==
- Miscera orpheus Kallies, 2004
- Miscera sauteri Kallies, 2004
