= Synechodes polias =

Scientific classification
- Domain: Eukaryota
- Kingdom: Animalia
- Phylum: Arthropoda
- Class: Insecta
- Order: Lepidoptera
- Family: Brachodidae
- Genus: Synechodes
- Species: S. polias

Binomial name
- Synechodes polias Kallies, 2013

Species of moth

Synechodes polias is a moth in the family Brachodidae. It was described by Kallies in 2013. It is found on Sulawesi.
