= Brachodes canonitis =

Scientific classification
- Kingdom: Animalia
- Phylum: Arthropoda
- Class: Insecta
- Order: Lepidoptera
- Family: Brachodidae
- Genus: Brachodes
- Species: B. canonitis

Binomial name
- Brachodes canonitis (Meyrick, 1906)

Synonyms
- Palamernis canonitis Meyrick, 1906

Species of moth

Brachodes canonitis is a moth in the family Brachodidae. It was described by Edward Meyrick in 1906. It is found in the Himalayas.

The wingspan is 22–24 mm. The forewings are brownish or pale fuscous, irrorated (sprinkled) with dark fuscous. The submedian fold is sometimes obscurely whitish from the base to the middle. The hindwings are rather dark fuscous, lighter anteriorly, sometimes with an obscure streak of whitish suffusion from the base to the middle of the disc.
