= Sagalassa lilacina =

Scientific classification
- Domain: Eukaryota
- Kingdom: Animalia
- Phylum: Arthropoda
- Class: Insecta
- Order: Lepidoptera
- Family: Brachodidae
- Genus: Sagalassa
- Species: S. lilacina

Binomial name
- Sagalassa lilacina Walsingham

Species of moth

Sagalassa lilacina is a moth in the family Brachodidae. It was described by Walsingham. It is found in Central America.
