= Brachodes gressitti =

Scientific classification
- Kingdom: Animalia
- Phylum: Arthropoda
- Clade: Pancrustacea
- Class: Insecta
- Order: Lepidoptera
- Family: Brachodidae
- Genus: Brachodes
- Species: B. gressitti

Binomial name
- Brachodes gressitti Heppner, 2009

Species of moth

Brachodes gressitti is a moth of the family Brachodidae that is endemic to Chinese province of Hainan.
