= Nigilgia talhouki =

Scientific classification
- Domain: Eukaryota
- Kingdom: Animalia
- Phylum: Arthropoda
- Class: Insecta
- Order: Lepidoptera
- Family: Brachodidae
- Genus: Nigilgia
- Species: N. talhouki

Binomial name
- Nigilgia talhouki Diakonoff, 1984

Species of moth

Nigilgia talhouki is a moth in the family Brachodidae. It was described by Alexey Diakonoff in 1984. It is found in Saudi Arabia.

The larvae feed on Ficus pseudosycomorus.
