= Sagalassa coleoptrata =

Scientific classification
- Kingdom: Animalia
- Phylum: Arthropoda
- Class: Insecta
- Order: Lepidoptera
- Family: Brachodidae
- Genus: Sagalassa
- Species: S. coleoptrata

Binomial name
- Sagalassa coleoptrata Walker, 1854

Species of moth

Sagalassa coleoptrata is a moth in the family Brachodidae. It was described by Francis Walker in 1854. It is found in Brazil.
