= Brachodes rhagensis =

Scientific classification
- Kingdom: Animalia
- Phylum: Arthropoda
- Class: Insecta
- Order: Lepidoptera
- Family: Brachodidae
- Genus: Brachodes
- Species: B. rhagensis

Binomial name
- Brachodes rhagensis (Lederer, 1870)

Synonyms
- Atychia rhagensis Lederer, 1870

Species of moth

Brachodes rhagensis is a moth of the family Brachodidae. It is found in Iran.

The wingspan is about 29 mm for males and 24 mm for females.
