= Nigilgia violacea =

Scientific classification
- Kingdom: Animalia
- Phylum: Arthropoda
- Clade: Pancrustacea
- Class: Insecta
- Order: Lepidoptera
- Family: Brachodidae
- Genus: Nigilgia
- Species: N. violacea

Binomial name
- Nigilgia violacea Kallies & Arita, 2007

Species of moth

Nigilgia violacea is a moth in the family Brachodidae. It was described by Kallies and Arita in 2007. It is found in China (Guangdong).

The wingspan is 13–15 mm for males and 14.5–17 mm for females.
