= Paranigilgia aritai =

Scientific classification
- Domain: Eukaryota
- Kingdom: Animalia
- Phylum: Arthropoda
- Class: Insecta
- Order: Lepidoptera
- Family: Brachodidae
- Genus: Paranigilgia
- Species: P. aritai

Binomial name
- Paranigilgia aritai Kallies, 1998

Species of moth

Paranigilgia aritai is a moth in the family Brachodidae. It was described by Kallies in 1998. It is found in India (Assam).
