= Miscera dohertyi =

Scientific classification
- Domain: Eukaryota
- Kingdom: Animalia
- Phylum: Arthropoda
- Class: Insecta
- Order: Lepidoptera
- Family: Brachodidae
- Genus: Miscera
- Species: M. dohertyi

Binomial name
- Miscera dohertyi Kallies, 1998

Species of moth

Miscera dohertyi is a moth in the family Brachodidae. It was described by Kallies in 1998. It is found in India (Assam).
