= Brachodes monotona =

Scientific classification
- Kingdom: Animalia
- Phylum: Arthropoda
- Class: Insecta
- Order: Lepidoptera
- Family: Brachodidae
- Genus: Brachodes
- Species: B. monotona

Binomial name
- Brachodes monotona (Amsel, 1953)

Synonyms
- Atychia monotona Amsel, 1953

Species of moth

Brachodes monotona is a moth of the family Brachodidae. It is found in the southern Zagros Mountains of Iran.
