= Sagalassa falsissima =

Scientific classification
- Domain: Eukaryota
- Kingdom: Animalia
- Phylum: Arthropoda
- Class: Insecta
- Order: Lepidoptera
- Family: Brachodidae
- Genus: Sagalassa
- Species: S. falsissima

Binomial name
- Sagalassa falsissima Dognin, 1910

Species of moth

Sagalassa falsissima is a moth in the family Brachodidae. It was described by Paul Dognin in 1910. It is found in Colombia.
