= Brachodes laeta =

Scientific classification
- Kingdom: Animalia
- Phylum: Arthropoda
- Class: Insecta
- Order: Lepidoptera
- Family: Brachodidae
- Genus: Brachodes
- Species: B. laeta

Binomial name
- Brachodes laeta (Staudinger, 1863)

Synonyms
- Atychia laeta Staudinger, 1863

Species of moth

Brachodes laeta is a moth of the family Brachodidae. It is found in France and Spain.

The wingspan is 22–28 mm. The wings of the males are straw yellow, while females have a dark ground colour with yellow markings.
