= Nigilgia diehli =

Scientific classification
- Domain: Eukaryota
- Kingdom: Animalia
- Phylum: Arthropoda
- Class: Insecta
- Order: Lepidoptera
- Family: Brachodidae
- Genus: Nigilgia
- Species: N. diehli

Binomial name
- Nigilgia diehli Kallies, 2000

Species of moth

Nigilgia diehli is a moth in the family Brachodidae. It was described by Kallies in 2000. It is found on Sumatra.
