= Miscera minahasa =

Scientific classification
- Domain: Eukaryota
- Kingdom: Animalia
- Phylum: Arthropoda
- Class: Insecta
- Order: Lepidoptera
- Family: Brachodidae
- Genus: Miscera
- Species: M. minahasa

Binomial name
- Miscera minahasa Kallies, 2013

Species of moth

Miscera minahasa is a moth in the family Brachodidae. It was described by Kallies in 2013. It is found on Sulawesi.
