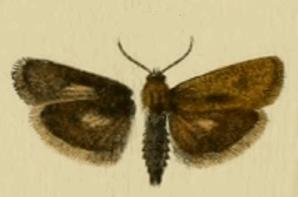

Scientific classification
- Domain: Eukaryota
- Kingdom: Animalia
- Phylum: Arthropoda
- Class: Insecta
- Order: Lepidoptera
- Family: Brachodidae
- Genus: Brachodes
- Species: B. powelli

Binomial name
- Brachodes powelli (Oberthür, 1922)

Synonyms
- Atychia powelli Oberthür, 1922

= Brachodes powelli =

Species of moth

Brachodes powelli is a moth of the family Brachodidae. It is found in Italy, Spain and North Africa.
