= Synechodes lunaris =

Scientific classification
- Kingdom: Animalia
- Phylum: Arthropoda
- Class: Insecta
- Order: Lepidoptera
- Family: Brachodidae
- Genus: Synechodes
- Species: S. lunaris

Binomial name
- Synechodes lunaris Kallies, 2004

Species of moth

Synechodes lunaris is a moth in the family Brachodidae. It was described by Kallies in 2004. It is found in Malaysia.

The wingspan is 17–18 mm. The forewings are black. The hindwings are yellow.

== Etymology ==
The species name refers to the moon-shaped forewing markings.
