= Synechodes royalis =

Scientific classification
- Domain: Eukaryota
- Kingdom: Animalia
- Phylum: Arthropoda
- Class: Insecta
- Order: Lepidoptera
- Family: Brachodidae
- Genus: Synechodes
- Species: S. royalis

Binomial name
- Synechodes royalis Kallies, 2004

Species of moth

Synechodes royalis is a moth in the family Brachodidae. It was described by Kallies in 2004. It is found in Myanmar.
