= Brachodes mesopotamica =

Scientific classification
- Kingdom: Animalia
- Phylum: Arthropoda
- Class: Insecta
- Order: Lepidoptera
- Family: Brachodidae
- Genus: Brachodes
- Species: B. mesopotamica

Binomial name
- Brachodes mesopotamica (Amsel, 1949)

Synonyms
- Atychia mesopotamica Amsel, 1949

Species of moth

Brachodes mesopotamica is a moth of the family Brachodidae. It is found in Turkey and Iraq.
