= Phycodes punctata =

Scientific classification
- Domain: Eukaryota
- Kingdom: Animalia
- Phylum: Arthropoda
- Class: Insecta
- Order: Lepidoptera
- Family: Brachodidae
- Genus: Phycodes
- Species: P. punctata

Binomial name
- Phycodes punctata Walsingham, 1891

Species of moth

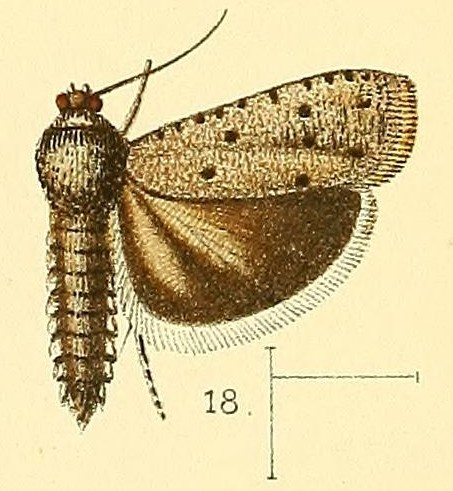
Phycodes punctata

Phycodes punctata is a moth in the family Brachodidae. It was described by Walsingham in 1891. It is found in South Africa.
