= Synechodes agrippina =

Scientific classification
- Kingdom: Animalia
- Phylum: Arthropoda
- Class: Insecta
- Order: Lepidoptera
- Family: Brachodidae
- Genus: Synechodes
- Species: S. agrippina

Binomial name
- Synechodes agrippina (Meyrick, 1930)

Synonyms
- Anticrates agrippina Meyrick, 1930

Species of moth

Synechodes agrippina is a moth in the family Brachodidae. It was described by Edward Meyrick in 1930. It is found on Sulawesi in Indonesia.
