= Brachodes pumila =

Scientific classification
- Domain: Eukaryota
- Kingdom: Animalia
- Phylum: Arthropoda
- Class: Insecta
- Order: Lepidoptera
- Family: Brachodidae
- Genus: Brachodes
- Species: B. pumila

Binomial name
- Brachodes pumila (Ochsenheimer, 1808)

Synonyms
- Atychia pumila Ochsenheimer, 1808; Chimaera pumila; Brachodes pumilus; Noctua chimaera Hübner, [1808]

Species of moth

Brachodes pumila is a moth of the family Brachodidae. It is found from eastern Central Europe to Central Asia, including lower Austria, Slovakia, Hungary, Romania, Bulgaria, Italy, Dalmatia, Croatia, North Macedonia, Greece, southern Russia, Turkey, Syria, Kazakhstan, Kyrgyzstan and north-western China. The habitat consists of lowland steppe and xero-montane grasslands.

The wingspan is 18–22 mm for males and 16–21 mm for females. Adults are day-active and are on wing from June to mid-August.
