= Phykodes interstincta =

Scientific classification
- Kingdom: Animalia
- Phylum: Arthropoda
- Clade: Pancrustacea
- Class: Insecta
- Order: Lepidoptera
- Family: Brachodidae
- Genus: Phykodes
- Species: P. interstincta

Binomial name
- Phykodes interstincta Kallies & Arita, 2011

Species of moth

Phykodes interstincta is a moth in the family Brachodidae. It was described by Kallies and Arita in 2011. It is found in China (Guangdong).
