= Sagalassa orthochorda =

Scientific classification
- Kingdom: Animalia
- Phylum: Arthropoda
- Class: Insecta
- Order: Lepidoptera
- Family: Brachodidae
- Genus: Sagalassa
- Species: S. orthochorda

Binomial name
- Sagalassa orthochorda Meyrick, 1922

Species of moth

Sagalassa orthochorda is a moth in the family Brachodidae. It was described by Edward Meyrick in 1922. It is found in Brazil.

The wingspan is about 18 mm. The forewings are brownish sprinkled with dark fuscous, and somewhat mixed irregularly with ferruginous, especially towards the termen. There is a fine straight whitish line from the costa before two-thirds to the dorsum at two-thirds, slightly interrupted in the middle, preceded by undefined darker suffusion. There is an irregular elongate dark fuscous spot in the disc just beyond this and irregular black streaks between the veins towards the termen, one at the apex strongest. The hindwings are dark fuscous with obscure transverse blotches of brown-whitish suffusion from the costa at one-third and two-thirds, the latter extending to behind the cell.
