= Phykodes maculata =

Scientific classification
- Kingdom: Animalia
- Phylum: Arthropoda
- Class: Insecta
- Order: Lepidoptera
- Family: Brachodidae
- Genus: Phykodes
- Species: P. maculata

Binomial name
- Phykodes maculata Moore, 1881

Species of moth

Phykodes maculata is a moth in the family Brachodidae. It was described by Frederic Moore in 1881. It is found in Assam, India.
