= Synechodes rotanicola =

Scientific classification
- Domain: Eukaryota
- Kingdom: Animalia
- Phylum: Arthropoda
- Class: Insecta
- Order: Lepidoptera
- Family: Brachodidae
- Genus: Synechodes
- Species: S. rotanicola

Binomial name
- Synechodes rotanicola Kallies, 2004

Species of moth

Synechodes rotanicola is a moth in the family Brachodidae. It was described by Kallies in 2004. It is found on Java in Indonesia.

The wingspan is 26 mm for males and 34 mm for females.
