= Brachodes formosa =

Scientific classification
- Kingdom: Animalia
- Phylum: Arthropoda
- Class: Insecta
- Order: Lepidoptera
- Family: Brachodidae
- Genus: Brachodes
- Species: B. formosa

Binomial name
- Brachodes formosa (Amsel, 1954)

Synonyms
- Atychia formosa Amsel, 1954

Species of moth

Brachodes formosa is a moth of the family Brachodidae. It is found in the southern Zagros Mountains of Iran.
