= Nigilgia atribractea =

Scientific classification
- Domain: Eukaryota
- Kingdom: Animalia
- Phylum: Arthropoda
- Class: Insecta
- Order: Lepidoptera
- Family: Brachodidae
- Genus: Nigilgia
- Species: N. atribractea

Binomial name
- Nigilgia atribractea Kallies, 2013

Species of moth

Nigilgia atribractea is a moth in the family Brachodidae. It was described by Kallies in 2013. It is found in Papua New Guinea.
