= Sagalassa robusta =

Scientific classification
- Kingdom: Animalia
- Phylum: Arthropoda
- Class: Insecta
- Order: Lepidoptera
- Family: Brachodidae
- Genus: Sagalassa
- Species: S. robusta

Binomial name
- Sagalassa robusta Walker, 1856

Synonyms
- Acrobasis cryptoleucella Walker, 1866; Sagalassa cryptoleucella

Species of moth

Sagalassa robusta is a moth in the family Brachodidae. It is found in Brazil.
