= Synechodes papuana =

Scientific classification
- Kingdom: Animalia
- Phylum: Arthropoda
- Clade: Pancrustacea
- Class: Insecta
- Order: Lepidoptera
- Family: Brachodidae
- Genus: Synechodes
- Species: S. papuana

Binomial name
- Synechodes papuana Heppner, 1990

Species of moth

Synechodes papuana is a moth in the family Brachodidae. It was described by John B. Heppner in 1990. It is found in New Guinea.
