= Brachodes candefactus =

Scientific classification
- Kingdom: Animalia
- Phylum: Arthropoda
- Class: Insecta
- Order: Lepidoptera
- Family: Brachodidae
- Genus: Brachodes
- Species: B. candefactus

Binomial name
- Brachodes candefactus (Lederer, 1858)

Synonyms
- Atychia candefacta Lederer, 1858; Atychia diacona Lederer, 1858

Species of moth

Brachodes candefactus is a moth of the family Brachodidae. It is found in Syria, Lebanon, Turkey (central and eastern Anatolia) and north-western Iran. The habitat consists of grass steppe in mountainous areas.

The wingspan is 14–20 mm. Adults are day-active and are on wing from the beginning of June to the end of July.

The larvae feed on Secale species.
