= Brachodes beryti =

Scientific classification
- Kingdom: Animalia
- Phylum: Arthropoda
- Class: Insecta
- Order: Lepidoptera
- Family: Brachodidae
- Genus: Brachodes
- Species: B. beryti

Binomial name
- Brachodes beryti (Stainton, 1867)

Synonyms
- Atychia beryti Stainton, 1867

Species of moth

Brachodes beryti is a moth of the family Brachodidae. It is found in Greece and the Near East (Turkey, Lebanon).
