= Brachodes keredjella =

Scientific classification
- Kingdom: Animalia
- Phylum: Arthropoda
- Class: Insecta
- Order: Lepidoptera
- Family: Brachodidae
- Genus: Brachodes
- Species: B. keredjella

Binomial name
- Brachodes keredjella (Amsel, 1953)

Synonyms
- Atychia keredjella Amsel, 1953

Species of moth

Brachodes keredjella is a moth of the family Brachodidae. It is found in the central Elburz Mountains of Iran.
