= Phykodes chionardis =

Scientific classification
- Kingdom: Animalia
- Phylum: Arthropoda
- Class: Insecta
- Order: Lepidoptera
- Family: Brachodidae
- Genus: Phykodes
- Species: P. chionardis

Binomial name
- Phykodes chionardis Meyrick, 1909

Species of moth

Phykodes chionardis is a moth in the family Brachodidae. It was described by Edward Meyrick in 1909. It is found in Sri Lanka.
