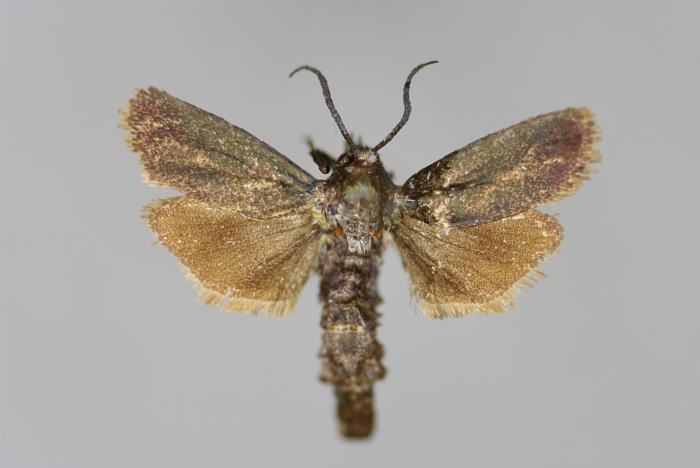
- Brachodes appendiculata

Scientific classification
- Kingdom: Animalia
- Phylum: Arthropoda
- Class: Insecta
- Order: Lepidoptera
- Family: Brachodidae
- Subfamily: Brachodinae
- Genus: Brachodes; Guenée, 1845

Species
- See text

Synonyms
- Chimaera Ochsenheimer, 1808 (preocc.); Atychia Latreille, 1809 (preocc.); Procerata Berthold, 1827; Chimera Feisthamel, 1833; Palamernis Meyrick, 1906

= Brachodes =

Genus of moths

Brachodes is a genus of moths in the family Brachodidae.

== Selected species ==
- Brachodes albina
- Brachodes anatolicus
- Brachodes appendiculata
- Brachodes bellicosus
- Brachodes beryti
- Brachodes buxeus
- Brachodes candefactus
- Brachodes canonitis
- Brachodes compar
- Brachodes fallax
- Brachodes flagellatus
- Brachodes flavescens
- Brachodes formosa
- Brachodes fulgurita
- Brachodes funebris
- Brachodes gressitti
- Brachodes infanda
- Brachodes keredjella
- Brachodes laeta
- Brachodes lucida
- Brachodes mesopotamica
- Brachodes metaspila
- Brachodes monotona
- Brachodes nana
- Brachodes nanetta
- Brachodes neglectus
- Brachodes nycteropis
- Brachodes orientalis
- Brachodes paghmanus
- Brachodes powelli
- Brachodes pumila
- Brachodes quiris
- Brachodes rasata
- Brachodes rhagensis
- Brachodes staudingeri
- Brachodes straminella
- Brachodes tristis
