= Phycodes substriata =

Scientific classification
- Kingdom: Animalia
- Phylum: Arthropoda
- Class: Insecta
- Order: Lepidoptera
- Family: Brachodidae
- Genus: Phykodes
- Species: P. substriata

Binomial name
- Phycodes substriata Walsingham, 1891

Species of moth

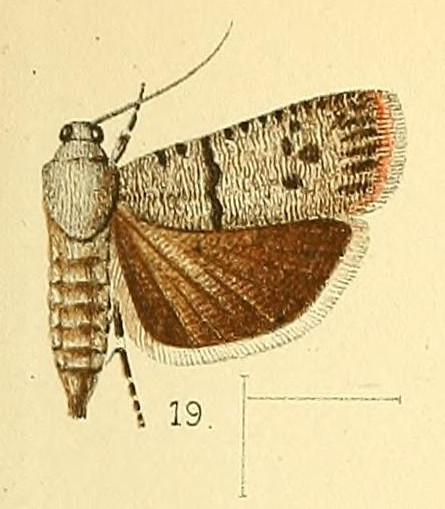
Phycodes substriata

Phycodes substriata is a moth in the family Brachodidae. It was described by Walsingham in 1891. It is found in Tanzania (Zanzibar).
