= Nigilgia browni =

Scientific classification
- Kingdom: Animalia
- Phylum: Arthropoda
- Clade: Pancrustacea
- Class: Insecta
- Order: Lepidoptera
- Family: Brachodidae
- Genus: Nigilgia
- Species: N. browni

Binomial name
- Nigilgia browni Kallies, 2013

Species of moth

Nigilgia browni is a moth in the family Brachodidae. It was described by Kallies in 2013. It is found on Christmas Island.
