= Synechodes olivora =

Scientific classification
- Domain: Eukaryota
- Kingdom: Animalia
- Phylum: Arthropoda
- Class: Insecta
- Order: Lepidoptera
- Family: Brachodidae
- Genus: Synechodes
- Species: S. olivora

Binomial name
- Synechodes olivora Kallies, 1998

Species of moth

Synechodes olivora is a moth in the family Brachodidae. It was described by Kallies in 1998. It is found in Malaysia and on Java.

Larvae have been reared from leaf stems of Elaeis guineensis and Calamus species.
