= Brachodes neglectus =

Scientific classification
- Kingdom: Animalia
- Phylum: Arthropoda
- Class: Insecta
- Order: Lepidoptera
- Family: Brachodidae
- Genus: Brachodes
- Species: B. neglectus

Binomial name
- Brachodes neglectus Kallies, 1998

Species of moth

Brachodes neglectus is a species of moth from the family Brachodidae. It is found in Kyrgyzstan and possibly Xinjiang in north-western China.

The wingspan is about 23 mm. The forewings are grey with whitish-yellow scales.
