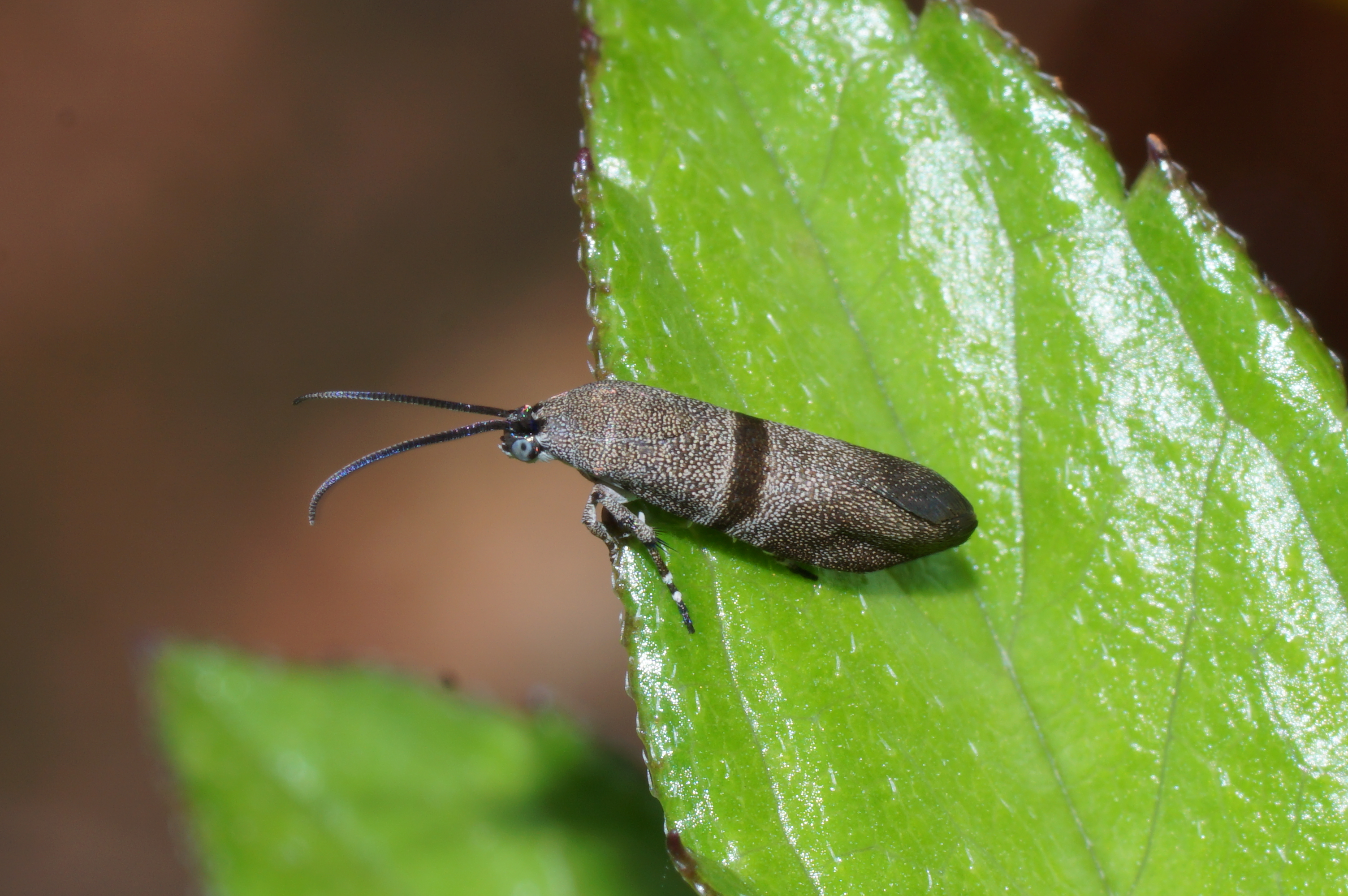

Scientific classification
- Domain: Eukaryota
- Kingdom: Animalia
- Phylum: Arthropoda
- Class: Insecta
- Order: Lepidoptera
- Family: Brachodidae
- Genus: Phycodes
- Species: P. minor

Binomial name
- Phycodes minor Moore, 1881

Synonyms
- Phycodes lucasseni Snellen, 1901; Phycodes cymineuta Meyrick, 1909; Phycodes omnimicans Diakonoff, 1978

= Phycodes minor =

Species of moth

Phycodes minor is a moth in the family Brachodidae. It was described by Frederic Moore in 1881. It is found in south and south-east Asia.
