= Brachodes orientalis =

Scientific classification
- Kingdom: Animalia
- Phylum: Arthropoda
- Class: Insecta
- Order: Lepidoptera
- Family: Brachodidae
- Genus: Brachodes
- Species: B. orientalis

Binomial name
- Brachodes orientalis (Rebel, 1905)

Synonyms
- Atychia orientalis Rebel, 1905

Species of moth

Brachodes orientalis is a moth of the family Brachodidae. It is found in Turkey.
