= Brachodes buxeus =

Scientific classification
- Kingdom: Animalia
- Phylum: Arthropoda
- Class: Insecta
- Order: Lepidoptera
- Family: Brachodidae
- Genus: Brachodes
- Species: B. buxeus

Binomial name
- Brachodes buxeus Kallies, 2001

Species of moth

Brachodes buxeus is a moth of the family Brachodidae. It is found in the Amanus Mountains, part of the eastern and central Toros Mountains in south-eastern and southern Turkey.

The wingspan is 21.5–27 mm. Adults have been recorded on wing in June and the beginning of July.
