= Nigilgia cuprea =

Scientific classification
- Domain: Eukaryota
- Kingdom: Animalia
- Phylum: Arthropoda
- Class: Insecta
- Order: Lepidoptera
- Family: Brachodidae
- Genus: Nigilgia
- Species: N. cuprea

Binomial name
- Nigilgia cuprea Kallies, 1998

Species of moth

Nigilgia cuprea is a moth in the family Brachodidae. It was described by Kallies in 1998. It is found in northern Borneo.
