= Brachodes tristis =

Scientific classification
- Kingdom: Animalia
- Phylum: Arthropoda
- Class: Insecta
- Order: Lepidoptera
- Family: Brachodidae
- Genus: Brachodes
- Species: B. tristis

Binomial name
- Brachodes tristis (Staudinger, 1879)

Synonyms
- Atychia tristis Staudinger, 1879

Species of moth

Brachodes tristis is a moth of the family Brachodidae. It is found in Bulgaria, North Macedonia, Greece and the Near East.

The wingspan is 20–23 mm. The forewings are orange brown with a black margin.
