= Brachodes paghmanus =

Scientific classification
- Kingdom: Animalia
- Phylum: Arthropoda
- Class: Insecta
- Order: Lepidoptera
- Family: Brachodidae
- Genus: Brachodes
- Species: B. paghmanus

Binomial name
- Brachodes paghmanus Kallies, 1998

Species of moth

Brachodes paghmanus is a moth of the family Brachodidae. It is found in Afghanistan.

The wingspan is about 28 mm (1.1 in). The forewings are grey with whitish-yellow scales. The hindwings are grey.
