= Phycodes tortricina =

Scientific classification
- Domain: Eukaryota
- Kingdom: Animalia
- Phylum: Arthropoda
- Class: Insecta
- Order: Lepidoptera
- Family: Brachodidae
- Genus: Phycodes
- Species: P. tortricina

Binomial name
- Phycodes tortricina Moore, 1881

Species of moth

Phycodes tortricina is a moth in the family Brachodidae. It was described by Frederic Moore in 1881. It is found in southern India.
