= Synechodes megaloptera =

Scientific classification
- Domain: Eukaryota
- Kingdom: Animalia
- Phylum: Arthropoda
- Class: Insecta
- Order: Lepidoptera
- Family: Brachodidae
- Genus: Synechodes
- Species: S. megaloptera

Binomial name
- Synechodes megaloptera Kallies, 1998

Species of moth

Synechodes megaloptera is a moth in the family Brachodidae. It was described by Kallies in 1998. It is found in northern Borneo.
