= Sagalassa nephelospila =

Scientific classification
- Kingdom: Animalia
- Phylum: Arthropoda
- Class: Insecta
- Order: Lepidoptera
- Family: Brachodidae
- Genus: Sagalassa
- Species: S. nephelospila

Binomial name
- Sagalassa nephelospila Meyrick, 1912

Species of moth

Sagalassa nephelospila is a moth in the family Brachodidae. It was described by Edward Meyrick in 1912. It is found in Venezuela and Guyana.
