= Sagalassa chrysauge =

Scientific classification
- Domain: Eukaryota
- Kingdom: Animalia
- Phylum: Arthropoda
- Class: Insecta
- Order: Lepidoptera
- Family: Brachodidae
- Genus: Sagalassa
- Species: S. chrysauge

Binomial name
- Sagalassa chrysauge (Felder, 1875)

Synonyms
- Eustixis chrysauge Felder, 1875

Species of moth

Sagalassa chrysauge is a moth in the family Brachodidae. It was described by Felder in 1875. It is found in the Amazon region.
