= Synechodes sumatrana =

Scientific classification
- Domain: Eukaryota
- Kingdom: Animalia
- Phylum: Arthropoda
- Class: Insecta
- Order: Lepidoptera
- Family: Brachodidae
- Genus: Synechodes
- Species: S. sumatrana

Binomial name
- Synechodes sumatrana Kallies, 2000

Species of moth

Synechodes sumatrana is a moth in the family Brachodidae. It was described by Kallies in 2000. It is found on Sumatra.
