= Paranigilgia brandti =

Scientific classification
- Domain: Eukaryota
- Kingdom: Animalia
- Phylum: Arthropoda
- Class: Insecta
- Order: Lepidoptera
- Family: Brachodidae
- Genus: Paranigilgia
- Species: P. brandti

Binomial name
- Paranigilgia brandti Kallies, 2013

Species of moth

Paranigilgia brandti is a moth in the family Brachodidae. It was described by Kallies in 2013. It is found in Papua New Guinea.
