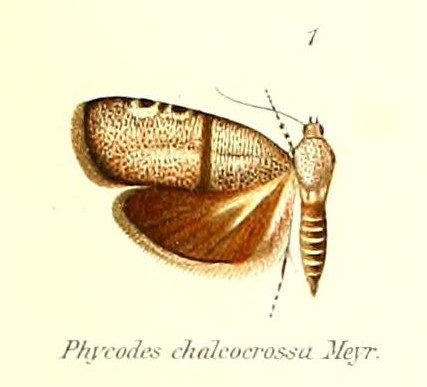

Scientific classification
- Kingdom: Animalia
- Phylum: Arthropoda
- Clade: Pancrustacea
- Class: Insecta
- Order: Lepidoptera
- Family: Brachodidae
- Genus: Phykodes
- Species: P. chalcocrossa

Binomial name
- Phykodes chalcocrossa Meyrick, 1909

Synonyms
- Phycodes mesopotamica Rebel, 1910

= Phykodes chalcocrossa =

Species of moth

Phykodes chalcocrossa is a moth in the family Brachodidae. It was described by Edward Meyrick in 1909. It is found in the Middle East and Saudi Arabia.
