= Brachodes straminella =

Scientific classification
- Kingdom: Animalia
- Phylum: Arthropoda
- Class: Insecta
- Order: Lepidoptera
- Family: Brachodidae
- Genus: Brachodes
- Species: B. straminella

Binomial name
- Brachodes straminella (Rebel, 1916)

Synonyms
- Atychia straminella Rebel, 1916

Species of moth

Brachodes straminella is a moth of the family Brachodidae. It is found in Mongolia and Russia.
