= Sagalassa valida =

Scientific classification
- Kingdom: Animalia
- Phylum: Arthropoda
- Class: Insecta
- Order: Lepidoptera
- Family: Brachodidae
- Genus: Sagalassa
- Species: S. valida

Binomial name
- Sagalassa valida Walker, 1856

Synonyms
- Jonaca compulsana Walker, 1863; Sagalassa crassalis Walker, 1865; Jonaca olivacea Busck, 1914; Sagalassa querula Felder, 1875

Species of moth

Sagalassa valida, the oil palm rootworm, is a moth in the family Brachodidae. It is found in Panama, Colombia, Peru, Guyana and Brazil.
