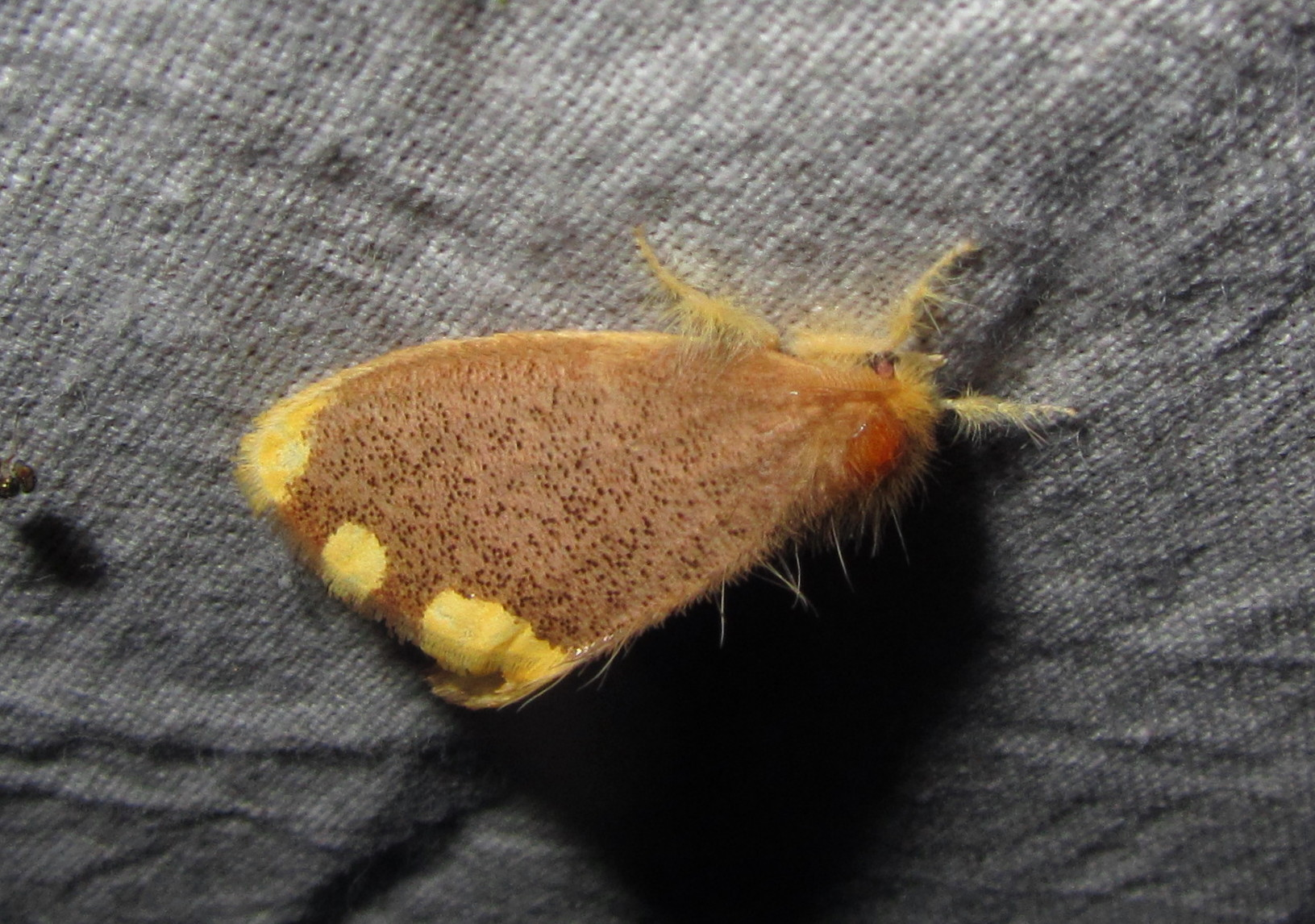

Scientific classification
- Kingdom: Animalia
- Phylum: Arthropoda
- Class: Insecta
- Order: Lepidoptera
- Superfamily: Noctuoidea
- Family: Erebidae
- Genus: Somena
- Species: S. scintillans

Binomial name
- Somena scintillans (Walker, 1856)

Synonyms
- Artaxa scintillans; Euproctis scintillans; Nygmia scintillans; Prothesia scintillans

= Somena scintillans =

Yellow tail tussock moth

Species of moth

Somena scintillans, the yellow tail tussock moth, is a moth in the family Erebidae described by Francis Walker in 1856. It is found in northern India, Sri Lanka, Myanmar and the Andaman Islands. Though considered a minor pest, larva can sporadically be a serious pest.

== Description ==
Head yellow. Thorax brownish. Abdomen black or yellow with orange anal tuft. Forewing vinous brown, irrorated (sprinkled) with dark scales, which colour extends as two spurs across the yellow marginal area below the apex and to center of margin, but sometimes not reaching the margin. Costa often yellowish. Hindwings yellow, or in some specimens fuscous brown with a broad yellow margin.

It is a polyphagous species. Larva dark brown with a series of crimson lateral tubercles on a yellow line bearing tufts of grey hair. The third somite banded with yellow. Dorsal tufts of short brown hair on fourth, fifth and eleventh somites. Fifth to tenth somites with a broad, dorsal yellow stripe. There is a yellow spot on the anal somite.

Larva is known to damage apple plantations, and is commonly collected on ragi, castor, pigeon pea, cowpea, field bean, cucurbits, mango, citrus, hibiscus, rose, ficus, coffee, tea, and many more.
