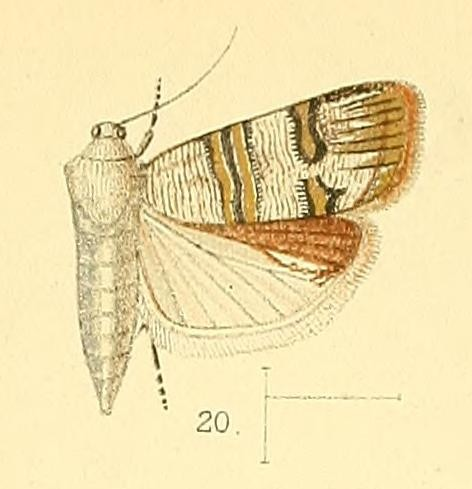

Scientific classification
- Domain: Eukaryota
- Kingdom: Animalia
- Phylum: Arthropoda
- Class: Insecta
- Order: Lepidoptera
- Family: Brachodidae
- Genus: Nigilgia
- Species: N. albitogata

Binomial name
- Nigilgia albitogata (Walsingham, 1891)

Synonyms
- Phycodes albitogata Walsingham, 1891

= Nigilgia albitogata =

Species of moth

Nigilgia albitogata is a moth in the family Brachodidae. It was described by Walsingham in 1891. It is found in South Africa and Gambia.
