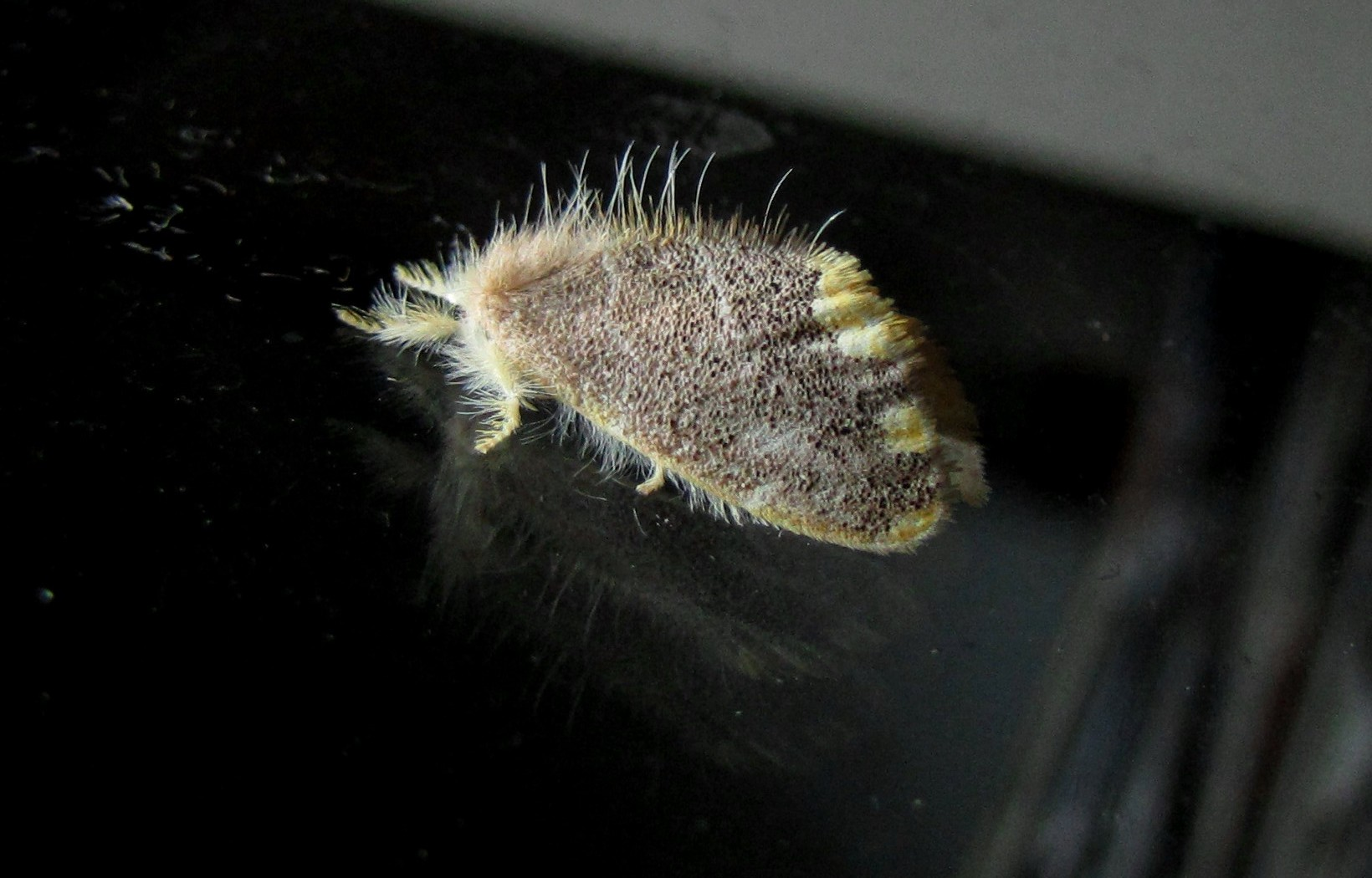

Scientific classification
- Domain: Eukaryota
- Kingdom: Animalia
- Phylum: Arthropoda
- Class: Insecta
- Order: Lepidoptera
- Superfamily: Noctuoidea
- Family: Erebidae
- Tribe: Nygmiini
- Genus: Somena; Walker, 1856

Synonyms
- Trichia Nietner, 1861

= Somena (moth) =

Genus of moths

Somena is a genus of tussock moths in the family Erebidae. The genus was erected by Francis Walker in 1856.

== Species ==
- Somena aurantiacoides Holloway, 1999
- Somena exigua (Nietner, 1861)
- Somena pulverea (Leech, 1888)
- Somena moorei (Snellen, 1879)
- Somena scintillans Walker, 1856
- Somena similis (Moore, [1860])
