= Brachodes fallax =

Scientific classification
- Kingdom: Animalia
- Phylum: Arthropoda
- Class: Insecta
- Order: Lepidoptera
- Family: Brachodidae
- Genus: Brachodes
- Species: B. fallax

Binomial name
- Brachodes fallax (Staudinger, 1900)

Synonyms
- Atychia fallax Staudinger, 1900

Species of moth

Brachodes fallax is a moth of the family Brachodidae. It is found in north-western China, south-eastern Kazakhstan and Kyrgyzstan.

The wingspan is 18.5–29 mm. Adults are on wing from the end of May to July.
