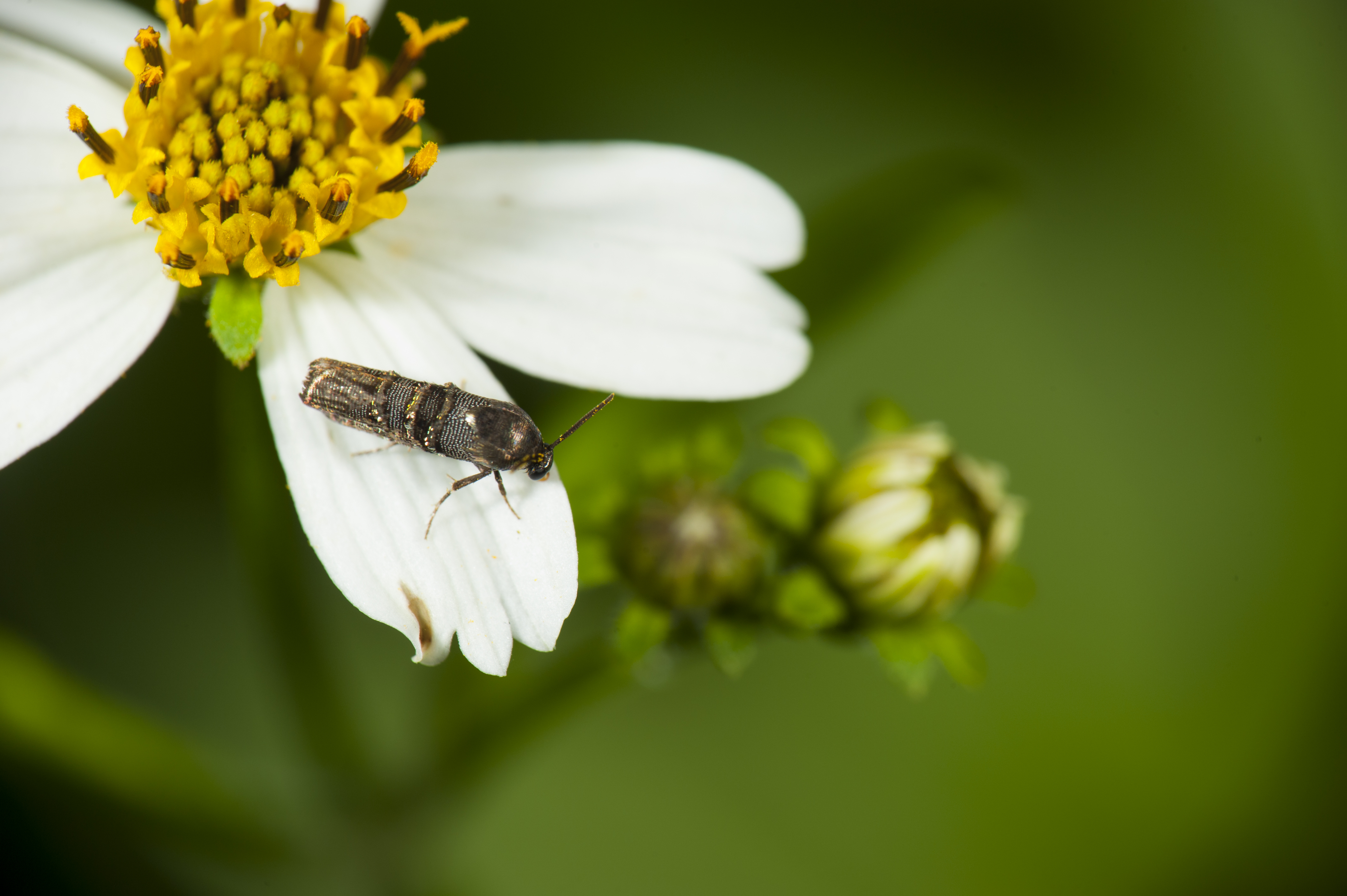

Scientific classification
- Kingdom: Animalia
- Phylum: Arthropoda
- Clade: Pancrustacea
- Class: Insecta
- Order: Lepidoptera
- Family: Brachodidae
- Genus: Nigilgia
- Species: N. limata

Binomial name
- Nigilgia limata Diakonof & Arita, 1979

= Nigilgia limata =

Species of insect

Nigilgia limata is a moth in the family Brachodidae. It was described by Alexey Diakonoff and Yutaka Arita in 1979. It is found on the Ryukyu Islands of Japan and in Taiwan.
