= Synechodes =

Scientific classification
- Domain: Eukaryota
- Kingdom: Animalia
- Phylum: Arthropoda
- Class: Insecta
- Order: Lepidoptera
- Family: Brachodidae
- Subfamily: Brachodinae
- Genus: Synechodes; Turner, 1913

Species
- See text

Genus of moths

Synechodes is a genus of moths in the family Brachodidae.

== Species ==
- Synechodes agrippina (Meyrick, 1930) (Sulawesi, Indonesia)
- Synechodes andamanus Kallies, 2004 (Andamans, India)
- Synechodes coniophora Turner, 1913 (Australia)
- Synechodes diabolus (Felder & Rogenhofer, 1875) (Moluccas, New Guinea)
- Synechodes exigua Kallies, 2004 (Assam, India)
- Synechodes fulvoris Kallies, 1998 (Sulawesi: Indonesia)
- Synechodes lunaris Kallies, 2004 (Malaysia)
- Synechodes megaloptera Kallies, 1998 (northern Borneo)
- Synechodes olivora Kallies, 1998 (Malaysia, Java)
- Synechodes papuana Heppner, 1990 (New Guinea)
- Synechodes platysema (Meyrick, 1921) (Java: Indonesia)
- Synechodes polias Kallies, 2013
- Synechodes rotanicola Kallies, 2004 (Java: Indonesia)
- Synechodes royalis Kallies, 1998 (Myanmar)
- Synechodes rubroris Kallies, 1998 (Sulawesi: Indonesia)
- Synechodes sidereus Kallies, 2004 (New Guinea)
- Synechodes sumatrana Kallies, 2000 (Sumatra: Indonesia)
- Synechodes tamila Kallies, 2013
