= Miscera eubrachycera =

Scientific classification
- Domain: Eukaryota
- Kingdom: Animalia
- Phylum: Arthropoda
- Class: Insecta
- Order: Lepidoptera
- Family: Brachodidae
- Genus: Miscera
- Species: M. eubrachycera

Binomial name
- Miscera eubrachycera (Diakonoff, [1968])

Synonyms
- Sagalassa eubrachycera Diakonoff, 1968

Species of moth

Miscera eubrachycera is a moth in the family Brachodidae. It was described by Alexey Diakonoff in 1968. It is found in the Philippines.
