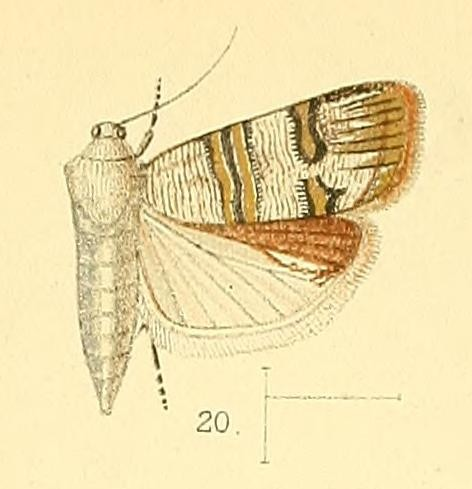
- Nigilgia albitogata

Scientific classification
- Kingdom: Animalia
- Phylum: Arthropoda
- Class: Insecta
- Order: Lepidoptera
- Family: Brachodidae
- Subfamily: Phycodinae
- Genus: Nigilgia; Walker, 1863

Species
- See text

= Nigilgia =

Genus of moths

Nigilgia is a genus of moths in the family Brachodidae.

== Species ==
- Nigilgia adjectella Walker, 1863 (Australia)
- Nigilgia albitogata (Walsingham, 1891)
- Nigilgia anactis Diakonoff, 1982 (Sri Lanka)
- Nigilgia atribractea Kallies, 2013
- Nigilgia aureoviridis Kallies, 1998 (Sulawesi)
- Nigilgia browni Kallies, 2013
- Nigilgia cuprea Kallies, 1998 (northern Borneo)
- Nigilgia diehli Kallies, 2000 (Sumatra)
- Nigilgia eucallynta (Meyrick, 1937)
- Nigilgia limata Diakonoff & Arita, 1979 (Ryukyu Islands, Taiwan)
- Nigilgia mochlophanes (Meyrick, 1921)
- Nigilgia pseliota (Meyrick, 1920)
- Nigilgia seyrigella (Viette, 1954) (Madagascar)
- Nigilgia superbella (Rebel, 1907) (Yemen, Saudi Arabia, United Arab Emirates)
- Nigilgia talhouki Diakonoff, 1984 (Saudi Arabia)
- Nigilgia toulgoetella (Viette, 1954) (Madagascar)
- Nigilgia venerea (Meyrick, 1921) (Java, Sumatra, Sulawesi, northern Borneo) (syn: Nigilgia nagaii Arita, 1987)
- Nigilgia violacea Kallies & Arita, 2007
