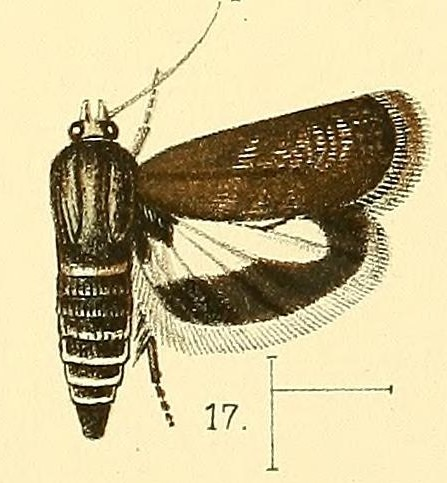

Scientific classification
- Kingdom: Animalia
- Phylum: Arthropoda
- Class: Insecta
- Order: Lepidoptera
- Family: Brachodidae
- Genus: Archaeotychia
- Species: A. albiciliata

Binomial name
- Archaeotychia albiciliata (Walsingham, 1891)

Synonyms
- Atractoceros albiciliata Heppner, 1981; Atychia albiciliata Walsingham, 1891; Atychia metaspila Meyrick, 1926; Brachodes metaspila Meyrick, 1926

= Archaeotychia albiciliata =

Species of insect

Archaeotychia albiciliata is a moth in the family Brachodidae. It was described by Walsingham in 1891. It is found in South Africa.
