= Brachodes lucida =

Scientific classification
- Kingdom: Animalia
- Phylum: Arthropoda
- Class: Insecta
- Order: Lepidoptera
- Family: Brachodidae
- Genus: Brachodes
- Species: B. lucida

Binomial name
- Brachodes lucida (Lederer, 1853)

Synonyms
- Atychia appendiculata var. lucida Lederer, 1853; Atychia lucida; Atychia dispar Herrich-Schäffer, 1854

Species of moth

Brachodes lucida is a moth of the family Brachodidae. It is found from Romania, Bulgaria, and the southern part of European Russia and Turkey to the eastern Palearctic realm.
