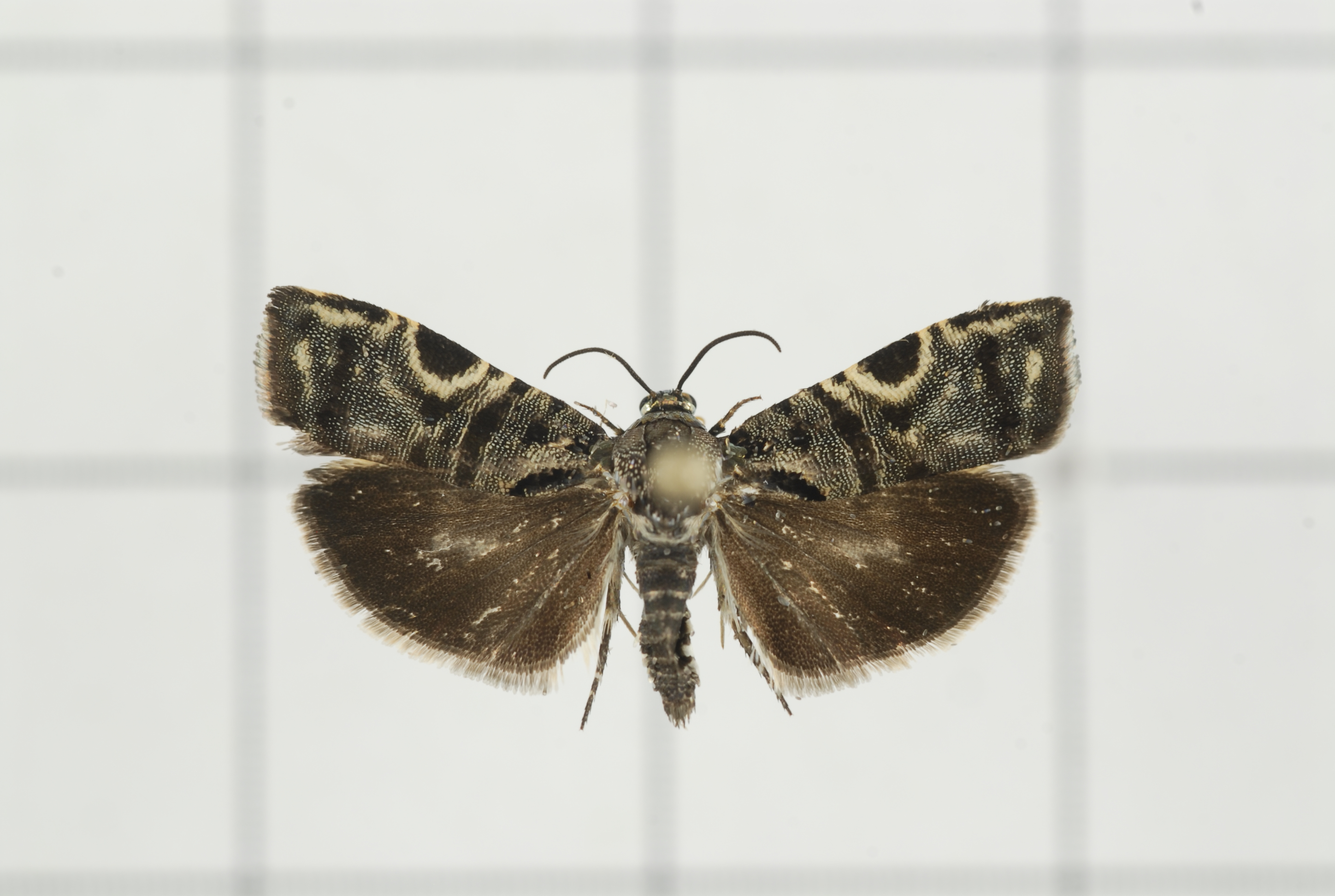
- Paranigilgia bushii

Scientific classification
- Kingdom: Animalia
- Phylum: Arthropoda
- Clade: Pancrustacea
- Class: Insecta
- Order: Lepidoptera
- Family: Brachodidae
- Genus: Paranigilgia
- Species: P. bushii

Binomial name
- Paranigilgia bushii (Arita, 1980)

Synonyms
- Phycodes bushii Arita, 1980

= Paranigilgia bushii =

Species of moth

Paranigilgia bushii is a moth in the family Brachodidae. It was described by Yutaka Arita in 1980. It is found on the Ryukyu Islands of Japan and in Taiwan.
