= Synechodes exigua =

Scientific classification
- Domain: Eukaryota
- Kingdom: Animalia
- Phylum: Arthropoda
- Class: Insecta
- Order: Lepidoptera
- Family: Brachodidae
- Genus: Synechodes
- Species: S. exigua

Binomial name
- Synechodes exigua Kallies, 2004

Species of moth

Synechodes exigua is a moth in the family Brachodidae. It was described by Kallies in 2004. It is found in India (Assam).

The wingspan is 14–16 mm for males and 15 mm for females. The forewings are black with a transverse yellow stripe near the costa and large yellow spots near the anal margin and the base. The hindwings are black with a yellow subbasal band.

== Etymology ==
The species name refers to the size of the species and is derived from exiguus (meaning small).
