= Nigilgia mochlophanes =

Scientific classification
- Kingdom: Animalia
- Phylum: Arthropoda
- Class: Insecta
- Order: Lepidoptera
- Family: Brachodidae
- Genus: Nigilgia
- Species: N. mochlophanes

Binomial name
- Nigilgia mochlophanes (Meyrick, 1921)

Synonyms
- Phycodes mochlophanes Meyrick, 1921

Species of moth

Nigilgia mochlophanes is a moth in the family Brachodidae. It was described by Edward Meyrick in 1921. It is found in Mozambique.

The wingspan is about 15 mm. The forewings are dark fuscous closely speckled with whitish in a fine transverse series, a spot of pencilling in the middle of the base and straight transverse slender blackish fasciae at one-third and two-thirds edged with iridescent greenish-coppery-metallic streaks, the margins of the second confluent above and below the middle and with the posterior projection in the middle. There is a greenish-coppery-metallic terminal fascia, widest at the extremities and with the anterior edge concave, ending abruptly just above the tornus, cut by seven irregular longitudinal blackish marks. The hindwings are dark fuscous.
