= Paranigilgia =

Scientific classification
- Domain: Eukaryota
- Kingdom: Animalia
- Phylum: Arthropoda
- Class: Insecta
- Order: Lepidoptera
- Family: Brachodidae
- Subfamily: Phycodinae
- Genus: Paranigilgia; Kallies, 1998

Genus of moths

Paranigilgia is a genus of moths in the family Brachodidae.

== Species ==
- Paranigilgia aritai Kallies, 1998
- Paranigilgia brandti Kallies, 2013
- Paranigilgia bushii (Arita, 1980)
- Paranigilgia mariannae Kallies, 2013
- Paranigilgia morosa (Diakonoff, 1948)
