= Synechodes platysema =

Scientific classification
- Kingdom: Animalia
- Phylum: Arthropoda
- Class: Insecta
- Order: Lepidoptera
- Family: Brachodidae
- Genus: Synechodes
- Species: S. platysema

Binomial name
- Synechodes platysema (Meyrick, 1921)

Synonyms
- Sagalassa platysema Meyrick, 1921

Species of moth

Synechodes platysema is a moth in the family Brachodidae. It was described by Edward Meyrick in 1921. It is found on Java in Indonesia.

The wingspan is about 18 mm. The forewings are dark with a pale yellow costal margin and a yellow spot near the base, as well as a pale yellow, moon-shaped spot. The hindwings are yellow, but black at the base. There is a black marginal band.
