= Archaeotychia quiris =

Scientific classification
- Kingdom: Animalia
- Phylum: Arthropoda
- Class: Insecta
- Order: Lepidoptera
- Family: Brachodidae
- Genus: Archaeotychia
- Species: A. quiris

Binomial name
- Archaeotychia quiris (Felder & Rogenhofer, 1875)

Synonyms
- Atychia quiris Felder & Rogenhofer, 1875; Brachodes quiris Felder & Rogenhofer, 1875

Species of moth

Archaeotychia quiris is a moth of the family Brachodidae. It is found in South Africa.
