= Euthorybeta =

Scientific classification
- Domain: Eukaryota
- Kingdom: Animalia
- Phylum: Arthropoda
- Class: Insecta
- Order: Lepidoptera
- Family: Brachodidae
- Subfamily: Brachodinae
- Genus: Euthorybeta; Turner, 1913

Species
- See text

Genus of moths

Euthorybeta is a genus of moths in the family Brachodidae.

== Species ==
- Euthorybeta ochroplaca Turner, 1913
- Euthorybeta xanthoplaca Turner, 1913
