= Euthorybeta ochroplaca =

Scientific classification
- Domain: Eukaryota
- Kingdom: Animalia
- Phylum: Arthropoda
- Class: Insecta
- Order: Lepidoptera
- Family: Brachodidae
- Genus: Euthorybeta
- Species: E. ochroplaca

Binomial name
- Euthorybeta ochroplaca Turner, 1913

Species of moth

Euthorybeta ochroplaca is a moth in the family Brachodidae. It was described by Turner in 1913. It is found in Australia.
