= Paranigilgia morosa =

Scientific classification
- Domain: Eukaryota
- Kingdom: Animalia
- Phylum: Arthropoda
- Class: Insecta
- Order: Lepidoptera
- Family: Brachodidae
- Genus: Paranigilgia
- Species: P. morosa

Binomial name
- Paranigilgia morosa (Diakonoff, 1948)

Synonyms
- Phycodes morosa Diakonoff, 1948

Species of moth

Paranigilgia morosa is a moth in the family Brachodidae. It was described by Alexey Diakonoff in 1948. It is found on the Moluccas and in New Guinea.
