= Phycodopteryx =

Scientific classification
- Domain: Eukaryota
- Kingdom: Animalia
- Phylum: Arthropoda
- Class: Insecta
- Order: Lepidoptera
- Family: Brachodidae
- Genus: Phycodopteryx; Kallies, 2004
- Species: P. tigripes

Binomial name
- Phycodopteryx tigripes Kallies, 2004

Genus of moths

Phycodopteryx is a genus of moths in the family Brachodidae. It contains the single species Phycodopteryx tigripes, which is found in Vietnam and India (Assam). The habitat consists of submontane tropical forests.

The wingspan is 25–30 mm for females and 23–25 mm for males. Adults have been recorded on wing from early May to early June, probably in one generation per year.
