= Saccocera =

Scientific classification
- Domain: Eukaryota
- Kingdom: Animalia
- Phylum: Arthropoda
- Class: Insecta
- Order: Lepidoptera
- Family: Brachodidae
- Subfamily: Brachodinae
- Genus: Saccocera; Kallies, 2013

Species
- See text

Genus of moths

Saccocera is a genus of moths in the family Brachodidae.

== Species ==
- Saccocera miangkabau Kallies, 2013
- Saccocera orpheus (Kallies, 2004)
- Saccocera panaras Kallies, 2013
- Saccocera sauteri (Kallies, 2004)
