= Synechodes diabolus =

Scientific classification
- Domain: Eukaryota
- Kingdom: Animalia
- Phylum: Arthropoda
- Class: Insecta
- Order: Lepidoptera
- Family: Brachodidae
- Genus: Synechodes
- Species: S. diabolus

Binomial name
- Synechodes diabolus (C. Felder, R. Felder & Rogenhofer, 1875)

Synonyms
- Atychia diabolus Felder & Rogenhofer, 1875

Species of moth

Synechodes diabolus is a moth in the family Brachodidae. It was described by Cajetan Felder, Rudolf Felder and Alois Friedrich Rogenhofer in 1875. It is found on the Moluccas and in New Guinea.

The wingspan is 16.5–18 mm for males and 22-22.5 mm for females. The forewings are black, with a yellow spot and a yellow patch near the base. The hindwings are black, with a yellow subbasal band.
