= Synechodes coniophora =

Scientific classification
- Domain: Eukaryota
- Kingdom: Animalia
- Phylum: Arthropoda
- Class: Insecta
- Order: Lepidoptera
- Family: Brachodidae
- Genus: Synechodes
- Species: S. coniophora

Binomial name
- Synechodes coniophora Turner, 1913

Species of moth

Synechodes coniophora is a moth in the family Brachodidae. It was described by Turner in 1913. It is found in Australia, where it has been recorded from Queensland.
