= Phycodes penitis =

Scientific classification
- Domain: Eukaryota
- Kingdom: Animalia
- Phylum: Arthropoda
- Class: Insecta
- Order: Lepidoptera
- Family: Brachodidae
- Genus: Phycodes
- Species: P. penitis

Binomial name
- Phycodes penitis Diakonoff, 1978

Species of moth

Phycodes penitis is a moth in the family Brachodidae. It was described by Alexey Diakonoff in 1978. It is found in northern Borneo.
