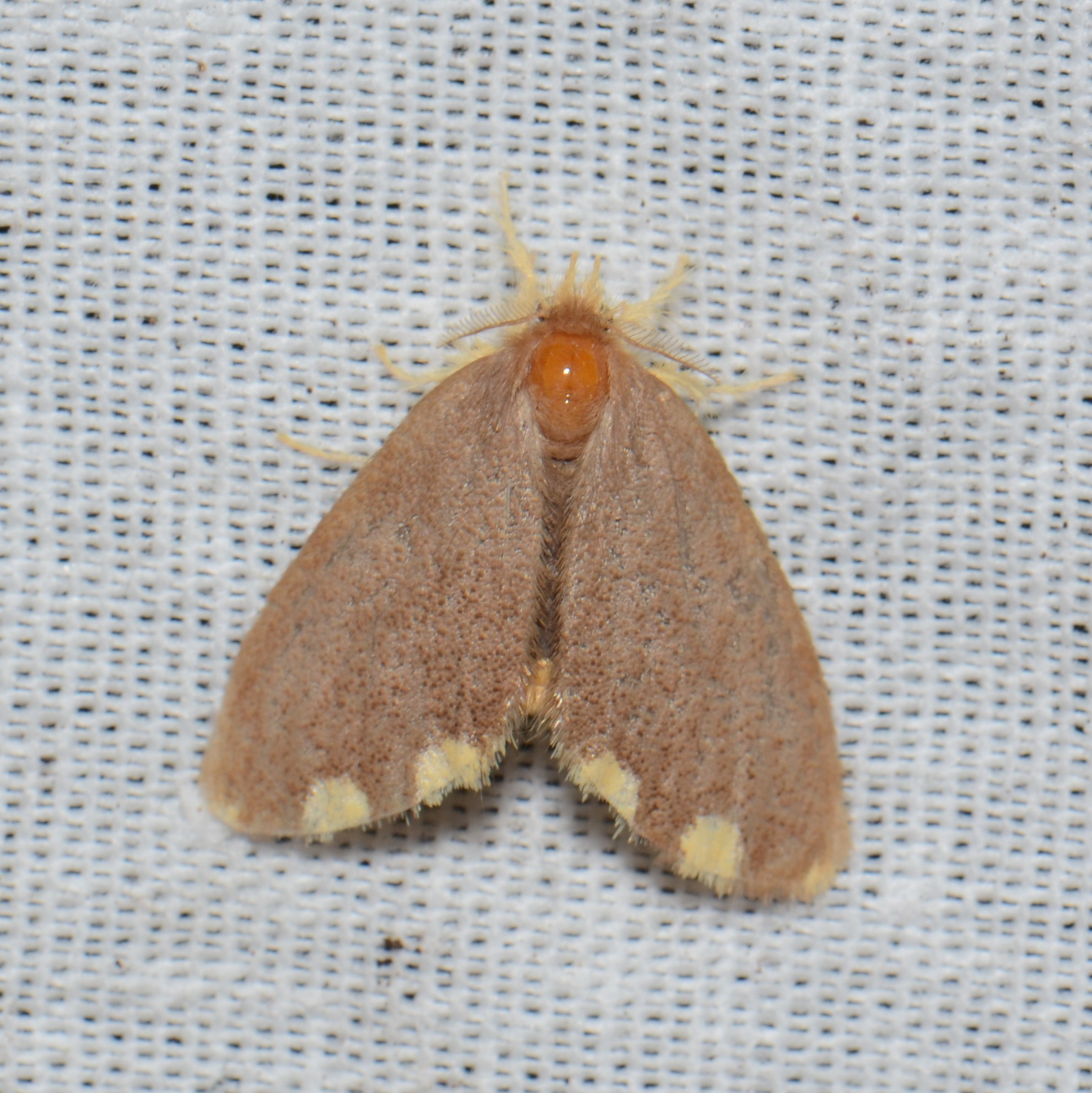

Scientific classification
- Domain: Eukaryota
- Kingdom: Animalia
- Phylum: Arthropoda
- Class: Insecta
- Order: Lepidoptera
- Superfamily: Noctuoidea
- Family: Erebidae
- Genus: Somena
- Species: S. similis

Binomial name
- Somena similis (Moore, [1860])

Synonyms
- Artaxa similis Moore, [1860]; Nygmia similis; Somena irrorata Moore, [1883]; Euproctis raratior Collenette, 1949

= Somena similis =

Species of moth

Somena similis is a moth in the family Erebidae. It was described by Frederic Moore in 1860. It is found from India to Sundaland.
