= Saccocera orpheus =

Scientific classification
- Domain: Eukaryota
- Kingdom: Animalia
- Phylum: Arthropoda
- Class: Insecta
- Order: Lepidoptera
- Family: Brachodidae
- Genus: Saccocera
- Species: S. orpheus

Binomial name
- Saccocera orpheus Kallies, 2004

Synonyms
- Miscera orpheus Kallies, 2004

Species of moth

Saccocera orpheus is a moth in the family Brachodidae. It was described by Kallies in 2004. It is found on the Indonesian islands of Java and Sulawesi.

The wingspan is 16.5 mm for males and 24 mm for females.

== Etymology ==
The species is named for Orpheus and refers to the dark coloration of the species.
