= Hoplophractis =

Scientific classification
- Kingdom: Animalia
- Phylum: Arthropoda
- Class: Insecta
- Order: Lepidoptera
- Family: Brachodidae
- Genus: Hoplophractis; Meyrick, 1920
- Species: H. heptachalca

Binomial name
- Hoplophractis heptachalca Meyrick, 1920

Genus of moths

Hoplophractis is a genus of moths of the family Brachodidae. There is only one species in this genus: Hoplophractis heptachalca, that is a dayflying moth known from Óbidos, Pará, Brazil and from Trinidad and Tobago.

Its wingspan is 11–12 mm and it is on wing from August to October.

== Biology ==
Known host plant of this species is Clidemia hirta (Melastomataceae).
