= Sisyroctenis =

Scientific classification
- Kingdom: Animalia
- Phylum: Arthropoda
- Class: Insecta
- Order: Lepidoptera
- Family: Brachodidae
- Genus: Sisyroctenis; Meyrick, 1936
- Species: S. hemicamina

Binomial name
- Sisyroctenis hemicamina Meyrick, 1936

Genus of moths

Sisyroctenis is a genus of moths in the family Brachodidae. It contains the single species Sisyroctenis hemicamina, which is found in Peru.
