= Nigilgia venerea =

Scientific classification
- Kingdom: Animalia
- Phylum: Arthropoda
- Class: Insecta
- Order: Lepidoptera
- Family: Brachodidae
- Genus: Nigilgia
- Species: N. venerea

Binomial name
- Nigilgia venerea (Meyrick, 1921)

Synonyms
- Phycodes venerea Meyrick, 1921; Nigilgia nagaii Arita, 1987

Species of moth

Nigilgia venerea is a moth in the family Brachodidae. It was described by Edward Meyrick in 1921. It is found on Java, Sumatra, Sulawesi and northern Borneo.
