= Saccocera sauteri =

Scientific classification
- Domain: Eukaryota
- Kingdom: Animalia
- Phylum: Arthropoda
- Class: Insecta
- Order: Lepidoptera
- Family: Brachodidae
- Genus: Saccocera
- Species: S. sauteri

Binomial name
- Saccocera sauteri (Kallies, 2004)

Synonyms
- Miscera sauteri Kallies, 2004

Species of moth

Saccocera sauteri is a moth in the family Brachodidae. It was described by Kallies in 2004. It is found in Taiwan.

The wingspan is 20 mm for males and 24 mm for females.

== Etymology ==
The species is named in honour of the lepidopterist Hans Sauter.
