= Nigilgia seyrigella =

Scientific classification
- Kingdom: Animalia
- Phylum: Arthropoda
- Class: Insecta
- Order: Lepidoptera
- Family: Brachodidae
- Genus: Nigilgia
- Species: N. seyrigella

Binomial name
- Nigilgia seyrigella Viette, 1954

Synonyms
- Phycodes seyrigella

Species of moth

Nigilgia seyrigella is a moth in the family Brachodidae. It was described by Viette in 1954. It is found in Madagascar.

The larvae feed on Ficus species.
