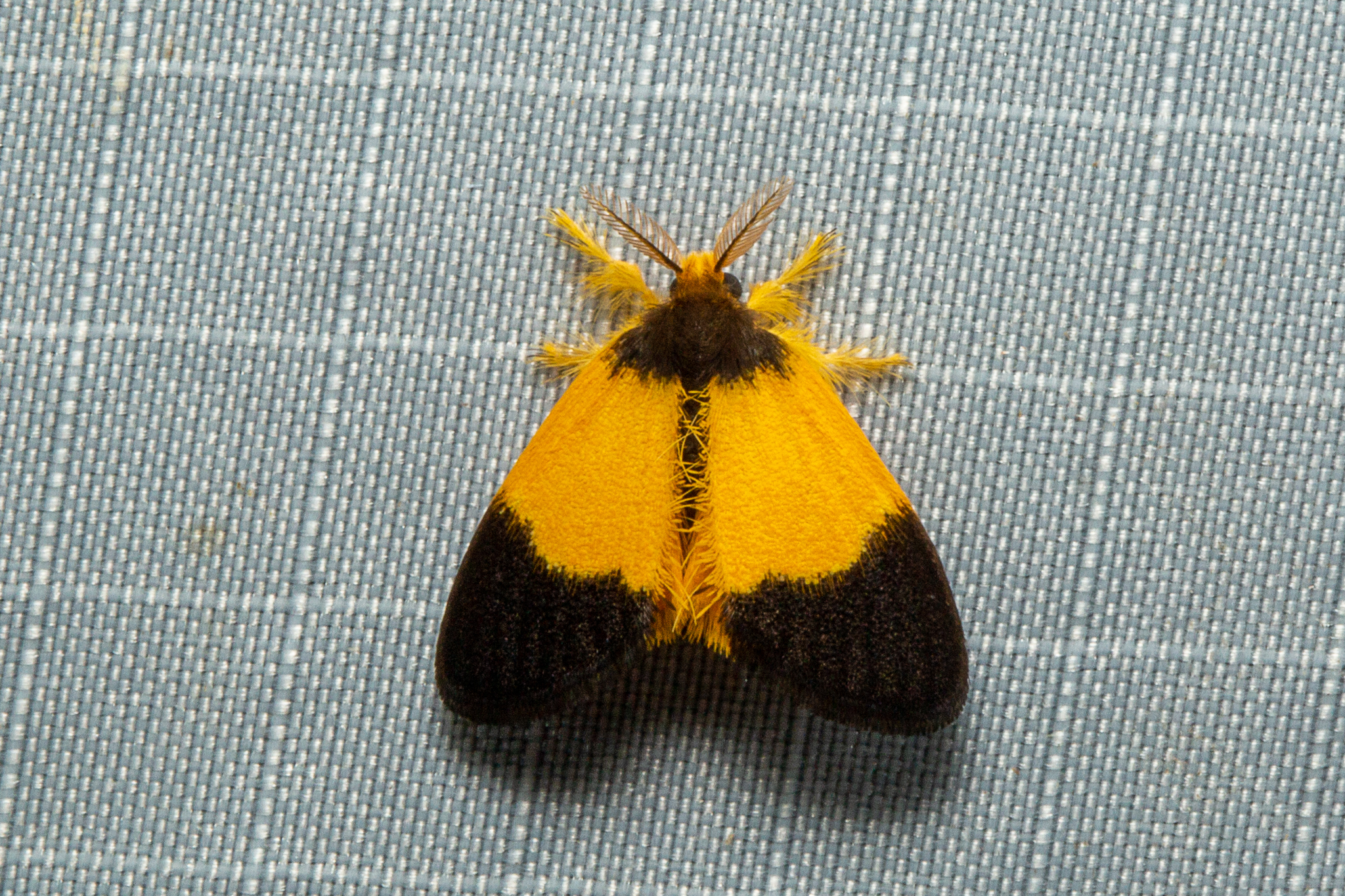
- Somena aurantiacoides

Scientific classification
- Kingdom: Animalia
- Phylum: Arthropoda
- Clade: Pancrustacea
- Class: Insecta
- Order: Lepidoptera
- Superfamily: Noctuoidea
- Family: Erebidae
- Genus: Somena
- Species: S. aurantiacoides

Binomial name
- Somena aurantiacoides Holloway, 1999

= Somena aurantiacoides =

Species of moth

Somena aurantiacoides is a moth in the family Erebidae. It was described by Jeremy Daniel Holloway in 1999. It is found on Borneo and Sumatra.

The length of the forewings is 10–11 mm.
