= Nigilgia pseliota =

Scientific classification
- Kingdom: Animalia
- Phylum: Arthropoda
- Class: Insecta
- Order: Lepidoptera
- Family: Brachodidae
- Genus: Nigilgia
- Species: N. pseliota

Binomial name
- Nigilgia pseliota (Meyrick, 1920)

Synonyms
- Phycodes pseliota Meyrick, 1920

Species of moth

Nigilgia pseliota is a moth in the family Brachodidae. It was described by Edward Meyrick in 1920. It is found in South Africa.
