= Nigilgia superbella =

Scientific classification
- Domain: Eukaryota
- Kingdom: Animalia
- Phylum: Arthropoda
- Class: Insecta
- Order: Lepidoptera
- Family: Brachodidae
- Genus: Nigilgia
- Species: N. superbella

Binomial name
- Nigilgia superbella (Rebel, 1907)

Synonyms
- Phycodes superbella Rebel, 1907

Species of moth

Nigilgia superbella is a moth in the family Brachodidae. It was described by Rebel in 1907. It is known from Yemen, Saudi Arabia and the United Arab Emirates.

The larvae feed on Ficus species.
