= Somena moorei =

Scientific classification
- Kingdom: Animalia
- Phylum: Arthropoda
- Class: Insecta
- Order: Lepidoptera
- Superfamily: Noctuoidea
- Family: Erebidae
- Genus: Somena
- Species: S. moorei

Binomial name
- Somena moorei (Snellen, 1879)

Synonyms
- Euproctis moorei Snellen, 1879

Species of moth

Somena moorei is a moth in the family Erebidae. It was described by Pieter Cornelius Tobias Snellen in 1879. It is found on Sulawesi.
