= Nigilgia eucallynta =

Scientific classification
- Kingdom: Animalia
- Phylum: Arthropoda
- Class: Insecta
- Order: Lepidoptera
- Family: Brachodidae
- Genus: Nigilgia
- Species: N. eucallynta

Binomial name
- Nigilgia eucallynta (Meyrick, 1937)

Synonyms
- Phycodes eucallynta Meyrick, 1937

Species of moth

Nigilgia eucallynta is a moth in the family Brachodidae. It was described by Edward Meyrick in 1937. It is found in Namibia and South Africa.
