= Festuca ampla =

Scientific classification
- Kingdom: Plantae
- Clade: Tracheophytes
- Clade: Angiosperms
- Clade: Monocots
- Clade: Commelinids
- Order: Poales
- Family: Poaceae
- Subfamily: Pooideae
- Genus: Festuca
- Species: F. ampla

Binomial name
- Festuca ampla Hack

Synonyms
- Festuca ampla subsp. simplex; Festuca ampla var. dolosa; Festuca ampla var. effusa; Festuca duriuscula var. effusa; Festuca scaberrima var. simplex

Species of grass

Festuca ampla is a species of grass described and named by the botanist Eduard Hackel in 1880. F. ampla often thrives in habitats that include humid environments, arid soil, and sandy areas. This species grows in temperate biomes and is a perennial. This species is native to Portugal, Spain, and Morocco.

== Description ==
Festuca ampla can grow up to 50 to 100 cm in height. Its leaves of are distichously arranged, clasped, and linear with a blue-green hue. The flowers of F. ampla are in panicles. The grasses produce caryopses.

== Ecology ==
The fungus Epichloe festucae has been found on F. ampla. It is observed that this species is a pleiotropic symbiont, meaning that it is both pathogenic and mutualistic at the same time.
