= Somena exigua =

Scientific classification
- Domain: Eukaryota
- Kingdom: Animalia
- Phylum: Arthropoda
- Class: Insecta
- Order: Lepidoptera
- Superfamily: Noctuoidea
- Family: Erebidae
- Genus: Somena
- Species: S. exigua

Binomial name
- Somena exigua (Nietner, 1861)

Synonyms
- Trichia exigua Nietner, 1861; Euproctis exigua Nietner, 1861

Species of moth

Somena exigua is a moth in the family Erebidae. It was described by John Nietner in 1861. It is found in Sri Lanka.
