= Miscera conspersa =

Scientific classification
- Kingdom: Animalia
- Phylum: Arthropoda
- Class: Insecta
- Order: Lepidoptera
- Family: Brachodidae
- Genus: Miscera
- Species: M. conspersa

Binomial name
- Miscera conspersa (Turner, 1942)

Synonyms
- Sagalassa conspersa Turner, 1942

Species of moth

Miscera conspersa is a moth in the family Brachodidae. It was described by Turner in 1942. It is found in Australia.
