= Miscera ampla =

Scientific classification
- Domain: Eukaryota
- Kingdom: Animalia
- Phylum: Arthropoda
- Class: Insecta
- Order: Lepidoptera
- Family: Brachodidae
- Genus: Miscera
- Species: M. ampla

Binomial name
- Miscera ampla (Turner, 1942)

Synonyms
- Sagalassa ampla Turner, 1942

Species of moth

Miscera ampla is a moth in the family Brachodidae. It was described by Turner in 1942. It is found in Australia.
