= Miscera homotona =

Scientific classification
- Domain: Eukaryota
- Kingdom: Animalia
- Phylum: Arthropoda
- Class: Insecta
- Order: Lepidoptera
- Family: Brachodidae
- Genus: Miscera
- Species: M. homotona

Binomial name
- Miscera homotona (C. Swinhoe, 1892)

Synonyms
- Sagalassa homotona (C. Swinhoe, 1892); Balataea homotona C. Swinhoe, 1892; Miscera heterozyga Turner, 1913

Species of moth

Miscera homotona is a moth of the family Brachodidae first described by Charles Swinhoe in 1892. It is found in Australia.
