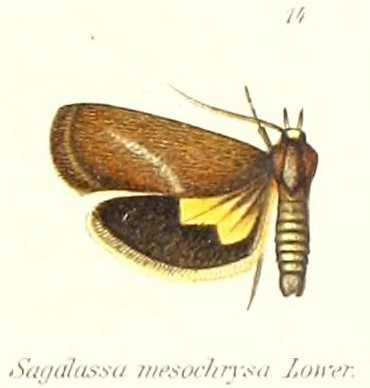

Scientific classification
- Domain: Eukaryota
- Kingdom: Animalia
- Phylum: Arthropoda
- Class: Insecta
- Order: Lepidoptera
- Family: Brachodidae
- Genus: Miscera
- Species: M. mesochrysa

Binomial name
- Miscera mesochrysa (Lower, 1903)

Synonyms
- Atychia mesochrysa Lower, 1903

= Miscera mesochrysa =

Species of moth

Miscera mesochrysa is a moth in the family Brachodidae. It was described by Oswald Bertram Lower in 1903. It is found in Australia.
