= Atractoceros =

Scientific classification
- Kingdom: Animalia
- Phylum: Arthropoda
- Class: Insecta
- Order: Lepidoptera
- Family: Brachodidae
- Genus: Atractoceros; Meyrick, 1936
- Species: A. xanthoprocta

Binomial name
- Atractoceros xanthoprocta (Meyrick, 1926)

Synonyms
- Phycodes xanthoprocta (Meyrick, 1914)

Genus of moths

Atractoceros is a monotypic genus of moths in the subfamily Phycodinae. It contains only the species Atractoceros xanthoprocta. It can be found in South Africa, Malawi, Tanzania, and Mozambique. They have relatively short, narrow wings and large bodies. It is theorized they possibly mimic Hymenoptera due to their transparent hindwings and abdomen patterns.
