= Nigilgia adjectella =

Scientific classification
- Kingdom: Animalia
- Phylum: Arthropoda
- Class: Insecta
- Order: Lepidoptera
- Family: Brachodidae
- Genus: Nigilgia
- Species: N. adjectella

Binomial name
- Nigilgia adjectella Walker, 1863

Synonyms
- Phycodes adjectella

Species of moth

Nigilgia adjectella is a moth in the family Brachodidae. It was described by Francis Walker in 1863. It is found in Sierra Leone, China, India, Sri Lanka and Australia.
