= Miscera centropis =

Scientific classification
- Kingdom: Animalia
- Phylum: Arthropoda
- Class: Insecta
- Order: Lepidoptera
- Family: Brachodidae
- Genus: Miscera
- Species: M. centropis

Binomial name
- Miscera centropis Meyrick, 1907

Species of moth

Miscera centropis is a moth in the family Brachodidae. It was described by Edward Meyrick in 1907. It is found in Australia.
