= Miscera desmotoma =

Scientific classification
- Domain: Eukaryota
- Kingdom: Animalia
- Phylum: Arthropoda
- Class: Insecta
- Order: Lepidoptera
- Family: Brachodidae
- Genus: Miscera
- Species: M. desmotoma

Binomial name
- Miscera desmotoma (Lower, 1896)

Synonyms
- Atychia desmotoma Lower, 1896

Species of moth

Miscera desmotoma is a moth in the family Brachodidae. It was described by Oswald Bertram Lower in 1896. It is found in Australia.
