= Miscera androgyna =

Scientific classification
- Domain: Eukaryota
- Kingdom: Animalia
- Phylum: Arthropoda
- Class: Insecta
- Order: Lepidoptera
- Family: Brachodidae
- Genus: Miscera
- Species: M. androgyna

Binomial name
- Miscera androgyna Turner, 1913

Species of moth

Miscera androgyna is a moth in the family Brachodidae. It was described by Turner in 1913. It is found in Australia.
