= Miscera basichrysa =

Scientific classification
- Domain: Eukaryota
- Kingdom: Animalia
- Phylum: Arthropoda
- Class: Insecta
- Order: Lepidoptera
- Family: Brachodidae
- Genus: Miscera
- Species: M. basichrysa

Binomial name
- Miscera basichrysa (Lower, 1916)

Synonyms
- Sagalassa basichrysa Lower, 1916; Sagalassa poecilota Turner, 1923

Species of moth

Miscera basichrysa is a moth in the family Brachodidae. It was described by Oswald Bertram Lower in 1916. It is found in Australia and New Guinea.

== Subspecies ==
- Miscera basichrysa basichrysa
- Miscera basichrysa extensa Kallies, 1998 (New Guinea)
