= Miscera resumptana =

Scientific classification
- Kingdom: Animalia
- Phylum: Arthropoda
- Class: Insecta
- Order: Lepidoptera
- Family: Brachodidae
- Genus: Miscera
- Species: M. resumptana

Binomial name
- Miscera resumptana Walker, 1863

Synonyms
- Atychia anthomera Lower, 1896

Species of moth

Miscera resumptana is a moth in the family Brachodidae. It was described by Francis Walker in 1863. It is found in Australia.
