= Miscera isomacha =

Scientific classification
- Kingdom: Animalia
- Phylum: Arthropoda
- Class: Insecta
- Order: Lepidoptera
- Family: Brachodidae
- Genus: Miscera
- Species: M. isomacha

Binomial name
- Miscera isomacha (Meyrick, 1925)

Synonyms
- Sagalassa isomacha Meyrick, 1925

Species of moth

Miscera isomacha is a moth in the family Brachodidae. It was described by Edward Meyrick in 1925. It is found in Australia.
