= Miscera ambigua =

Scientific classification
- Domain: Eukaryota
- Kingdom: Animalia
- Phylum: Arthropoda
- Class: Insecta
- Order: Lepidoptera
- Family: Brachodidae
- Genus: Miscera
- Species: M. ambigua

Binomial name
- Miscera ambigua (Turner, 1942)

Synonyms
- Sagalassa ambigua Turner, 1942

Species of moth

Miscera ambigua is a moth in the family Brachodidae. It was described by Turner in 1942. It is found in Australia.
