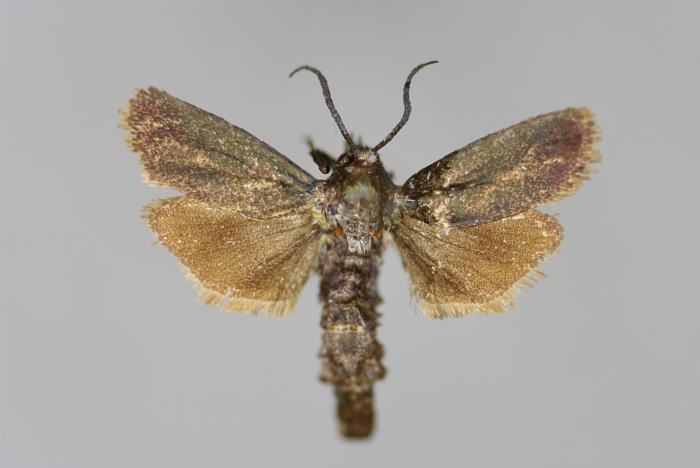
- Brachodes appendiculata

Scientific classification
- Domain: Eukaryota
- Kingdom: Animalia
- Phylum: Arthropoda
- Class: Insecta
- Order: Lepidoptera
- Superfamily: Cossoidea
- Family: Brachodidae; Agenjo, 1966

Genera
- See text

Synonyms
- Atychiidae; Bradyptesidae

= Brachodidae =

Family of moths

Brachodidae is a family of day-flying moths, commonly known as little bear moths, which contains about 135 species distributed around much of the world (Edwards et al. 1999). The relationships and status of the presently included genera are not well understood.

== Genera ==
- Subfamily Brachodinae Agenjo, 1966
  - Atractoceros Meyrick, 1936
  - Brachodes
  - Euthorybeta
  - Miscera
  - Saccocera Kallies, 2013
  - Synechodes
- Subfamily Phycodinae Rebel, 1907
  - Nigilgia
  - Paranigilgia Kallies, 1998
  - Phycodes (syn: Tegna)
  - Phycodopteryx Kallies, 2004
- Unknown
  - Hoplophractis
  - Sagalassa
  - Sisyroctenis

== Formerly placed here ==
- Pseudocossus
