= False dittany =

False dittany is a common name for several plants and may refer to:

- Ballota acetabulosa
- Ballota pseudodictamnus
- Pseudodictamnus mediterraneus

== See also ==
- Dittany
