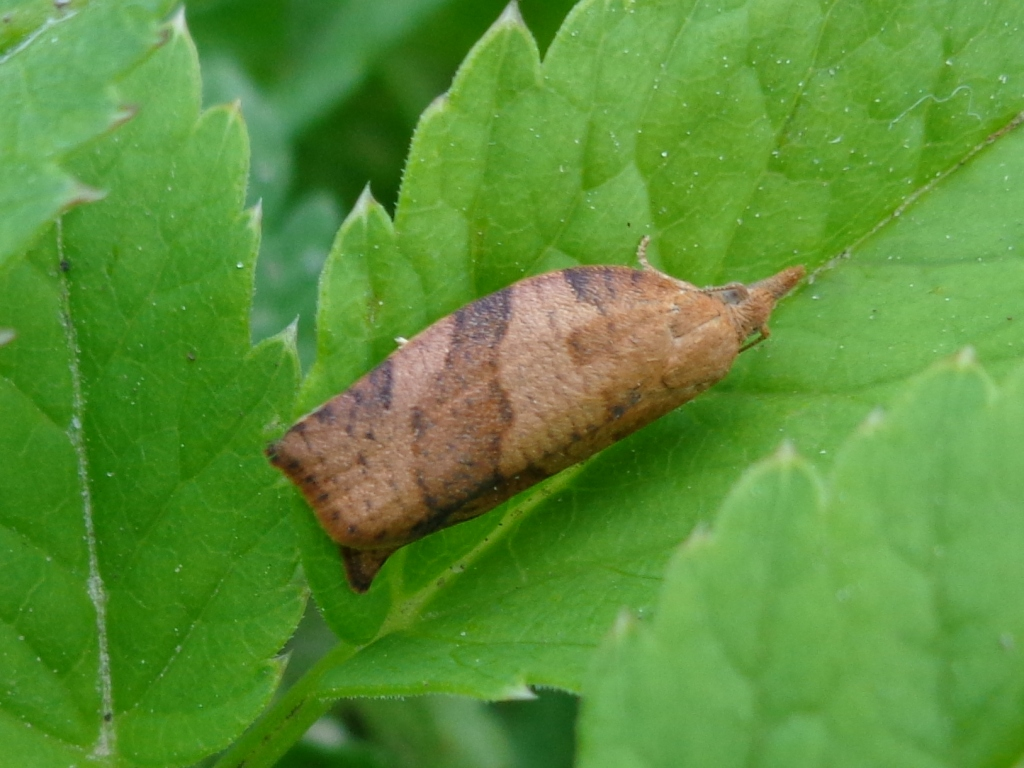

Scientific classification
- Domain: Eukaryota
- Kingdom: Animalia
- Phylum: Arthropoda
- Class: Insecta
- Order: Lepidoptera
- Family: Tortricidae
- Genus: Pandemis
- Species: P. dumetana

Binomial name
- Pandemis dumetana (Treitschke, 1825)

Synonyms
- Tortrix dumetana Treitschke, 1825; Pandemis gravana Caradja, 1932

= Pandemis dumetana =

Species of moth

Pandemis dumetana is a species of moth of the family Tortricidae. It is found in China (Heilongjiang, Jilin, Beijing, Hubei, Sichuan, Qinghai, Yunnan), South Korea, Japan, Russia, northern India, almost all of Europe, Asia Minor, Iran, southern Siberia and Transcaucasia. The habitat consists of woodlands, fruit farms, orchards and gardens.

The wingspan is 18–20 mm for males and 19–22 mm for females. Adults are on wing from June to August.

The larvae feed on Cerylus heterophyllus, Chenopodium album, Dictamnus dasycarpus, Fraxinus mandshurica, Glycine max, Juglans mandschurica, Lysimachia clethroides, Malus pumila, Mentha, Parthenocissus tricuspidata, Sanguisarba officinalis, Spiraea salicifolia, Thalictrum and Agastache rugosus.
