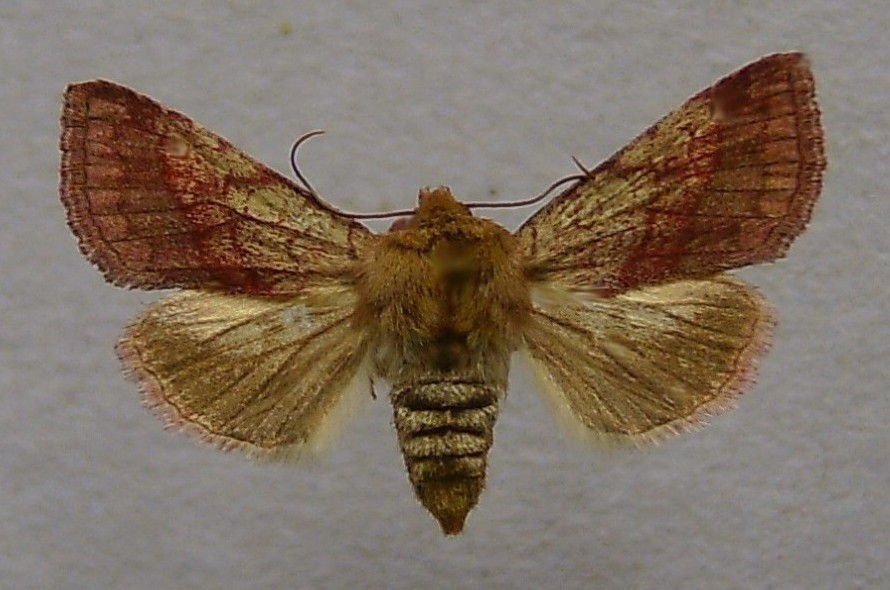

Scientific classification
- Domain: Eukaryota
- Kingdom: Animalia
- Phylum: Arthropoda
- Class: Insecta
- Order: Lepidoptera
- Superfamily: Noctuoidea
- Family: Noctuidae
- Genus: Pyrrhia
- Species: P. purpurina

Binomial name
- Pyrrhia purpurina (Esper, 1804)

Synonyms
- Phalaena (Noctua) purpurina Esper, 1804

= Pyrrhia purpurina =

Species of moth

Pyrrhia purpurina is a moth of the family Noctuidae. It is found from the warm areas of eastern Austria, the Czech Republic, Slovakia, Hungary and further into eastern Europe, up to Ukraine.

The wingspan is 27–35 mm. Adults are on wing in May.

The larvae feed on Dictamnus albus.
