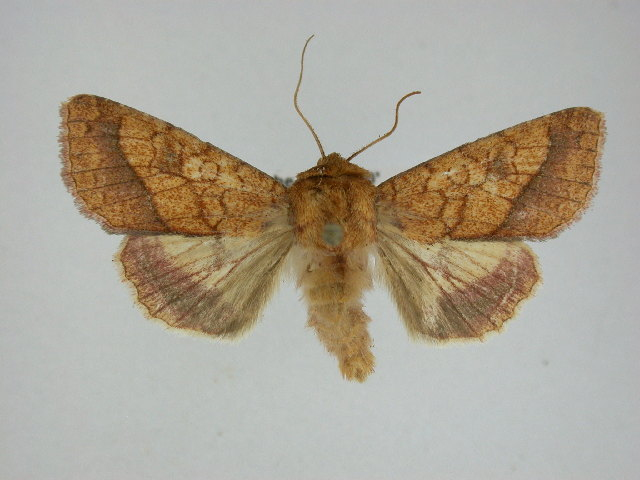

Scientific classification
- Domain: Eukaryota
- Kingdom: Animalia
- Phylum: Arthropoda
- Class: Insecta
- Order: Lepidoptera
- Superfamily: Noctuoidea
- Family: Noctuidae
- Genus: Pyrrhia
- Species: P. cilisca

Binomial name
- Pyrrhia cilisca (Guenée, 1852)

Synonyms
- Pyrrhia adela Lafontaine and Mikkola, 1996

= Pyrrhia cilisca =

Species of moth

Pyrrhia cilisca is a moth of the family Noctuidae first described by Achille Guenée in 1852. Pyrrhia adela was placed as a synonym of Pyrrhia cilisca. Pyrrhia adela was introduced as the new scientific name for the North American population of moths which was formerly considered to be Pyrrhia umbra, hence both species have the common name bordered sallow, although adela was also referred to as the American bordered sallow. It is found in North America from Newfoundland west to Manitoba, South Carolina west to Texas.

The wingspan is 32–40 mm. Adults are on wing from May to October.

The larvae feed on alder, cabbage, rose, sumac, walnut and a wide range of other plants.
