= Gas plant =

Gas plant can refer to:

- Dictamnus or "Gas-plant", a flowering plant
- Gas-fired power plant
- Gas turbine power plant
- Gasworks, an industrial plant for the production of flammable gas
- Natural Gas Processing Plant
