= Dittany =

Dittany is a common name for several species of plants and may refer to:

- Dictamnus albus (dittany)
- Pseudodictamnus mediterraneus (false dittany)
- Origanum dictamnus (dittany of Crete, Cretan dittany)
- Cunila origanoides (dittany, American dittany)
