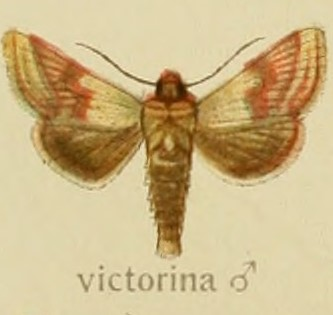

Scientific classification
- Kingdom: Animalia
- Phylum: Arthropoda
- Class: Insecta
- Order: Lepidoptera
- Superfamily: Noctuoidea
- Family: Noctuidae
- Genus: Pyrrhia
- Species: P. victorina

Binomial name
- Pyrrhia victorina (Sodoffsky, 1849)

Synonyms
- Heliothis victorina Sodoffsky, 1849; Periphanes victorina (Sodoffsky, 1849); Helivictoria victorina (Sodoffsky, 1849)

= Pyrrhia victorina =

Species of moth

Pyrrhia victorina is a moth of the family Noctuidae. It is found in Bulgaria, Greece, Romania, Slovenia, former Yugoslavia (including Croatia, Serbia, Bosnia and Herzegovina and North Macedonia) and Daghestan.

== Description from Seitz ==
Forewing sulphur yellow: the veins and lines deep rosy purple; a rosy sinuous median shade passing over the discocellular; an outer and a submarginal line, the latter not reaching costa: a fine dark purple terminal line; fringe sulphur yellow; hindwing suffused with blackish fuscous, with darker veins and submarginal band, wholly blackish in female; the fringe white; occurring in S. E. Europe only, Servia, Bulgaria, S. Russia, the Caucasus, Armenia, Asia Minor, and N. Kurdistan; the form described as prazanoffzkyi Guen. (46 h) from Amasia is much paler in both wings, with all the rosy tints much reduced : the underside pale instead of purplish fuscous. — Larva dull green or violet red dorsal line very faint; subdorsal pale, slender, interrupted at the segmental incisions; lateral lines broader, the reddish spiracles placed on their upper margin; tubercles black; head black brown; thoracic plate yellowish: feeding on Dictamnus and Salvia.
