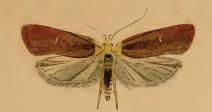

Scientific classification
- Kingdom: Animalia
- Phylum: Arthropoda
- Clade: Pancrustacea
- Class: Insecta
- Order: Lepidoptera
- Family: Depressariidae
- Genus: Agonopterix
- Species: A. furvella

Binomial name
- Agonopterix furvella (Treitschke, 1832)

Synonyms
- Haemylis furvella Treitschke, 1832

= Agonopterix furvella =

Species of moth

Agonopterix furvella is a moth of the family Depressariidae. It is found in France, Germany, Italy, Austria, the Czech Republic, Poland, Slovakia, Hungary, Croatia, Romania, Bulgaria, North Macedonia, Albania, Greece, Ukraine and Russia.

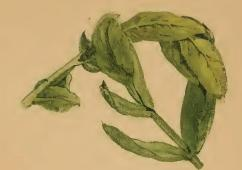
Leaves of Dictamnus albus united by larva

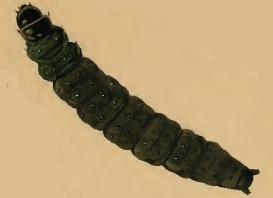
Larva

The wingspan is 23–28 mm.

The larvae feed on Dictamnus albus.
