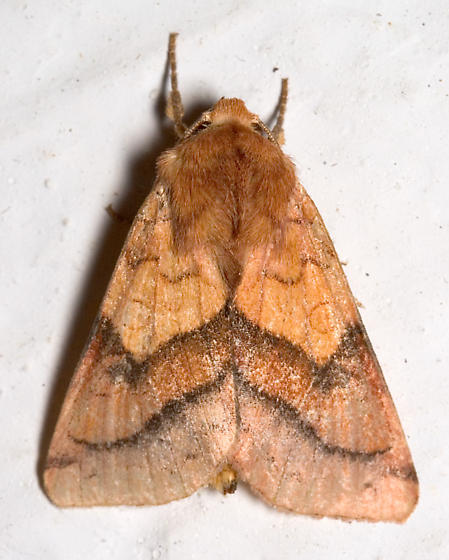
- Adult
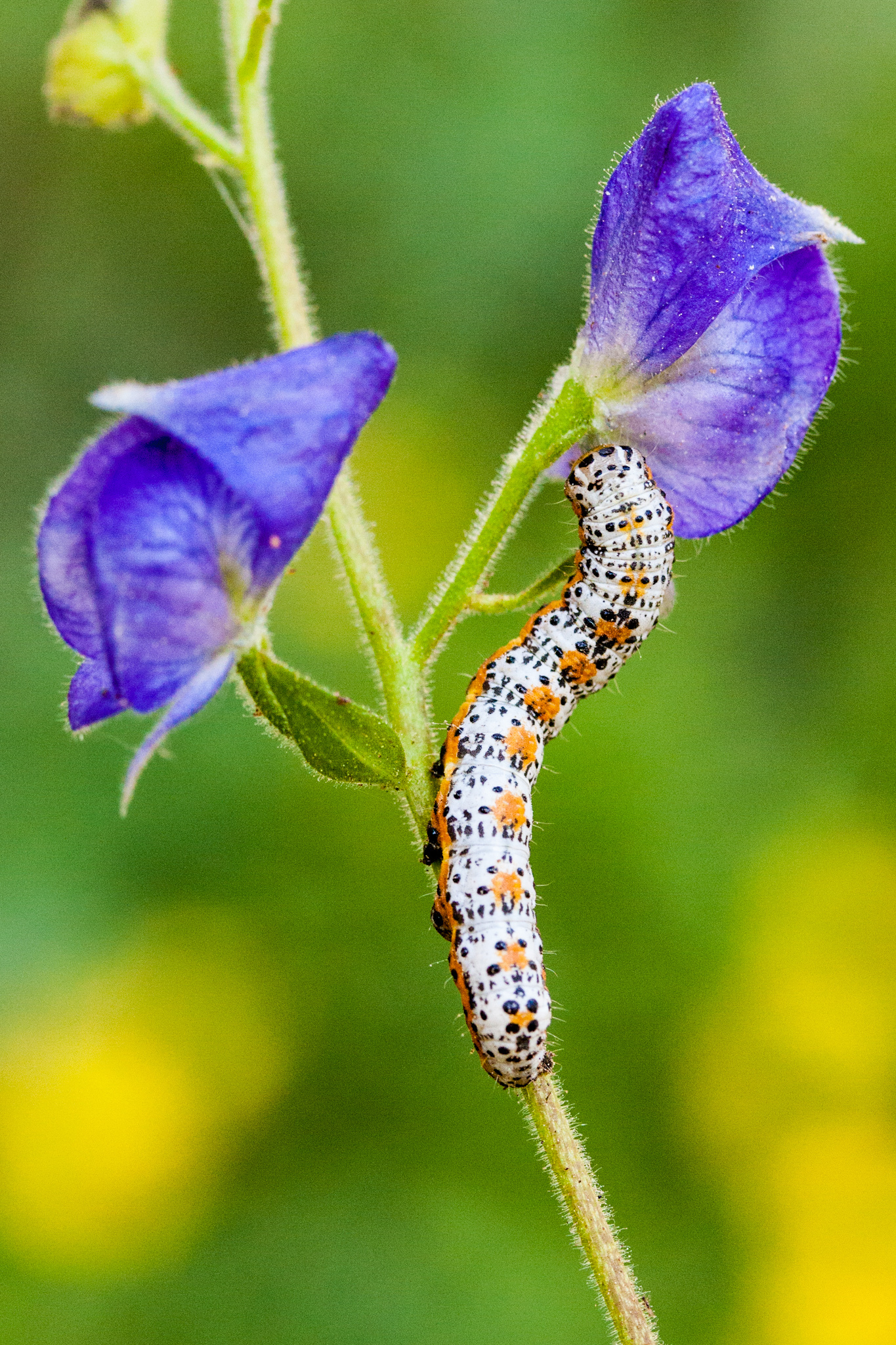
- Larva on Columbian monkshood (Aconitum columbianum)

Scientific classification
- Kingdom: Animalia
- Phylum: Arthropoda
- Class: Insecta
- Order: Lepidoptera
- Superfamily: Noctuoidea
- Family: Noctuidae
- Genus: Pyrrhia
- Species: P. exprimens

Binomial name
- Pyrrhia exprimens (Walker, 1857)

Synonyms
- Heliothis exprimens Walker, 1857; Pyrrhia angulata Grote, 1874; Pyrrhia stilla Grote, 1879

= Pyrrhia exprimens =

Species of moth

Pyrrhia exprimens, the purple-lined sallow, is a moth of the family Noctuidae. The species was first described by Francis Walker (entomologist) in 1857. In North America it is found from Newfoundland and Labrador west across southern Canada to southern Vancouver Island, south to Texas, Arizona and California. Outside of North America it is found in Finland, the West Siberian Plain, the South Siberian Mountains and Kazakhstan.

The wingspan is 35–38 mm. Adults are on wing from May to August.

The larvae feed on Polygonum species and Aconitum septentrionale as well as a wide variety of other plants.
