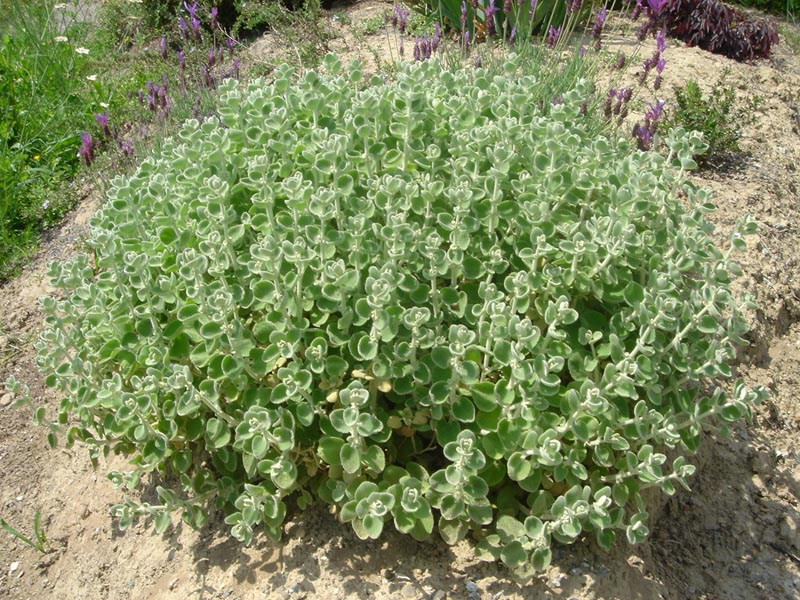

Scientific classification
- Kingdom: Plantae
- Clade: Tracheophytes
- Clade: Angiosperms
- Clade: Eudicots
- Clade: Asterids
- Order: Lamiales
- Family: Lamiaceae
- Genus: Pseudodictamnus
- Species: P. mediterraneus

Binomial name
- Pseudodictamnus mediterraneus Salmaki & Siadati

Synonyms
- Ballota pseudodictamnus (L.) Benth.; Beringeria pseudodictamnus (L.) Neck. ex Link; Marrubium pallidum Salisb.; Marrubium pseudodictamnus L.

= Pseudodictamnus mediterraneus =

Species of flowering plant in the sage family

Pseudodictamnus mediterraneus, the false dittany, is a species of flowering plant in the mint family Lamiaceae. It is native to the southern Aegean region.

== Taxonomy ==
Several common names are attached to this plant, including false dittany, false divinity, and Greek horehound.

=== Etymology ===
The Latin specific epithet pseudodictamnus means "false dittany". In this case, the resemblance is to the classical dittany of Crete, Origanum dictamnus, not to the much more distantly related genus Dictamnus in the family Rutaceae.

== Description ==
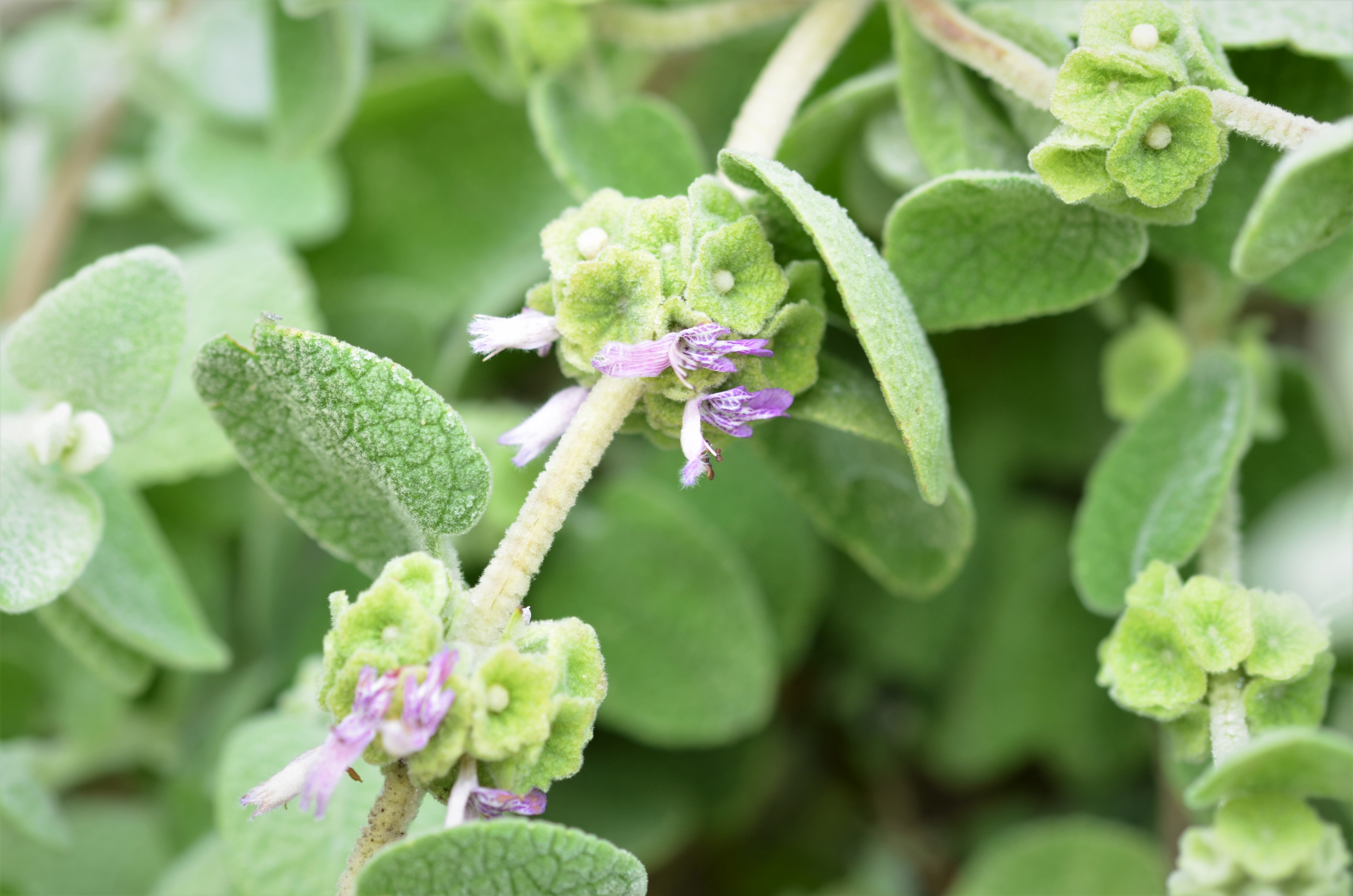
Flowering plant: Small pink and white flowers

A low mound-forming evergreen shrub growing to 50 centimetres (20 in) tall and wide, it bears almost circular, dished, silver-green leaves with a soft felted texture; and masses of pink flowers (which are mostly hidden by the leaves) in late spring and early summer.

It tolerates temperatures as low as −10 °C (14 °F), but requires very dry conditions and sharp drainage in full sun.

== Distribution ==
Pseudodictamnus mediterraneus is native to dry Mediterranean regions in Europe and western Asia, including Greece (South Aegean), Egypt, Libya and Turkey. It is also an introduced species in the British Isles and Italy (Sicily).

== In horticulture ==
In cultivation in the UK, this plant has gained the Royal Horticultural Society's Award of Garden Merit.
