= Pyrrhia bifaciata =

Scientific classification
- Domain: Eukaryota
- Kingdom: Animalia
- Phylum: Arthropoda
- Class: Insecta
- Order: Lepidoptera
- Superfamily: Noctuoidea
- Family: Noctuidae
- Genus: Pyrrhia
- Species: P. bifaciata

Binomial name
- Pyrrhia bifaciata (Staudinger, 1888)

Synonyms
- Grammesia bifasciata Staudinger 1888; Calymnia pryeri Leech 1888; Heliothis olivaria Graeser 1888

Species of moth

Pyrrhia bifaciata is a moth of the family Noctuidae. It is found in China, Japan (Hokkaido, Honshu and Shikoku), the Russian Far East (the Primorye region, the Amur region, southern Khabarovsk and southern Sakhalin), Taiwan and on the Korean Peninsula
