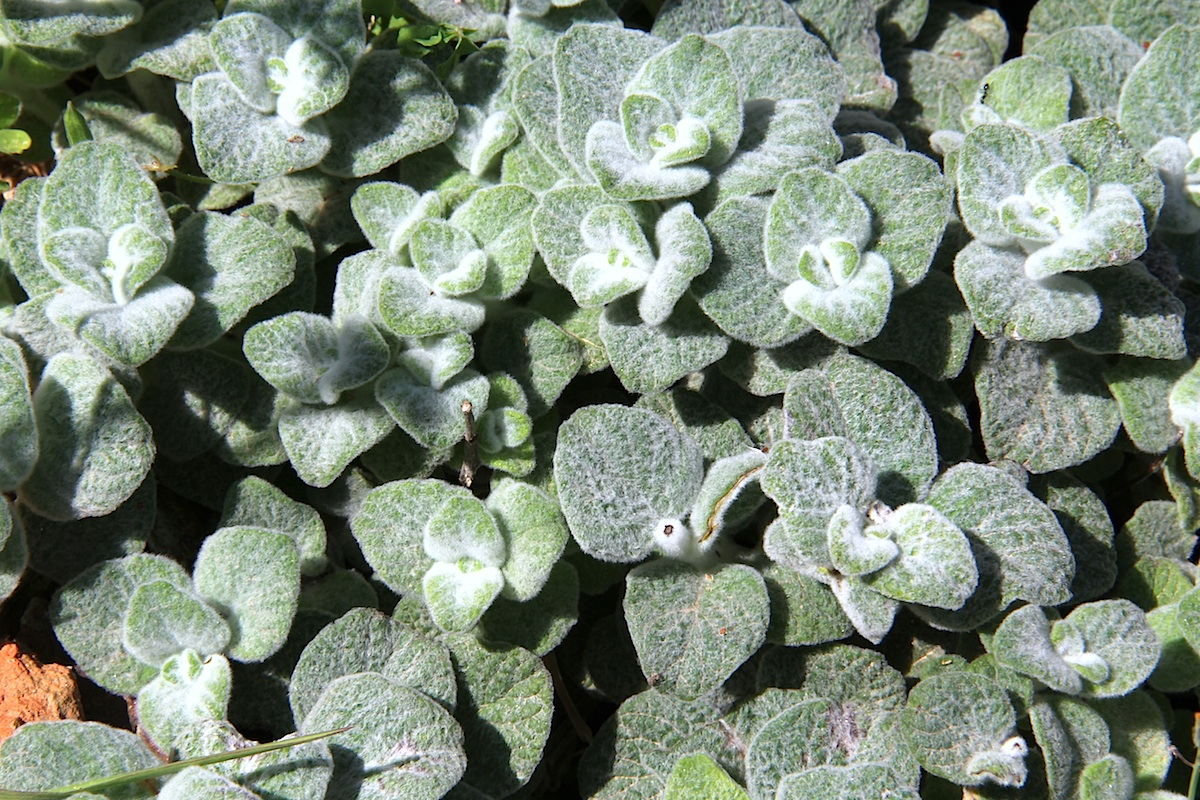

Scientific classification
- Kingdom: Plantae
- Clade: Tracheophytes
- Clade: Angiosperms
- Clade: Eudicots
- Clade: Asterids
- Order: Lamiales
- Family: Lamiaceae
- Genus: Origanum
- Species: O. dictamnus

Binomial name
- Origanum dictamnus L.

Synonyms
- Amaracus dictamnus (L.) Benth.; Amaracus tomentosus Moench; Dictamnus creticus Garsault nom. inval.; Majorana dictamnus (L.) Kostel.; Origanum dictamnifolium St.-Lag. [Spelling variant]; Origanum saxatile Salisb. nom. illeg.

= Origanum dictamnus =

Species of flowering plant

Origanum dictamnus, the dittany of Crete, Cretan dittany or hop marjoram, is a tender perennial plant that grows 20–30 cm high. It is known in Greek as δίκταμο (díktamo, cf. "dittany") or in the Cretan dialect as έρωντας (erontas; eros, love). It is a therapeutic and aromatic plant that grows wild only on the mountainsides and gorges of the Greek island of Crete. It is widely used for food flavouring and medicinal purposes, in addition to featuring as an ornamental plant in gardens. This small, lanate shrub is easily recognised by the distinctive soft, woolly covering of white-grey hair on its stems and round green leaves, giving it a velvety texture. Its tiny rose-pink flowers are surrounded by brighter purple-pink bracts in summer and autumn. The dittany is classified as vulnerable on the IUCN Red List of Threatened Plant Species 1997.

== Description ==
Origanum dictamnus is a many-branched plant with discoid to ovate, grey-green leaves that are sited in pairs opposite each other. The slender, arching stems and lanate leaves are covered in a velvety white down and are 13–25 mm in size.

The flowers are pale pink to purple and have a deep lilac corolla with many deep, pink-coloured, overlapping bracts. The colourful flowers forming a cascade of elongated clusters are in bloom in the summer. The flowers are hermaphroditic, meaning they have both male and female organs, and are pollinated by bees attracted to their scent and bright colour.

The primary ingredients of its essential oil were found to be carvacrol (68.96%), β-phellandrene (18.34%), and p-cymene (4.68%).

== History ==
In antiquity, the herb was used to flavor wine, decorate temples and gardens, and a medicinal panacea and aphrodisiac.

Even in recent times, the collection of dittany of Crete was a very dangerous occupation for the women and men who risked life and limb to climb precarious rock faces where the plant grows wild in the mountains of Crete. They were named erontades, from the local common name for the plant (sic. above).

Dittany of Crete has always been highly prized; it is gathered while in bloom in the summer, and is exported for use in pharmaceuticals, perfumery, and flavouring in drinks such as vermouth and absinthe.

In Ancient Greece, Hippocrates prescribed plant cures to aid all manner of ailments, and considered dittany of Crete useful for stomach aches and complaints of the digestive system and as a poultice for healing wounds, as well as inducing menstruation.

Greek philosopher Aristotle in his work The History of Animals (612a4) wrote: "Wild goats in Crete are said, when wounded by arrow, to go in search of dittany, which is supposed to have the property of ejecting arrows in the body."

Greek scholar and philosopher Theophrastus agreed with Aristotle about the healing properties of dittany of Crete. In his work Enquiry into Plants, he noted that dittany was peculiar to Crete, and that it was "said to be true, that, if goats eat it when they have been shot, it rids them of the arrow" (9.16.1).

Other scholars of Ancient Greece and later have made reference to dittany, but probably referred to Dictamnus albus, known as false or white dittany.

Today, the wild, naturally grown dittany of Crete is classed as "rare" and is protected by European law, so it does not become extinct. The cultivation now centres on Embaros and the surrounding villages, south of Heraklion, Crete, and is used to make herbal tea and for use in natural beauty products.

== Fiction ==
In Book XII.411–415 of Virgil's Aeneid (29-19 BC), Venus heals the wounded Aeneas with dittany: “Hereupon Venus, smitten by her son’s cruel pain, with a mother’s care plucks from Cretan Ida a dittany stalk, [dictamnum genetrix Cretaea carpit ab Ida (412)] clothed with downy leaves and purple flowers; not unknown is that herb to wild goats, when winged arrows have lodged in their flanks.” (Loeb translation).

In Sonnet XCIII of Gaspara Stampa’s Rime, published posthumously in 1554, Stampa uses dittany as a metaphor for her lover Count Collaltino di Collalto: Egli è’l Dittamo mio, egli risana / La piaga mia (lines 12-13).

In Canto XI of Torquato Tasso's Jerusalem Delivered (1581), Godfrey, leader of the First Crusade and the first ruler of the Kingdom of Jerusalem, is healed by a dittany salve. This scene is a reference to Virgil's, as the dittany used to heal Godfrey is fetched from Mount Ida, and reference is also made to the idea that goats eat dittany when wounded.

Charles Baudelaire, in the 1857 poem Tout entière, the 43rd poem in his collection Les Fleurs du Mal, describes his lover as consisting entirely of dittany: Elle tout est dictame (line 11), "she is entirely dittany," referring to the literary tradition of Virgil and Tasso, except that the wound Baudelaire suffers from is not as literal as those that plague Aeneas or Godfrey.

The plant helps to save the life of a character in the 1962 novel The Moon-Spinners, by Mary Stewart.

In J. K. Rowling's Harry Potter and the Deathly Hallows (2007), Hermione Granger uses dittany to cure Ron Weasley after he was "splinched" while apparating. Later, it was used to heal burns after Harry, Hermione, and Ron were injured in their raid on Bellatrix Lestrange's vault.

The 2017 romance novel The Honey Farm on the Hill, by Jo Thomas, takes place in Crete and is essentially all about the preservation of the plant.

In Madeline Miller's 2018 mythic fantasy novel Circe, the witch Circe finds dittany, described as the "queen of healing", amongst other ingredients on Mount Dicte to create a binding charm that would reduce the insatiable hunger of the Minotaur to three months of the year.

== Aroma profile ==
- Carvacrol
- Cymene
- Thymol

== Toxicology ==
- Antimicrobial activity against Listeria monocytogenes
