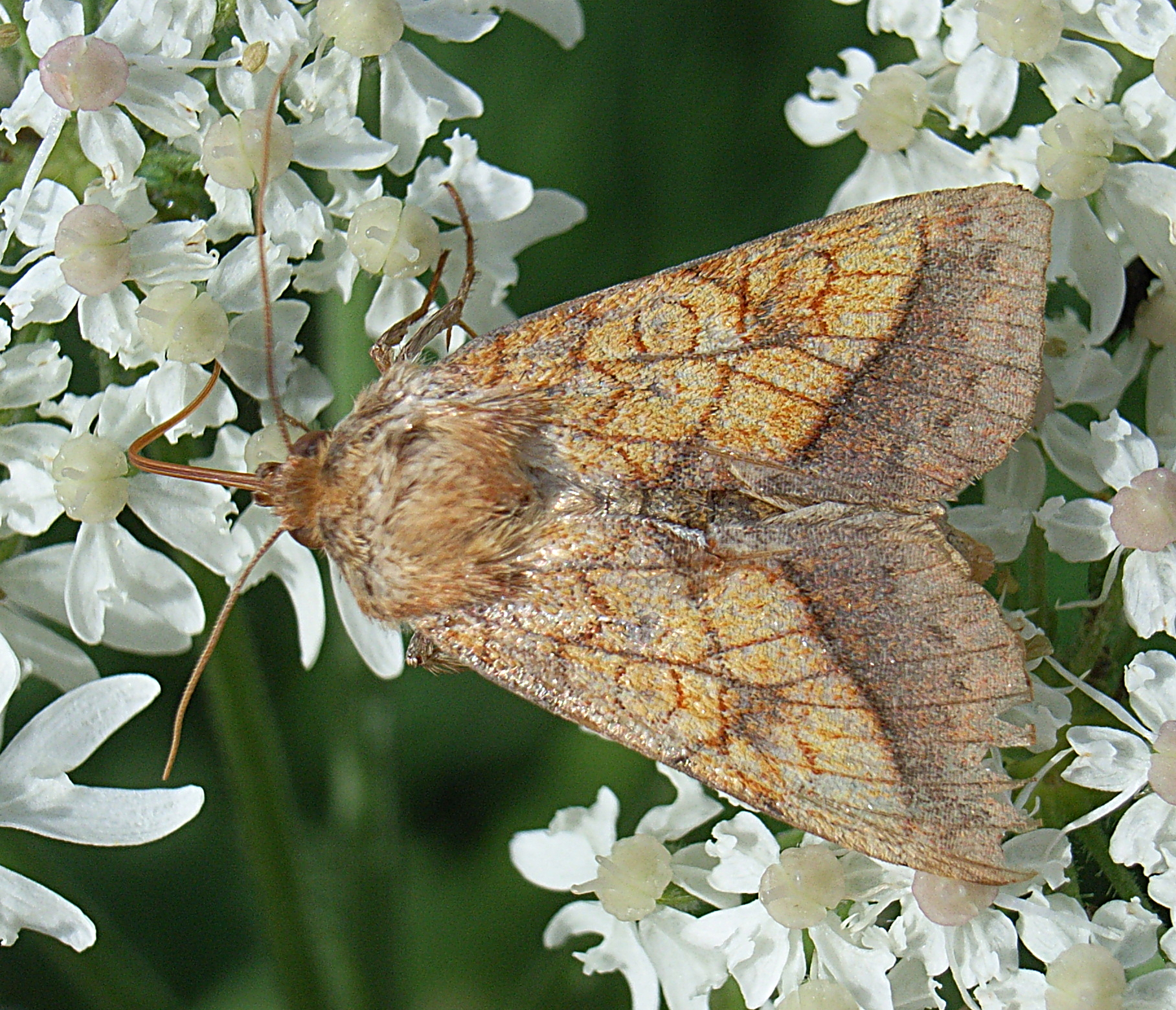
- Pyrrhia umbra

Scientific classification
- Kingdom: Animalia
- Phylum: Arthropoda
- Clade: Pancrustacea
- Class: Insecta
- Order: Lepidoptera
- Superfamily: Noctuoidea
- Family: Noctuidae
- Subfamily: Heliothinae
- Genus: Pyrrhia; Hübner, 1821

= Pyrrhia =

Genus of moths

Pyrrhia is a genus of moths of the family Noctuidae.

== Species ==
- Pyrrhia bifaciata (Staudinger, 1888)
- Pyrrhia cilisca (Guenée, 1852)
- Pyrrhia exprimens (Walker, 1857)
- Pyrrhia hedemanni (Staudinger, 1892)
- Pyrrhia purpurina (Esper, 1804)
- Pyrrhia treitschkei (Frivaldszky, 1835)
- Pyrrhia umbra (Hufnagel, 1766)
- Pyrrhia victorina (Sodoffsky, 1849)
