= Dictamnus angustifolius =

Scientific classification
- Kingdom: Plantae
- Clade: Tracheophytes
- Clade: Angiosperms
- Clade: Eudicots
- Clade: Rosids
- Order: Sapindales
- Family: Rutaceae
- Genus: Dictamnus
- Species: D. angustifolius

Binomial name
- Dictamnus angustifolius G.Don ex Sweet

Synonyms
- Dictamnus albus subsp. turkestanicus N. A. Winter

Species of plant

Dictamnus angustifolius is a species of flowering plant in the family Rutaceae. According to modern concepts, the synonym of the species is Dictamnus albus.

== Distribution and ecology ==
The range of the species covers Central Asia and Mountain Altai.

It grows in steppe meadows, among bush thickets, on grassy and bushy slopes in the middle mountain belt.

== Description ==
Stem more or less densely pubescent, 50 – 100 cm high.

Leaves are odd-pinnate. Leaflets 3-7 pairs, usually large, oblong or oblong-elliptic, long-drawn out toward the apex, acute, finely serrate along the margin; terminal on a winged petiole, wedge-drawn out toward the base.

Inflorescence racemose, less often paniculate-racemose. Bract and linear-lanceolate, acute. Sepal and lanceolate, acute, 7–8 mm long; petals lilac-pink, with purple veins, 3.5-4.5 mm long, lanceolate or oblong, acute or obtuse.

Seeds 4–5 mm long, shiny, dark brown.

== Meaning and use ==
The plant is poisonous. It has an unpleasant odor. When touched, the plant hairs cause severe, blistering skin burns in animals. The fresh plant contains 0.05-0.07% essential oil, consisting of anethole and methyl chavilol. The oil is suitable for obtaining drying oil.

Minor honey plant.

== Taxonomy ==
The species Dictamnus angustifolia belongs to the genus Dictamnus of the family Rutaceae.
