= Pyrrhia hedemanni =

Scientific classification
- Domain: Eukaryota
- Kingdom: Animalia
- Phylum: Arthropoda
- Class: Insecta
- Order: Lepidoptera
- Superfamily: Noctuoidea
- Family: Noctuidae
- Genus: Pyrrhia
- Species: P. hedemanni

Binomial name
- Pyrrhia hedemanni (Staudinger, 1892)

Synonyms
- Chariclea hedemanni Staudinger, 1892; Chariclea erubescens Graeser, 1892; Pyrrhia abrasa Draudt, 1892

Species of moth

Pyrrhia hedemanni is a moth of the family Noctuidae. It is found on the Korean Peninsula and in northern China, Russian Far East (the Primorye region, Khabarovsk and the Amur region).
