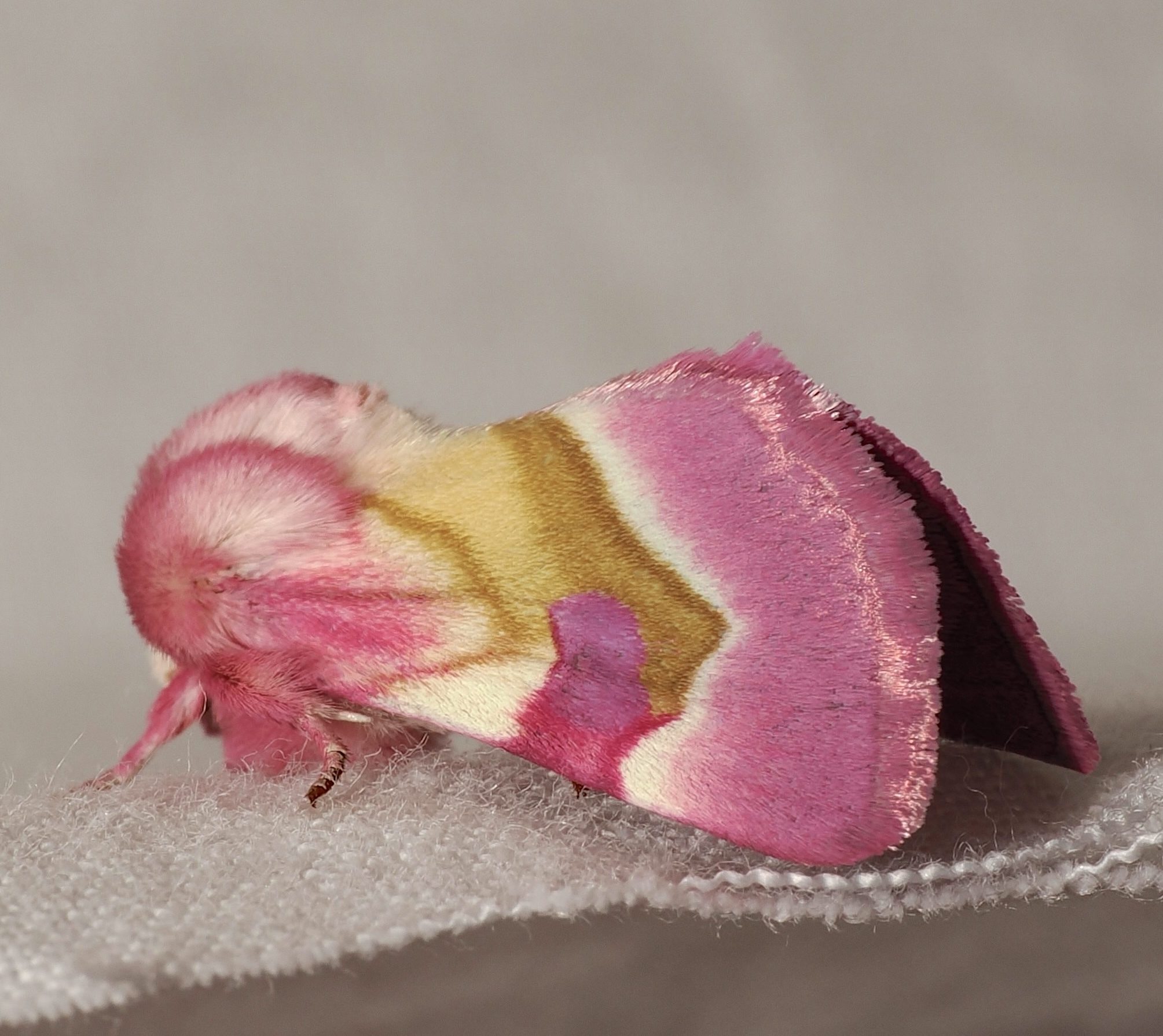

Scientific classification
- Kingdom: Animalia
- Phylum: Arthropoda
- Clade: Pancrustacea
- Class: Insecta
- Order: Lepidoptera
- Superfamily: Noctuoidea
- Family: Noctuidae
- Genus: Pyrrhia
- Species: P. treitschkei

Binomial name
- Pyrrhia treitschkei (Frivaldszky, 1835)

Synonyms
- Periphanes treitschkei Frivaldsky, 1835; Heliothis treitschkii Frivaldszky, 1835; Calocharia treitschkii Frivaldszky, 1835; Philareta treitschkei Frivaldszky, 1835

= Pyrrhia treitschkei =

Species of moth

Pyrrhia treitschkei is a moth of the family Noctuidae. It is found in Turkey, the Caucasus, the Balkans, Iran and the Levant (only recorded from Lebanon and Israel).

Adults are on wing from May to June. There is one generation per year.

The larvae feed on Scutellaria peregrina.
