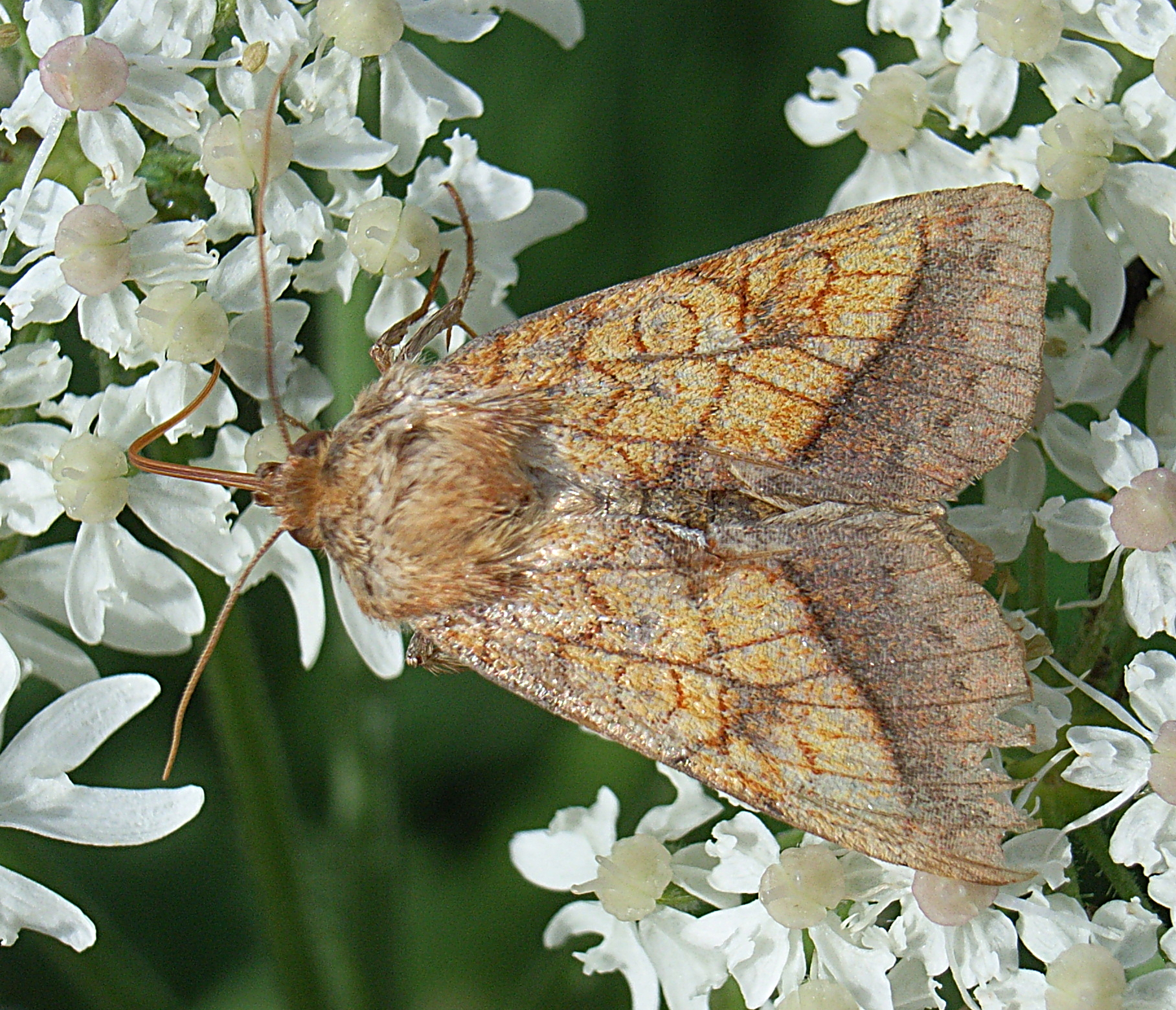

Scientific classification
- Kingdom: Animalia
- Phylum: Arthropoda
- Clade: Pancrustacea
- Class: Insecta
- Order: Lepidoptera
- Superfamily: Noctuoidea
- Family: Noctuidae
- Genus: Pyrrhia
- Species: P. umbra

Binomial name
- Pyrrhia umbra (Hufnagel, 1766)

= Pyrrhia umbra =

Bordered sallow

Species of moth

Pyrrhia umbra, the bordered sallow, is a moth of the family Noctuidae. The species was first described by Johann Siegfried Hufnagel in 1766. It is found in all of Europe, east through Anatolia to Iran, Afghanistan, Pakistan and Nepal and through central Asia to Japan. In mountains it can be found up to elevations of 1,600 meters.

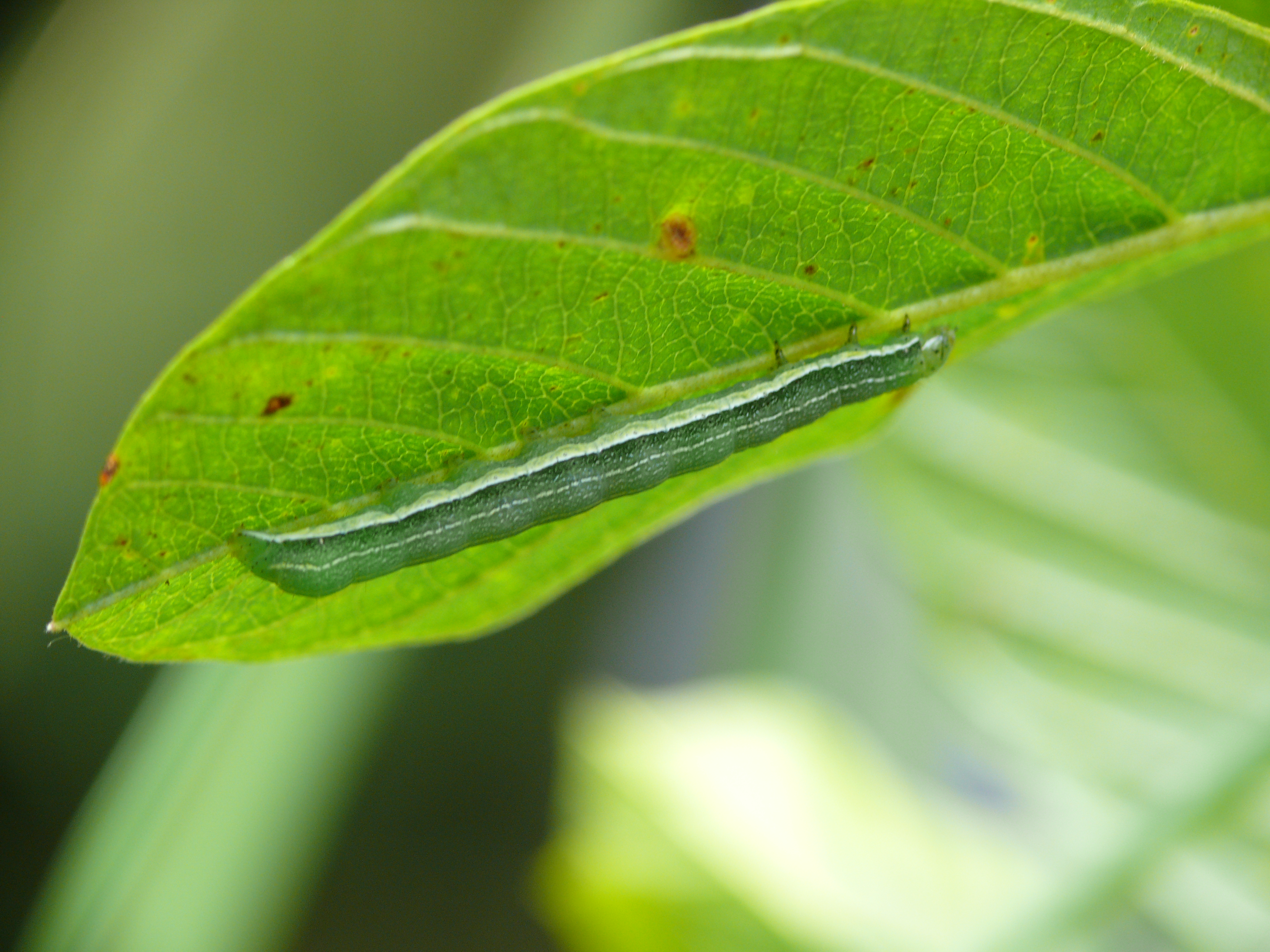
Larva

== Technical description and variation ==
The wingspan is 27–35 mm. The length of the forewings is 16–19 mm. The forewings are a deep olive yellow, faintly dark dusted, from the base to the outer line, beyond which the terminal area is purplish grey, paling towards the termen; the lines bright brown; the inner angled inwards on the veins and outwards between them; the outer stronger, oblique and slightly sinuous from the subcostal bend, generally followed by a purplish-grey shade; median shade bent on median vein: submarginal line lunulate-dentate, dark brown, the area beyond it often golden brown; orbicular and reniform of the ground colour, with brown outlines and brownish centres; the claviform outlined only; hindwing straw yellow; with broad black terminal border, dark cellspot, and pale fringe; — ab. marginata is a paler yellow form, with the termen of both wings paler, and the dark centre of the reniform stigma prominent; a rare aberration, in which the base of forewing is darkened, is called rutilago Haw.

== Biology ==
The moth flies from May to September depending on location.

Larva green to reddish brown, mottled with yellowish, and dotted with black; dorsal line dark, white edged; subdorsal lines fine, yellowish white; lateral lines white or yellow; head pale brown. The larvae feed on Ononis, fireweed and Honckenya peploides, but also deciduous trees, shrubs and other herbaceous plants- vetch Viciaspp., Linaria spp., Antirrhinum spp.

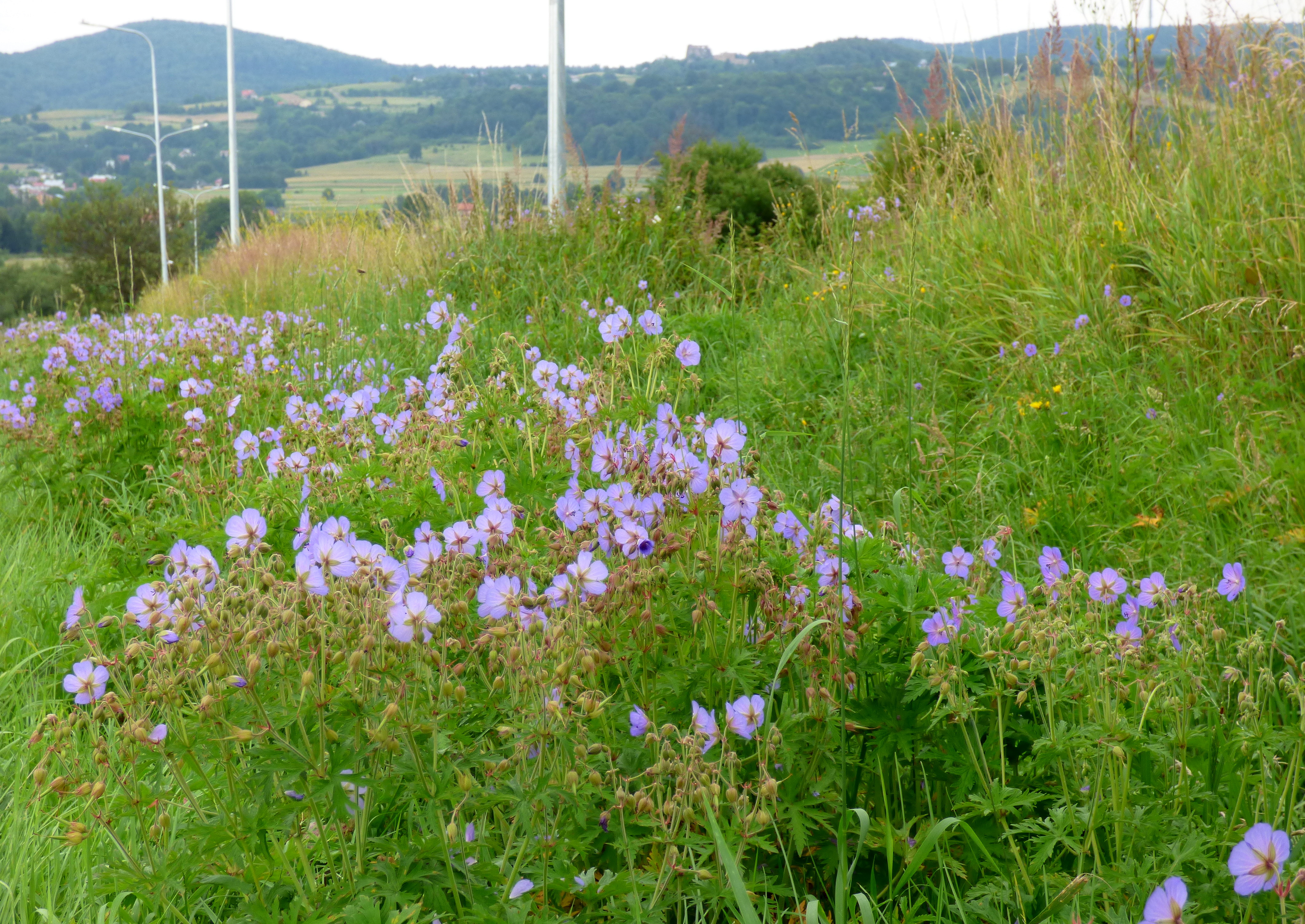
Habitat
