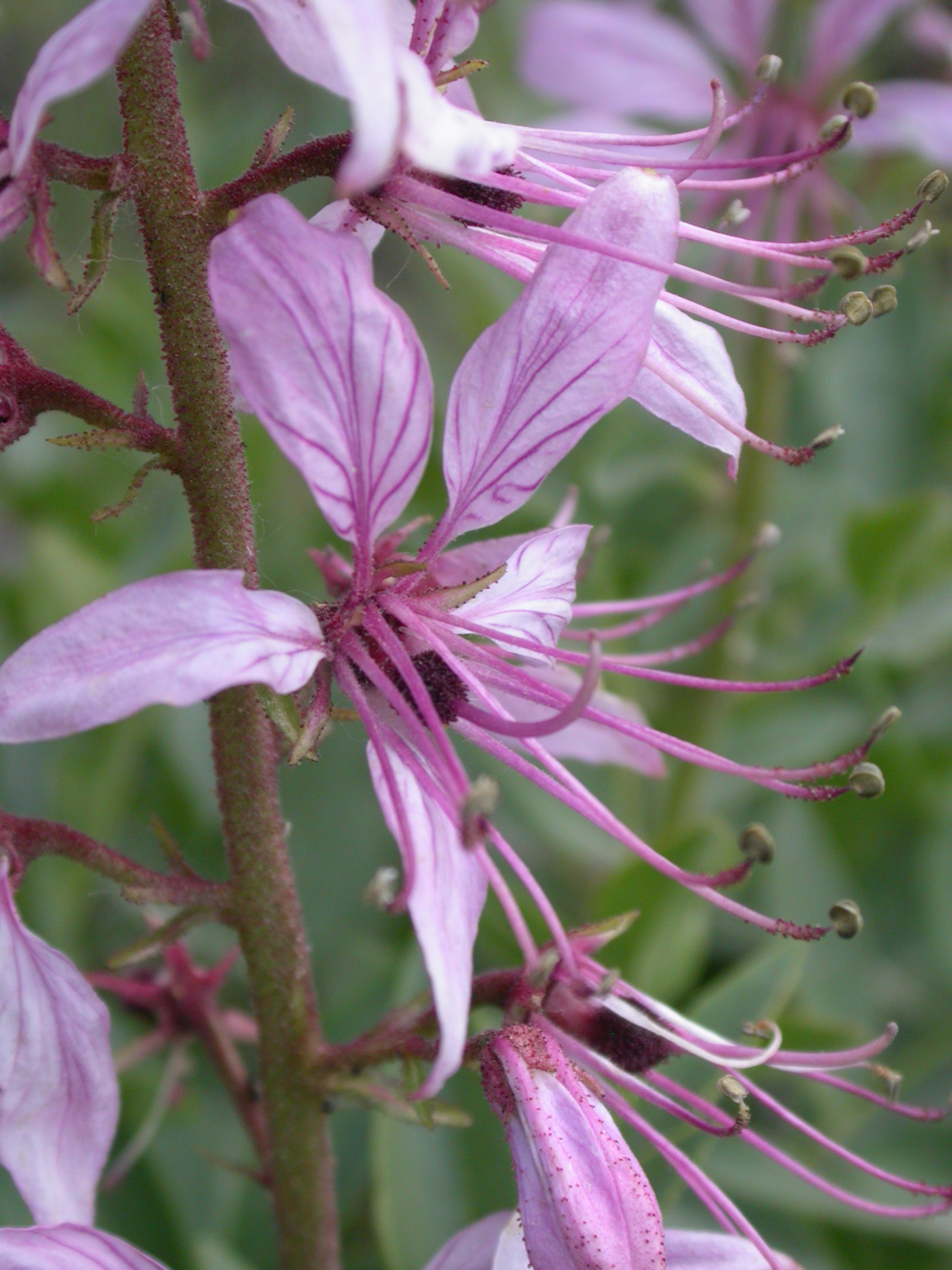

Scientific classification
- Kingdom: Plantae
- Clade: Embryophytes
- Clade: Tracheophytes
- Clade: Spermatophytes
- Clade: Angiosperms
- Clade: Eudicots
- Clade: Rosids
- Order: Sapindales
- Family: Rutaceae
- Genus: Dictamnus
- Species: D. hispanicus

Binomial name
- Dictamnus hispanicus Webb ex Willk.

Synonyms
- Dictamnus albus var. hispanicus; Dictamnus fraxinella var. leptophylla Willk.

= Dictamnus hispanicus =

Species of plant

Dictamnus hispanicus is a species of flowering plant in the family Rutaceae.

== Description ==
It is a very aromatic herbaceous perennial plant that grows to 70 cm tall. Its leaves are compound and light green. The fruit is a capsule.

== Distribution and habitat ==
It is native to the east central and southeast of Spain, as well as Gibraltar and Andorra. It grows in stony terrain and dry forest. The continued collection of this plant by herbalists and its restricted distribution have almost caused its disappearance.

== Taxonomy ==
Dictamnus hispanicus was described by Philip Barker Webb ex Heinrich Moritz Willkomm and published in Suppl. Prodr. Fl. Hispan. 263. 1893.

Etymology

Dictamnus: generic name that comes from the Greek "diktamnos" word composed of dike (mountain of the same name on the island of Crete) and "thamnos" shrub.
