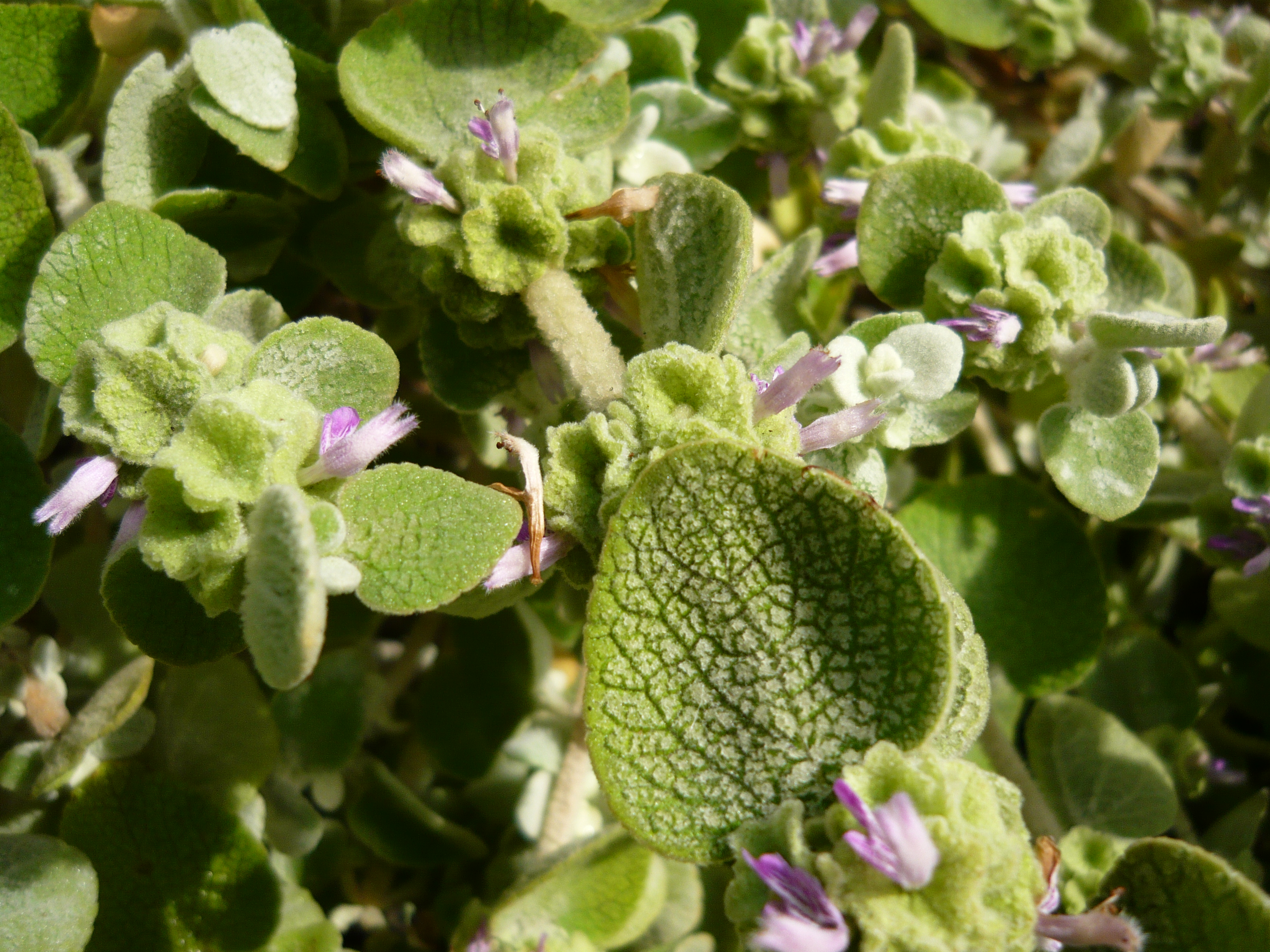

Scientific classification
- Kingdom: Plantae
- Clade: Tracheophytes
- Clade: Angiosperms
- Clade: Eudicots
- Clade: Asterids
- Order: Lamiales
- Family: Lamiaceae
- Genus: Pseudodictamnus
- Species: P. acetabulosus

Binomial name
- Pseudodictamnus acetabulosus (L.) Salmaki & Siadati

Synonyms
- List: Ballota acetabulosa (L.) Benth.; Beringeria acetabulosa (L.) Neck. ex Link; Marrubium acetabulosum L.; Marrubium adfine Spreng.; Marrubium suffruticosum Mill.; Moluccella fruticosa Forssk.

= Pseudodictamnus acetabulosus =

Species of flowering plant in the sage family

Pseudodictamnus acetabulosus, the Greek horehound, is a species of flowering plant in the family Lamiaceae, native to south-eastern Greece, Crete, and western Turkey. It is a compact, evergreen subshrub growing to 0.5 metres (20 in). Upright woolly grey shoots turn to rounded grey-green leaves, bearing whorls of small pink flowers with funnel-shaped green calyces in late summer and autumn. It is tolerant of poor soil and drought, and often used in cultivation as groundcover.

== Gallery ==
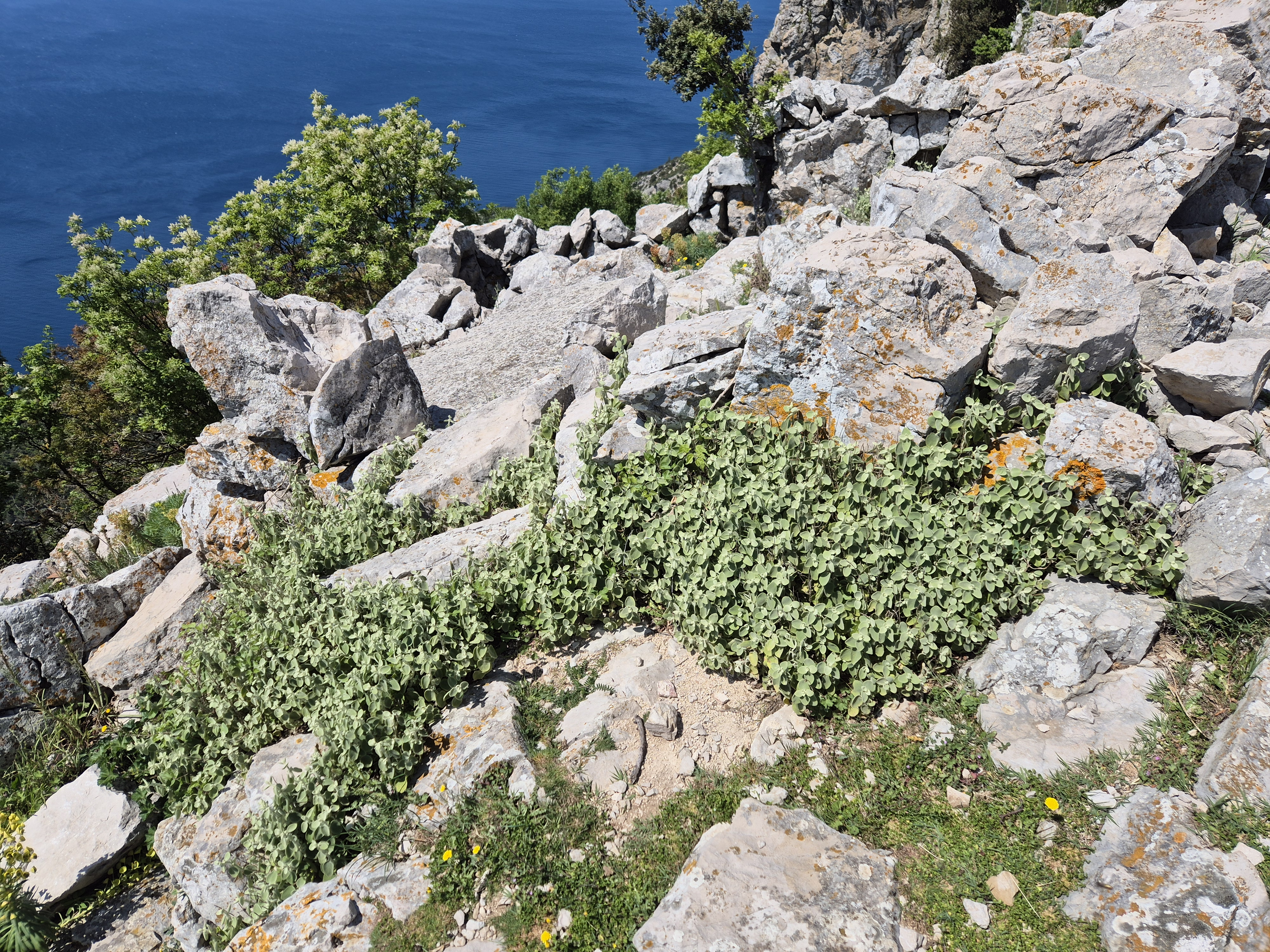
Typical environment

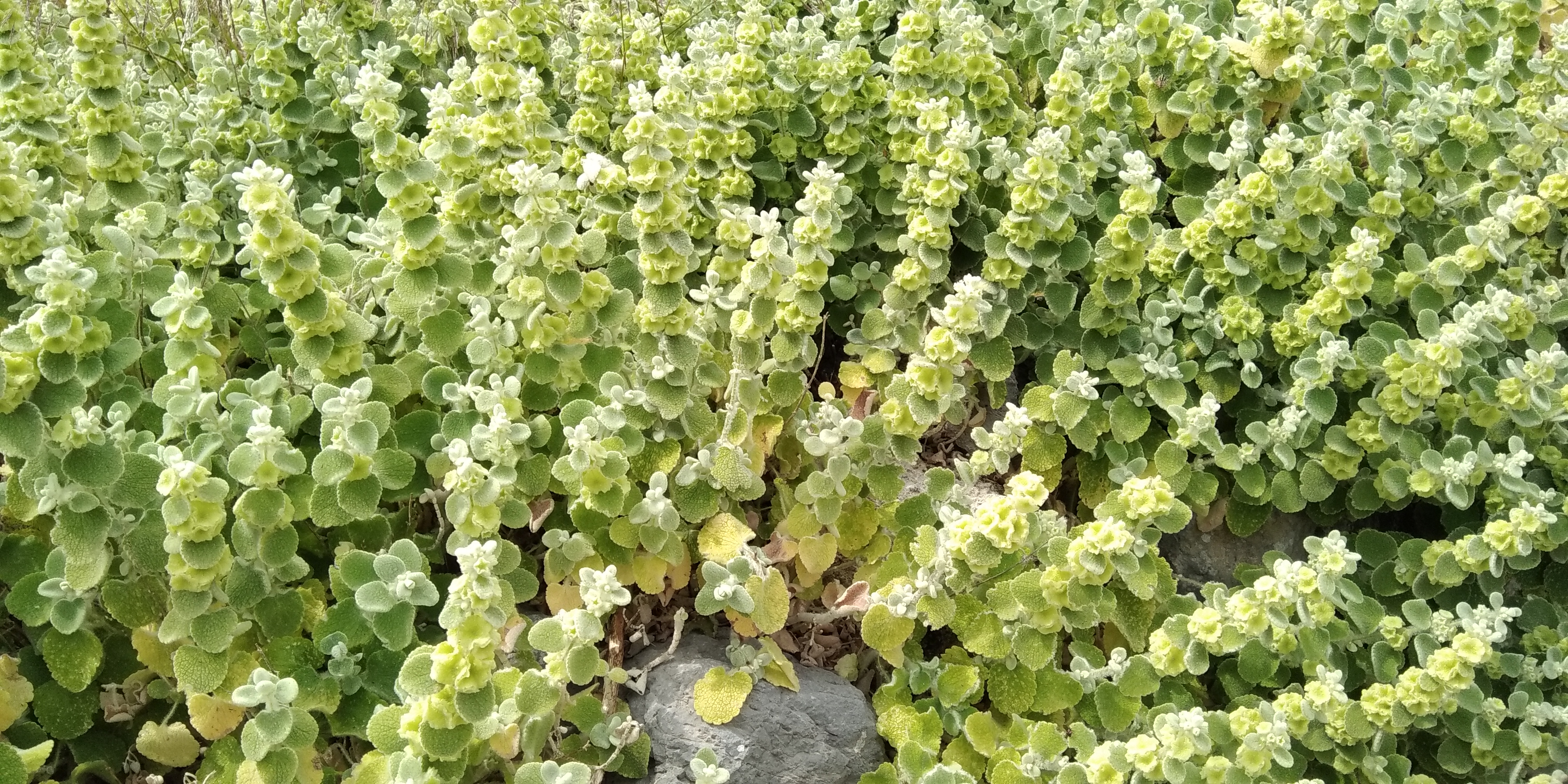
In Monemvasia

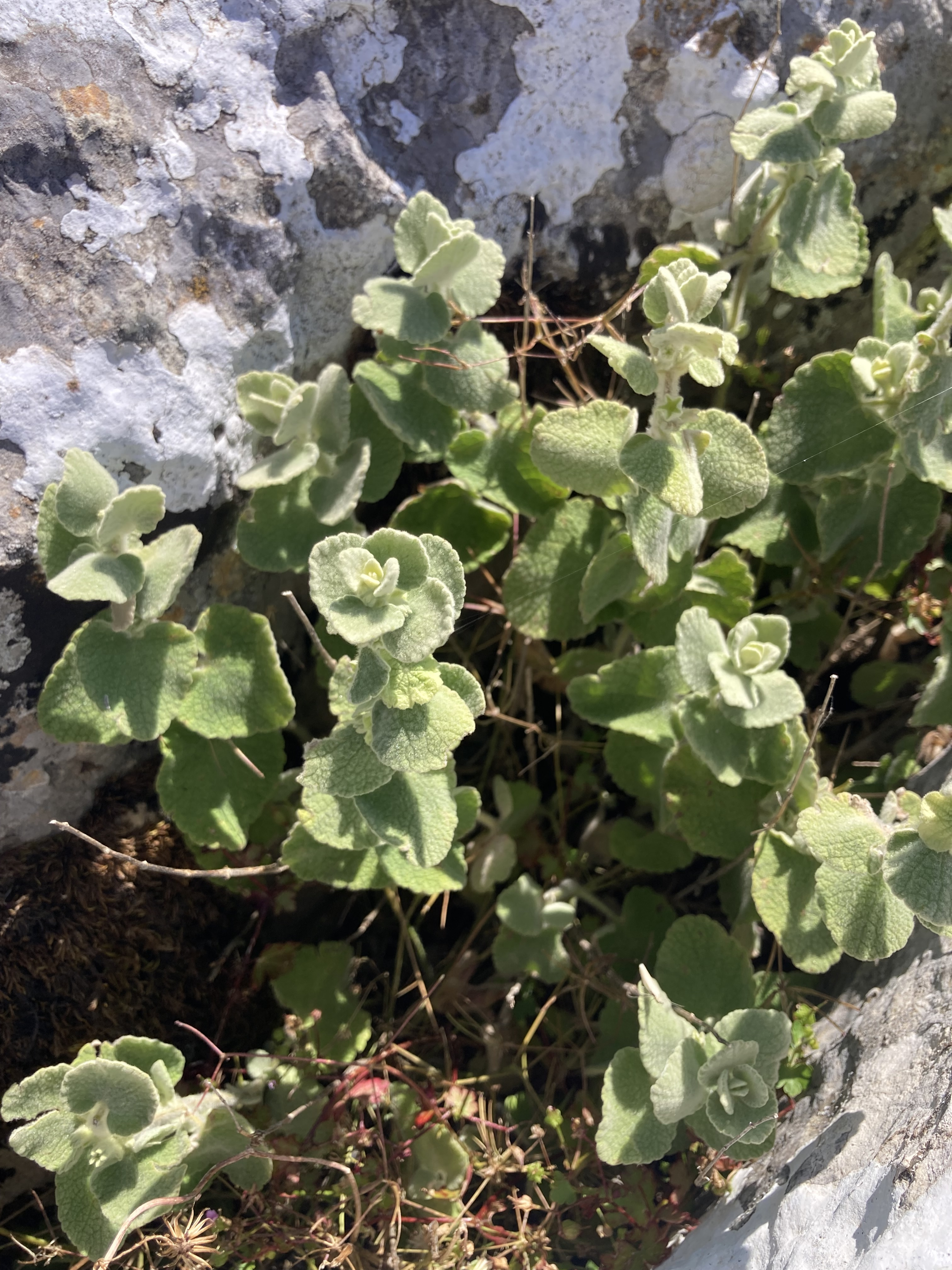
Detail of the leaves

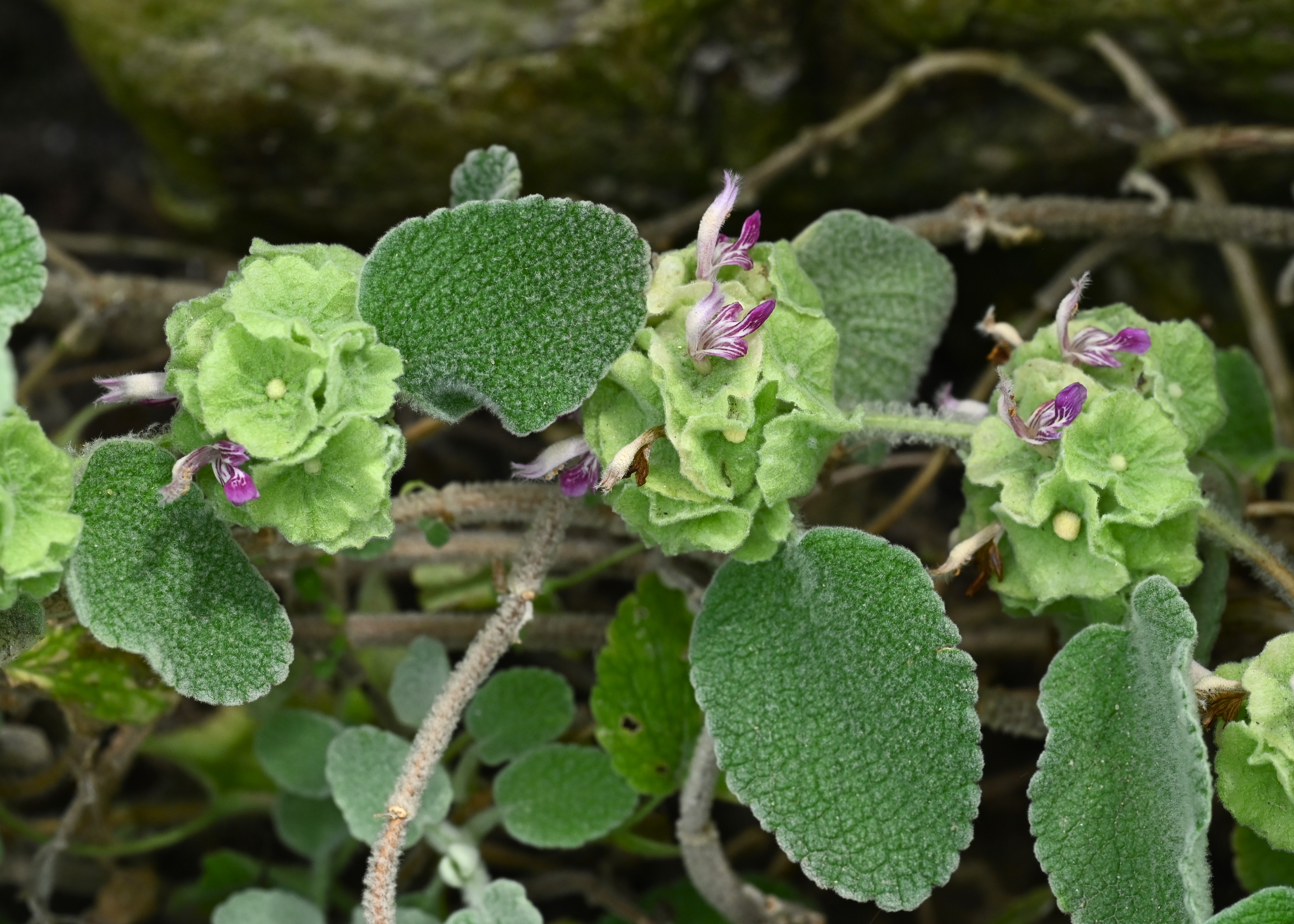
Detail of the flowers
