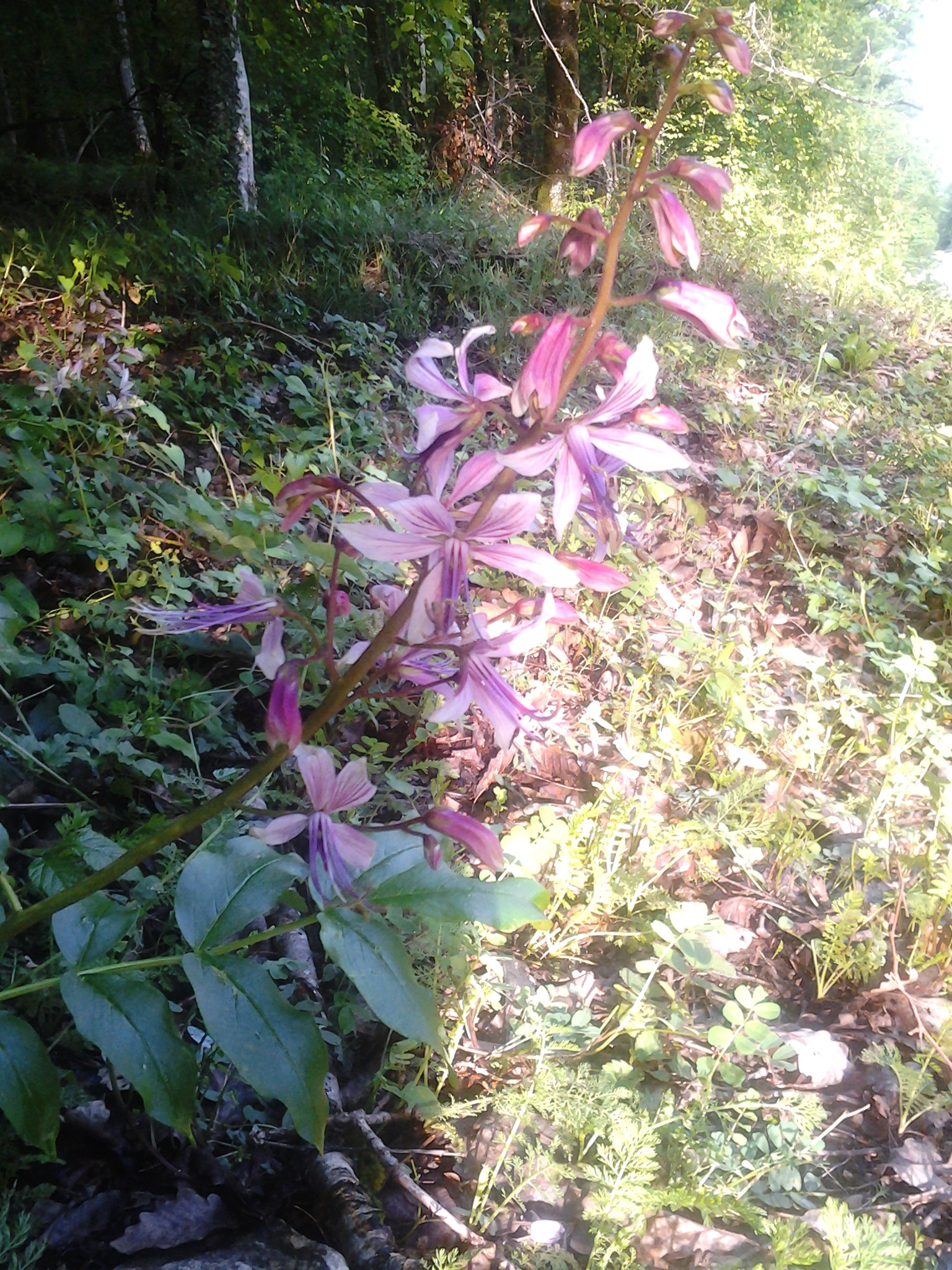
- In Sochi National Park

Scientific classification
- Kingdom: Plantae
- Clade: Embryophytes
- Clade: Tracheophytes
- Clade: Spermatophytes
- Clade: Angiosperms
- Clade: Eudicots
- Clade: Rosids
- Order: Sapindales
- Family: Rutaceae
- Genus: Dictamnus
- Species: D. caucasicus

Binomial name
- Dictamnus caucasicus (Fisch. & C.A.Mey.) Fisch. ex Grossh.)

Synonyms
- Dictamnus albus subsp. caucasicus; Dictamnus fraxinella var. caucasicus

= Dictamnus caucasicus =

Species of plant

Dictamnus caucasicus is a species of flowering plant in the family Rutaceae, native: Armenia; Azerbaijan (Nakhchivan); Georgia; Russia (North Caucasus). It was first described by Friedrich Ernst Ludwig von Fischer and Carl Anton von Meyer, and given the correct name by a Soviet botanist Alexander Alfonsovich Grossheim.
