= Dictamnus dasycarpus =

Scientific classification
- Kingdom: Plantae
- Clade: Tracheophytes
- Clade: Angiosperms
- Clade: Eudicots
- Clade: Rosids
- Order: Sapindales
- Family: Rutaceae
- Genus: Dictamnus
- Species: D. dasycarpus

Binomial name
- Dictamnus dasycarpus Turcz.

Synonyms
- Dictamnus albus var. dasycarpus (Turcz.) Liou & Y.H.Chang

Species of plant

Dictamnus dasycarpus or Chinese dittany is a species of flowering plant in the family Rutaceae, native from southeast Siberia to China and Korea. It was first described by Nikolai Turczaninow in 1842. It has also been treated as only a variety of Dictamnus albus.
