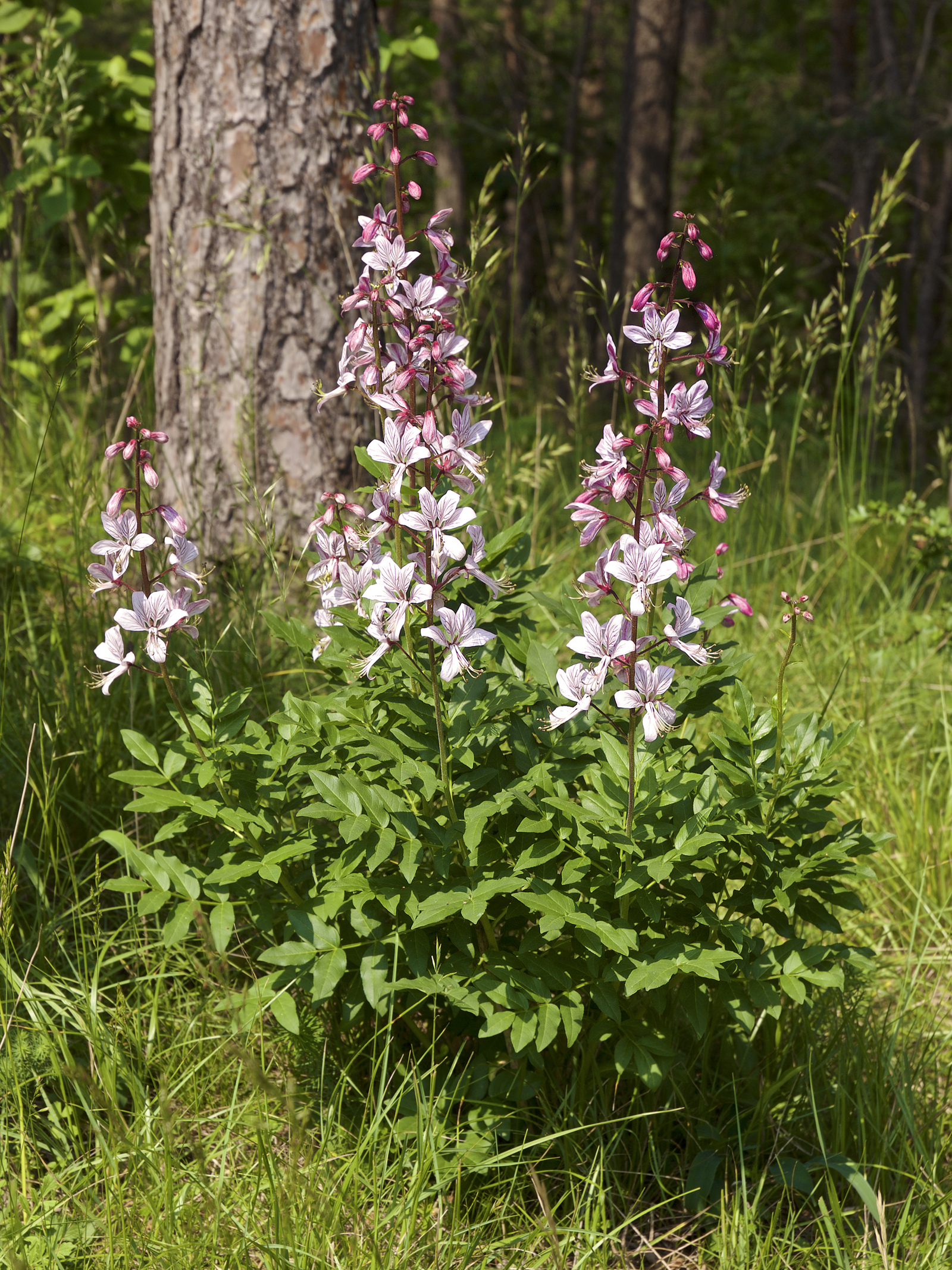

Scientific classification
- Kingdom: Plantae
- Clade: Embryophytes
- Clade: Tracheophytes
- Clade: Spermatophytes
- Clade: Angiosperms
- Clade: Eudicots
- Clade: Rosids
- Order: Sapindales
- Family: Rutaceae
- Genus: Dictamnus
- Species: D. albus

Binomial name
- Dictamnus albus L.

Synonyms
- Synonyms list: Dictamnus altaicus Fisch. ex Royle; Dictamnus angustifolius G.Don ex Sweet; Dictamnus caucasicus (Fisch. & C.A.Mey.) Fisch. ex Grossh.; Dictamnus dasycarpus f. velutinus (Nakai) W.Lee; Dictamnus fraxinella Link; Dictamnus generalis E.H.L.Krause; Dictamnus gymnostylis Steven; Dictamnus himalayensis Royle; Dictamnus hispanicus Webb ex Willk.; Dictamnus macedonicus (Borbás) Pénzes; Dictamnus microphyllus Schur; Dictamnus obtusiflorus W.D.J.Koch; Dictamnus odorus Salisb.; Dictamnus sessilis Wallr.; Dictamnus solitarius Stokes; Dictamnus suffultus Wallr.; Dictamnus tadshikorum Vved.; Fraxinella alba (L.) Gaertn.; Fraxinella dictamnus Moench

= Dictamnus albus =

Species of flowering plant

Dictamnus albus is a species of flowering plant in the family Rutaceae. It is also known as burning bush, dittany, gas plant or fraxinella. This herbaceous perennial has several geographical variants. It is native to warm, open woodland habitats in southern Europe, north Africa and much of Asia.

== Description ==
This plant grows about 40 cm (16 in) to 100 cm (39 in) high. Its flowers form a loose pyramidal spike and vary in colour from pale purple to white. The flowers are five-petalled with long projecting stamens. The leaves resemble those of an ash tree.

== Cultivation ==
Several varieties and cultivars have been selected for garden use. The variety D. albus var. purpureus in which the violet-purple is confined to veining of white petals with a slight blush, has gained the Royal Horticultural Society's Award of Garden Merit. Dictamnus is tap-rooted, making mature plants difficult to establish and resistant to division; young plants often need three years before they begin to flower, and since it is late to break into leaf in spring, even quite mature clumps may be harmed with vigorous soil-working in spring. For all these reasons, added to toxicity of the foliage, Dictamnus is rarely seen in American gardens.

== Toxicity ==
The leaves have a bitter and unpalatable taste. Despite the lemon-like smell, the plant is acrid when eaten. All parts of the plant may cause mild stomach upset if eaten, and contact with the foliage may cause phytophotodermatitis.

== Volatile oils ==
The name "burning bush" derives from the volatile oils produced by the plant, which can catch fire readily in hot weather, leading to comparisons with the burning bush of the Bible, including the suggestion that this is the plant involved there. The daughter of Swedish botanist Carl Linnaeus is said to have ignited the air once, at the end of a particularly hot, windless summer day, above Dictamnus plants, using a simple matchstick. The volatile oils have a reputed component of isoprene.

== Chemistry ==
More than 100 chemical constituents have been isolated from the genus Dictamnus, including alkaloids, limonoid triterpenoids, flavonoids, sesquiterpenoids, coumarins, and Phenylpropanoids.

== Gallery ==
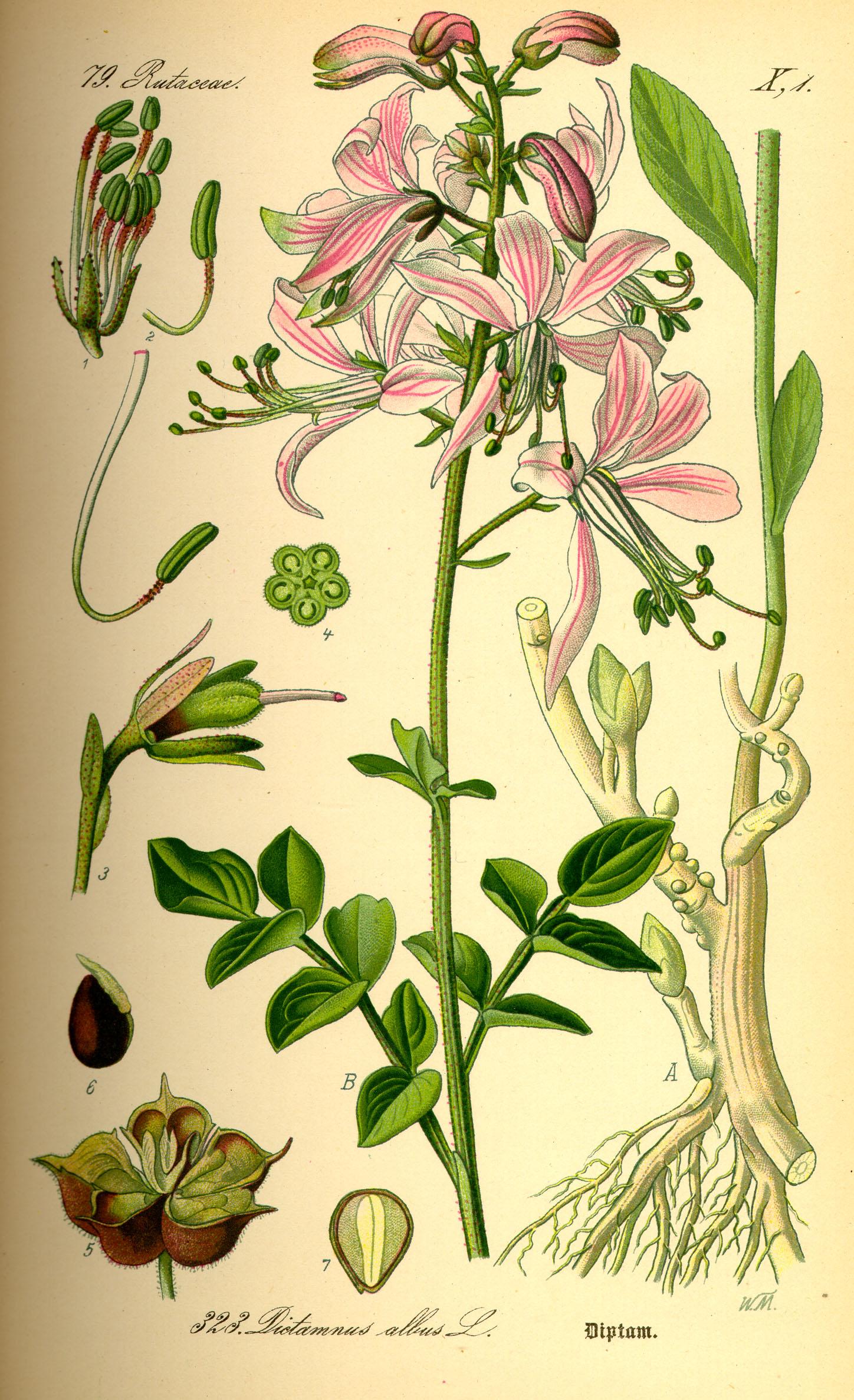
Illustration from Flora von Deutschland, Österreich und der Schweiz 1885

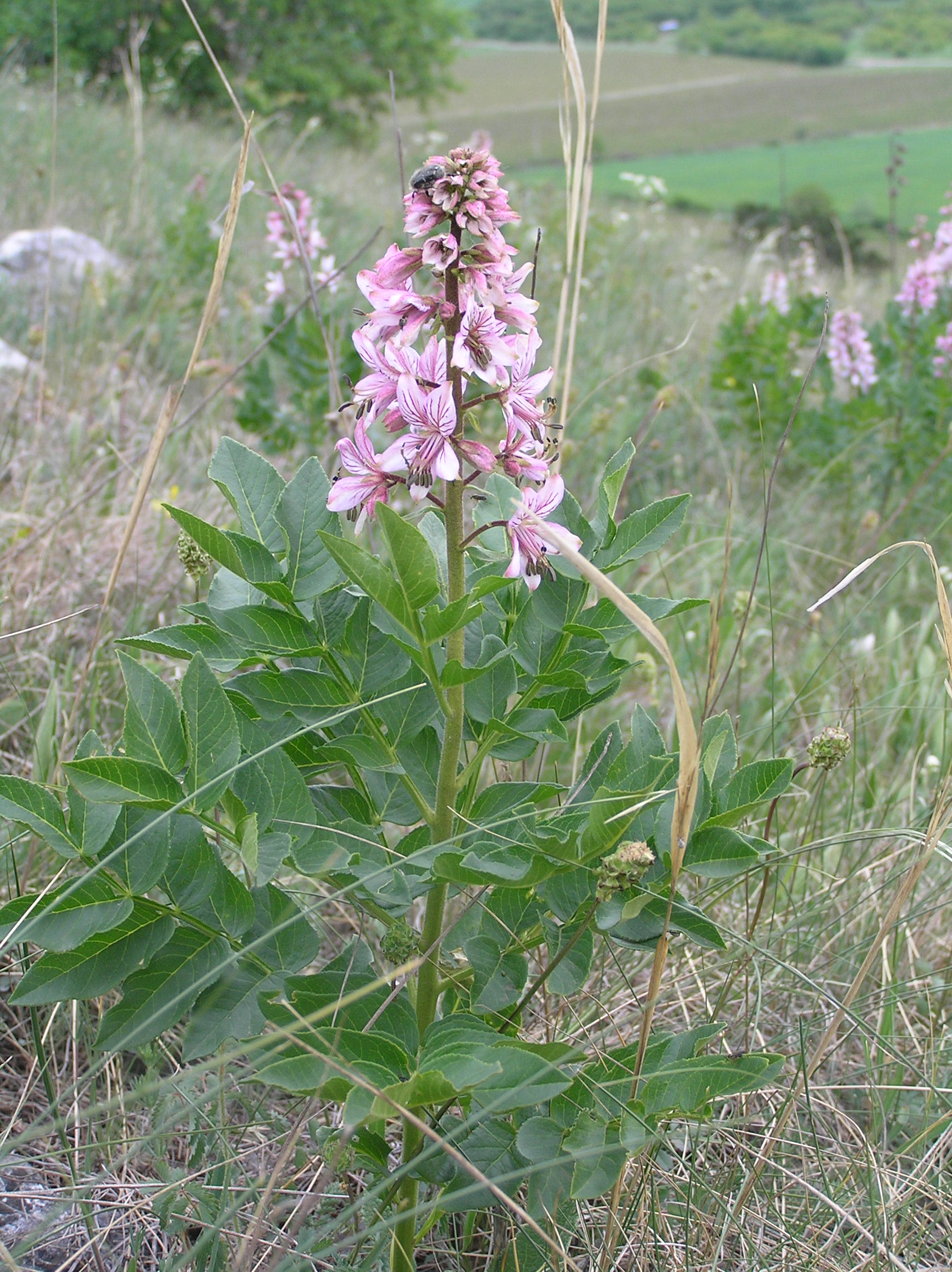

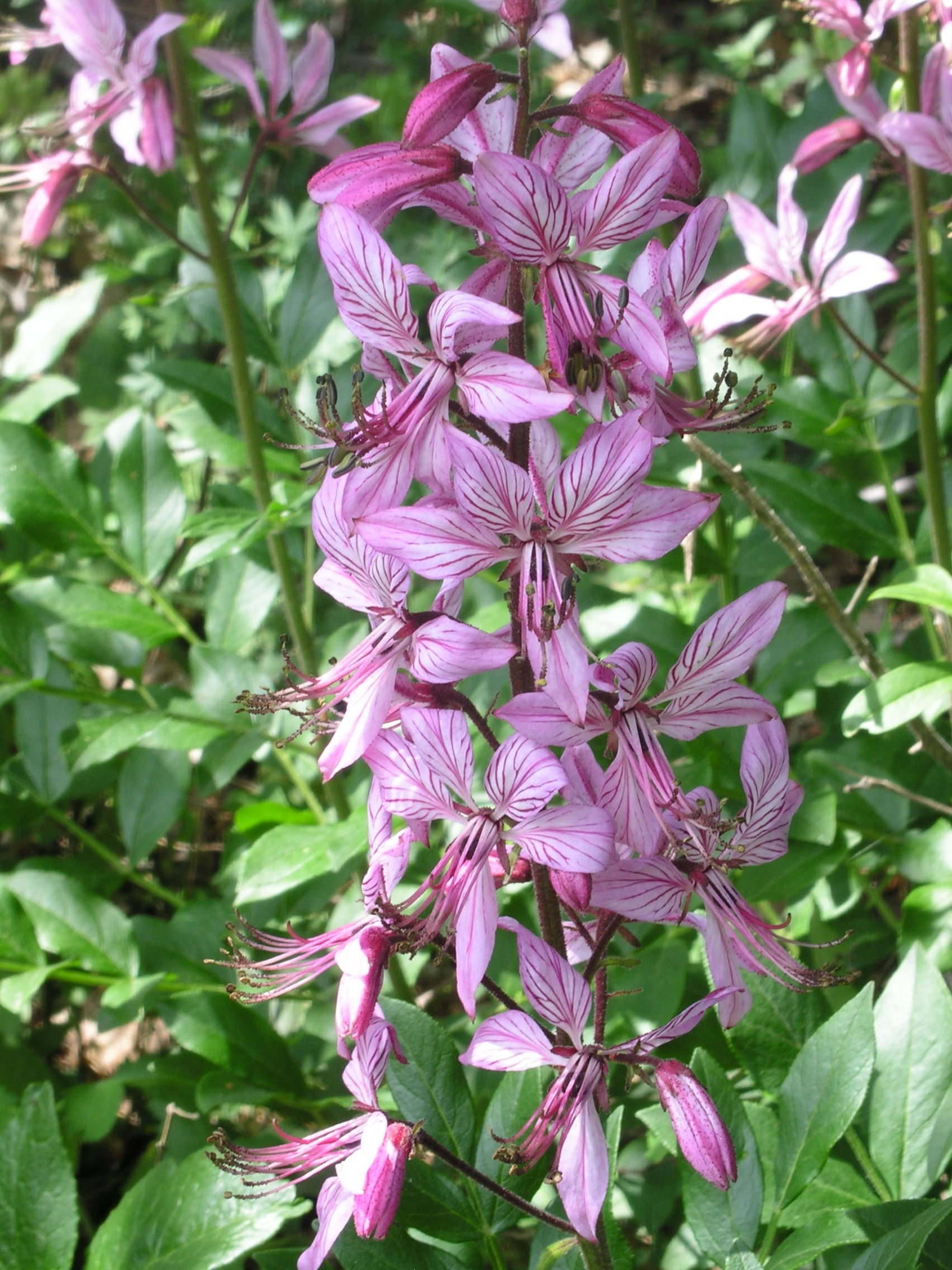

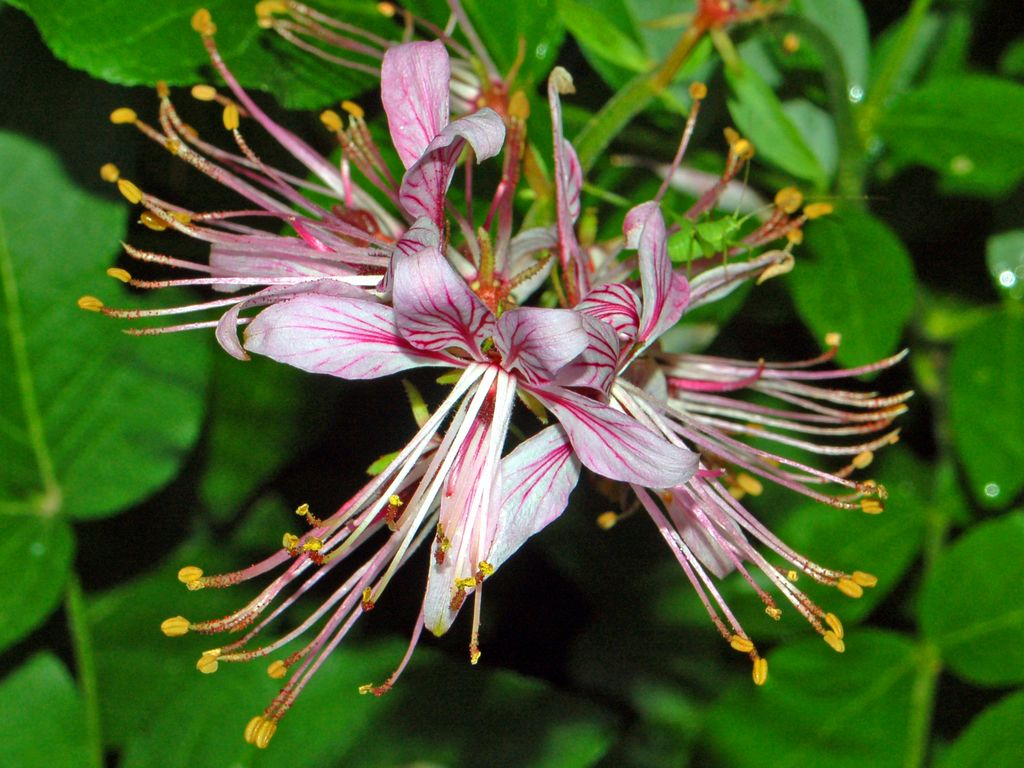

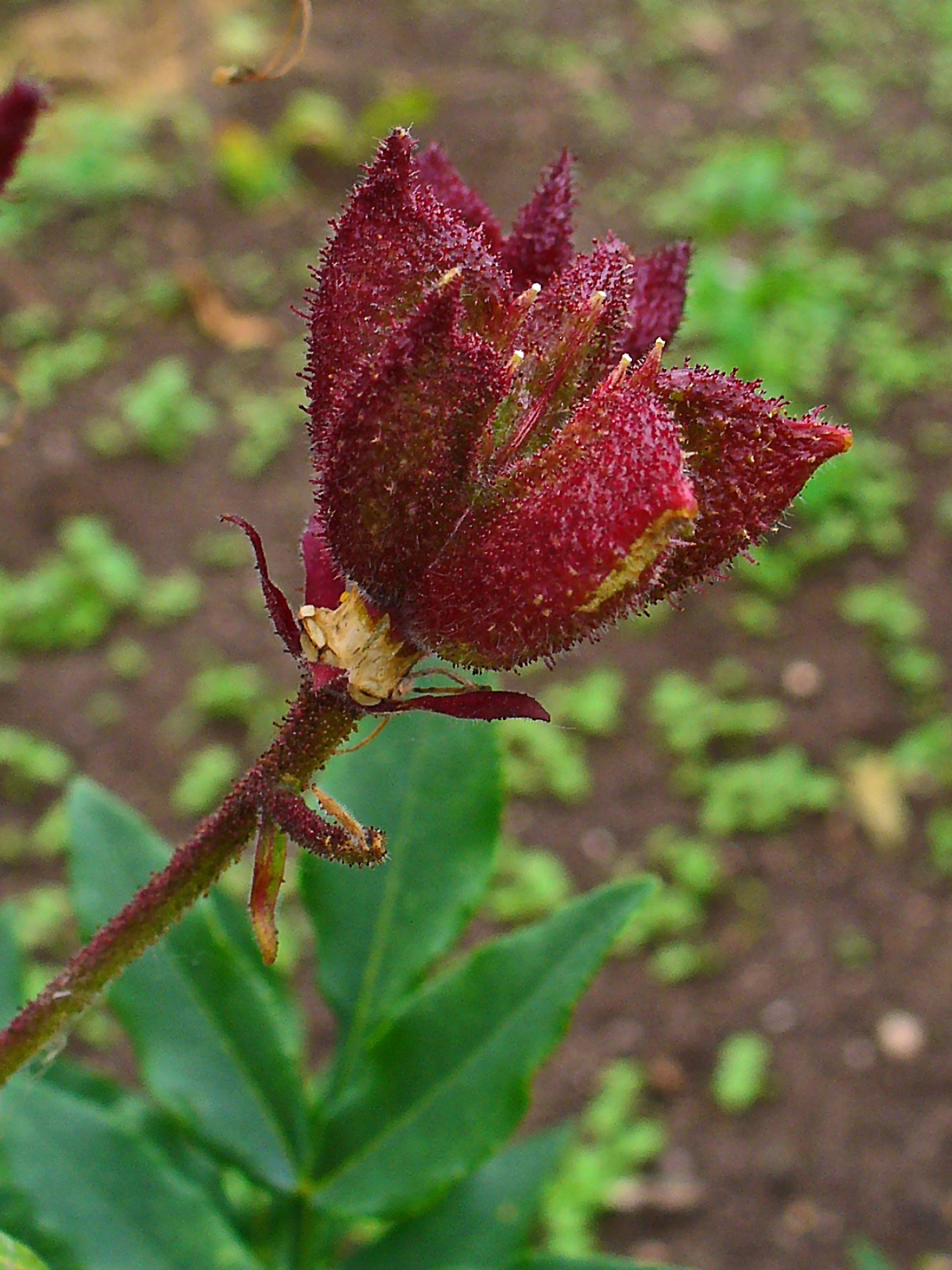
Fruit

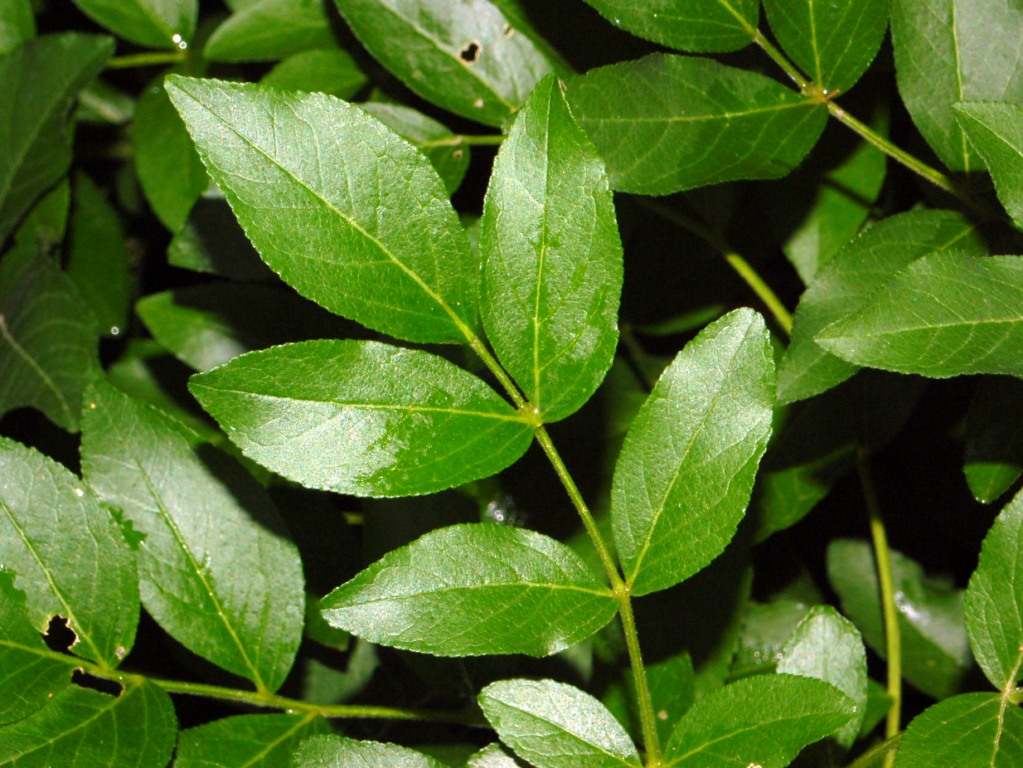
