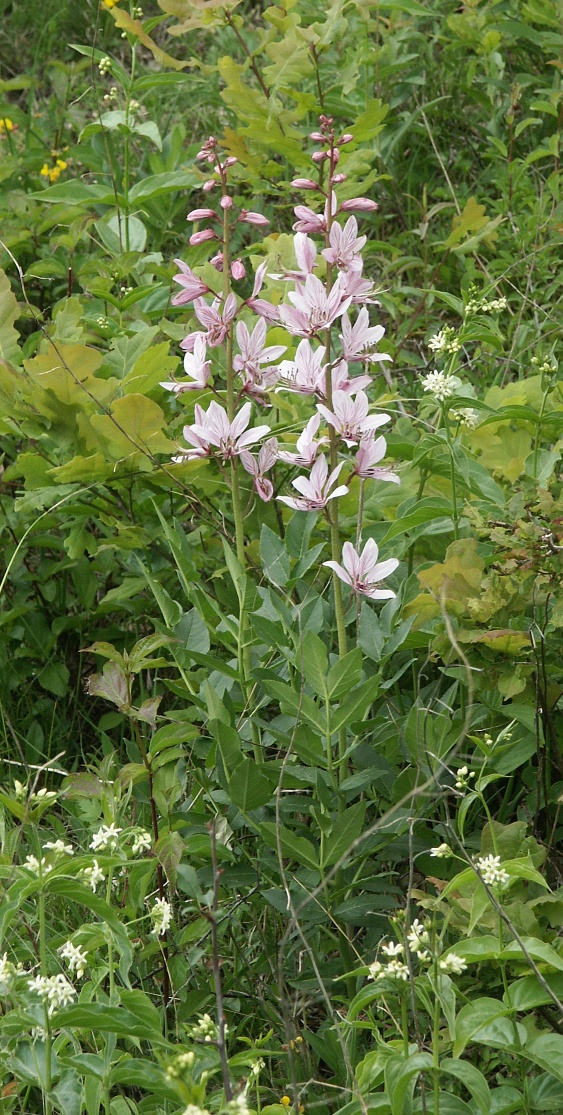
- Dictamnus albus

Scientific classification
- Kingdom: Plantae
- Clade: Tracheophytes
- Clade: Angiosperms
- Clade: Eudicots
- Clade: Rosids
- Order: Sapindales
- Family: Rutaceae
- Subfamily: Zanthoxyloideae
- Genus: Dictamnus; L.

Species
- See text

Synonyms
- Fraxinella Mill.

= Dictamnus =

Genus of plants

Dictamnus is a genus of flowering plant in the family Rutaceae, native to temperate Eurasia from Spain to China. The genus was first described by Carl Linnaeus in 1753.

== Species ==
As of May 2026, Plants of the World Online accepted three species:

- Dictamnus albus L.
- Dictamnus dasycarpus Turcz.
- Dictamnus hispanicus Webb ex Willk.

Dictamnus angustifolius G.Don ex Sweet and Dictamnus caucasicus Fisch. ex C. A. Mey. used to be treated as separate species, but today are considered varieties of Dictamnus albus, not as distinct species.
