= List of Coleophora species =

This is a list of all Coleophora species. Coleophora is a very large genus of moths of the family Coleophoridae. It contains some 1,350 described species. The genus is represented on all continents, but the majority are found in the Nearctic and Palaearctic regions. Many authors have tried splitting the genus into numerous smaller ones, but most of these have not become widely accepted.

== List of species ==
Species placed (at least provisionally) in Coleophora include: A B C D E F G H I J K L M N O P Q R S T U V U W X Y Z

=== A ===
- C. abbasella
- C. absinthii
- C. absinthivora
- C. acamtopappi
- C. acanthabortiva
- C. acanthophylli
- C. acanthyllidis
- C. accadica
- C. accola
- C. accordella
- C. acerosa
- C. achaenivora
- C. achilleae
- C. acmura
- C. acompha
- C. acrisella
- C. aculeata
- C. acuminatoides
- C. acutipennella
- C. acutiphaga
- C. adalligata
- C. adelogrammella
- C. adelpha
- C. adilella
- C. adjectella
- C. adjunctella
- C. adlecta
- C. adrianae
- C. adspersella
- C. adumbratella
- C. aegra
- C. aegyptiacae
- C. aelleniae
- C. aeneostrigella
- C. aenusella
- C. aequalella
- C. aequigesa
- C. aervae
- C. aestuariella
- C. aethiops
- C. affiliatella
- C. afghana
- C. afrohispana
- C. afrosarda
- C. afrotropicalis
- C. agadirensis
- C. agasta
- C. agathella
- C. agenjoi
- C. agilis
- C. aglabitella
- C. agnatella
- C. agnosa
- C. agrianella
- C. agridensis
- C. ahenella
- C. alabama
- C. alabardata
- C. alashiae
- C. albacostella
- C. albadomina
- C. albarracinica
- C. albella
- C. albens
- C. albicans
- C. albicella
- C. albicilia
- C. albicinctella
- C. albicosta
- C. albicostella
- C. albidella
- C. albidorsella
- C. albilineella
- C. albiochrella
- C. albipennella
- C. albiradiata
- C. albitarsella
- C. albostraminata
- C. albotitae
- C. albovanescens
- C. albulae
- C. alcyonipennella
- C. alecturella
- C. aleramica
- C. alfacarensis
- C. algeriensis
- C. algidella
- C. alhamaella
- C. aliena
- C. aliquanta
- C. almeriensis
- C. alniella
- C. alnifoliae
- C. alphitonella
- C. altaicolella
- C. alticolella
- C. alticorollina
- C. altivagella
- C. amarchana
- C. amasicola
- C. amasiella
- C. amellivora
- C. amentastra
- C. amethystinella
- C. amiculella
- C. amikanella
- C. ammodyta
- C. ammophora
- C. amphorella
- C. amseliella
- C. amygdalina
- C. anabaseos
- C. anatipennella
- C. ancistron
- C. anelpista
- C. anguliferella
- C. angustiorella
- C. angustipennis
- C. anisota
- C. anitella
- C. annulicola
- C. antennariella
- C. anthocalia
- C. aphanombra
- C. aphrocrossa
- C. apicialbella
- C. apicidentata
- C. aporiella
- C. apta
- C. apythana
- C. aquaecadentis
- C. arachnias
- C. arachosiae
- C. arctostaphyli
- C. ardesicola
- C. arefactella
- C. arenbergerella
- C. arenicola
- C. arenifera
- C. areniphila
- C. arens
- C. argentella
- C. argenteonivea
- C. argentialbella
- C. argentifimbriata
- C. argentinae
- C. argentula
- C. argopleura
- C. argyrella
- C. arizoniella
- C. arkaimella
- C. armeniae
- C. arta
- C. artemisicolella
- C. asiaeminoris
- C. asirensis
- C. asperginella
- C. assyriae
- C. astericola
- C. asteris
- C. asterophagella
- C. asterosella
- C. asthenella
- C. astragalella
- C. astragalorum
- C. atlanti
- C. atrilineella
- C. atriplicis
- C. atriplicivora
- C. atromarginata
- C. attalicella
- C. audeoudi
- C. aularia
- C. auricella
- C. austrina
- C. autumnella
- C. azishtella
- C. azyma

=== B ===
- C. bactrianae
- C. badiipennella
- C. bagorella
- C. baischi
- C. bajkalella
- C. balkara
- C. ballotella
- C. bandiamirella
- C. bantuella
- C. barbaricina
- C. basimaculella
- C. basistrigella
- C. bassii
- C. batangica
- C. bazae
- C. bedella
- C. beduina
- C. bella
- C. benestrigatella
- C. berbera
- C. berdjanski
- C. berlandella
- C. beticella
- C. betulella
- C. bidens
- C. bidentella
- C. biforis
- C. bifrondella
- C. bifurca
- C. bifurcella
- C. bihastulifera
- C. bilineatella
- C. bilineella
- C. biminimmaculella
- C. binderella
- C. binotapennella
- C. bipunctella
- C. biseriatella
- C. biskraensis
- C. bispinatella
- C. bistrigella
- C. bitlisella
- C. bivittella
- C. bogdoensis
- C. bojalyshi
- C. borea
- C. boreella
- C. bornicensis
- C. botaurella
- C. brandbergella
- C. brevipalpella
- C. breviuscula
- C. breyeri
- C. brunneipennis
- C. brunneosignata
- C. buettikeri
- C. bulganella
- C. burhinella
- C. burmanni
- C. buteella
- C. byrsostola

=== C ===
- C. cadella
- C. caelebipennella
- C. caespititiella
- C. caganella
- C. calandrella
- C. calida
- C. calligoni
- C. callipepla
- C. calycotomella
- C. campella
- C. campestriphaga
- C. canadensisella
- C. canariipennella
- C. capella
- C. capillata
- C. capitargentella
- C. cappadociae
- C. capricornis
- C. captiosa
- C. caradjai
- C. caraganae
- C. carchara
- C. carelica
- C. carmaniae
- C. caroxyli
- C. cartilaginella
- C. castalia
- C. caucasica
- C. cavillosa
- C. cecidophorella
- C. celsa
- C. centaureivora
- C. centralis
- C. centrota
- C. ceratoidis
- C. cercidiphyllella
- C. certhiella
- C. cervinella
- C. chalcogrammella
- C. chalepa
- C. chamaedriella
- C. chambersella
- C. changaica
- C. charadriella
- C. charistis
- C. chenopodii
- C. cherasforella
- C. chiclanensis
- C. chordoscelis
- C. chotticola
- C. chretieni
- C. chretieniella
- C. christenseni
- C. chrysanthemi
- C. chumanensis
- C. ciconiella
- C. ciliataephaga
- C. cinclella
- C. cinerea
- C. cirsiella
- C. cisoriella
- C. citrarga
- C. climacopterae
- C. clypeiferella
- C. cnossiaca
- C. coarctataephaga
- C. cochleata
- C. coenosipennella
- C. cogitata
- C. coliella
- C. colutella
- C. comata
- C. comperta
- C. comptoniella
- C. concolorella
- C. confluella
- C. confusa
- C. congeriella
- C. conspersa
- C. conspicuella
- C. consumpta
- C. contrariella
- C. conyzae
- C. coracipennella
- C. coriacea
- C. cormicola
- C. cornella
- C. cornivorella
- C. cornutella
- C. coronata
- C. coronillae
- C. corsicella
- C. corticosa
- C. corylifoliella
- C. cousiniae
- C. coxi
- C. cracella
- C. crassa
- C. crassicornella
- C. cratipennella
- C. creola
- C. crepidinella
- C. cretaticostella
- C. crexella
- C. crinita
- C. crispella
- C. cristata
- C. crossanthes
- C. crypsineura
- C. crypsiphanes
- C. cteis
- C. cuprariella
- C. cuprea
- C. currucipennella
- C. curta
- C. curvidentatella
- C. curvirostra
- C. cycnea
- C. cyrniella
- C. cyrta
- C. cythisanthi
- C. cytisivora

=== D ===
- C. daeva
- C. daglarica
- C. damarella
- C. dangchuanica
- C. darica
- C. darigangae
- C. darwini
- C. deauratella
- C. debilella
- C. decipiens
- C. decoratella
- C. delgerella
- C. delicatella
- C. delmastroella
- C. demaculella
- C. demissella
- C. dendroidis
- C. denigrella
- C. dentatella
- C. denticulata
- C. dentiferella
- C. dentiferoides
- C. depunctella
- C. derasofasciella
- C. derbendella
- C. derrai
- C. desultrix
- C. detractella
- C. deviella
- C. dextrella
- C. dianthi
- C. dianthivora
- C. didymella
- C. diffusa
- C. dignella
- C. dilabens
- C. diluta
- C. diogenes
- C. dipalliata
- C. diplodon
- C. directella
- C. discifera
- C. discomaculella
- C. discopunctata
- C. discordella
- C. discostriata
- C. dissecta
- C. dissociella
- C. dissona
- C. ditella
- C. dividua
- C. dorita
- C. dormiens
- C. dorsiproducta
- C. dracontea
- C. drangianae
- C. drymidis
- C. drymophila
- C. dubiella
- C. duplicis

=== E ===
- C. echinacea
- C. echinopsilonella
- C. echyropis
- C. efflua
- C. eichleri
- C. eilatica
- C. elaeagnisella
- C. elamita
- C. elbursella
- C. elegans
- C. elephantacolorella
- C. elephantella
- C. elodella
- C. eltonica
- C. emberizella
- C. enchitis
- C. enkomiella
- C. entoloma
- C. epijudaica
- C. eremodes
- C. eremosparti
- C. ericoides
- C. erratella
- C. esignata
- C. estriatella
- C. eteropennella
- C. etrusca
- C. eucalla
- C. eucasia
- C. eucoleos
- C. eumorphella
- C. eupepla
- C. eupreta
- C. eurasiatica
- C. euryaula
- C. exalbida
- C. exarga
- C. exlentii
- C. explorata
- C. expressella
- C. exul

=== F ===
- C. facilis
- C. fagicorticella
- C. falcigerella
- C. falcipenella
- C. falkovitshella
- C. famella
- C. felixella
- C. femorella
- C. fengxianica
- C. feoleuca
- C. feomicrella
- C. fergana
- C. ferruginea
- C. festivella
- C. filaginella
- C. fiorii
- C. flabelligerella
- C. flammea
- C. flavicornis
- C. flavicosta
- C. flaviella
- C. flavipennella
- C. flavovena
- C. follicularis
- C. fragilella
- C. frankii
- C. fraternella
- C. fretella
- C. fringillella
- C. frischella
- C. frivolella
- C. frustrata
- C. fulgidella
- C. fuliginosa
- C. fulvociliella
- C. fuscicornis
- C. fuscinervella
- C. fuscoaenea
- C. fuscociliella
- C. fuscocuprella
- C. fuscolineata
- C. fuscopictella
- C. fuscosquamata
- C. fuscostrigella

=== G ===
- C. gabralensis
- C. galatellae
- C. galbulipennella
- C. galligena
- C. gallipennella
- C. gallivora
- C. gallurella
- C. ganglionella
- C. gardesanella
- C. gaviaepennella
- C. gaylussaciella
- C. gazella
- C. gedrosiae
- C. geghardella
- C. gemmiformis
- C. genistae
- C. genuina
- C. genviki
- C. gerasimovi
- C. ghorella
- C. gibberosa
- C. gielisi
- C. glareolella
- C. glaseri
- C. glaucella
- C. glaucicolella
- C. glissandella
- C. glitzella
- C. glycyrrhizae
- C. glymma
- C. gnaphalii
- C. gobincola
- C. goluensis
- C. gongliuensis
- C. gossypinae
- C. gracilella
- C. graeca
- C. graminicolella
- C. granifera
- C. granulatella
- C. granulosella
- C. gredosella
- C. griseomixta
- C. gryphipennella
- C. guadicensis
- C. gulinovi
- C. gurunensis
- C. guttella
- C. guttiferella
- C. gymnocarpella
- C. gypsella

=== H ===
- C. hackmani
- C. hadrocerella
- C. halimodendri
- C. halmodes
- C. halocnemi
- C. halophilella
- C. halostachydis
- C. halothamni
- C. haloxyli
- C. haloxylonella
- C. hamata
- C. hancola
- C. haoma
- C. harbinensis
- C. hartigi
- C. hatamae
- C. haywardi
- C. heihensis
- C. heinrichella
- C. helgada
- C. helianthemella
- C. helichrysiella
- C. helvolella
- C. hemerobiella
- C. hemerobiola
- C. heringi
- C. hermanniella
- C. hernia
- C. hiberica
- C. hieratica
- C. hieronella
- C. himyarita
- C. hinnula
- C. hippodromica
- C. hipponae
- C. hirsutella
- C. hoeneella
- C. hololeucella
- C. honestella
- C. hongorella
- C. honshuella
- C. horakae
- C. horatioella
- C. horridula
- C. hospitiella
- C. hsiaolingensis
- C. hungariae
- C. hydrella
- C. hydrolapathella
- C. hymenocrateri
- C. hypomona
- C. hypoxantha
- C. hyssopi
- C. hystricella

=== I ===
- C. ibipennella
- C. ichthyura
- C. idaeella
- C. ignobilis
- C. ignotella
- C. iljiniae
- C. illustrata
- C. imbecilla
- C. immersa
- C. impalella
- C. impercepta
- C. impexa
- C. implicitella
- C. impunctata
- C. inclita
- C. inconstans
- C. incultella
- C. indefinitella
- C. inequidentella
- C. inermis
- C. infolliculella
- C. infuscatella
- C. innermongoliensis
- C. inopinata
- C. insulicola
- C. intensa
- C. intercalaris
- C. intermediella
- C. intermixta
- C. internitens
- C. intexta
- C. inulae
- C. inusitatella
- C. inversella
- C. involucrella
- C. iperspinata
- C. iranella
- C. irinae
- C. irinella
- C. irroratella
- C. isabellina
- C. islamella
- C. isodonta
- C. isomoera
- C. ispartae
- C. issikii
- C. ivrizensis
- C. izenella

=== J ===
- C. jaculatoria
- C. jaernaensis
- C. japonicella
- C. jebeli
- C. jefreniensis
- C. jerusalemella
- C. judaica
- C. juglandella
- C. juncicolella
- C. juncivora
- C. jynxella

=== K ===
- C. kabulensis
- C. kahaourella
- C. kaiynella
- C. kalidii
- C. kalmiella
- C. kamchatica
- C. kamiesella
- C. kandevanella
- C. kandymella
- C. kantarica
- C. karakurti
- C. kargani
- C. karsholti
- C. kashkaella
- C. kaszabi
- C. katangica
- C. katunella
- C. kautzi
- C. kearfottella
- C. keireuki
- C. kenyaensis
- C. kitella
- C. kizildashi
- C. klimeschiella
- C. kolymella
- C. kondarensis
- C. kononenkoi
- C. korbi
- C. koreana
- C. koshmella
- C. kosteri
- C. kotalensis
- C. kroneella
- C. kruegeri
- C. kudrosella
- C. kuehnella
- C. kunenensis
- C. kurokoi
- C. kuznetzovi
- C. kyffhusana

=== L ===
- C. lacera
- C. laconiae
- C. ladonia
- C. laevipennis
- C. lagopella
- C. laniella
- C. laricella
- C. lasiocharis
- C. lasloella
- C. lassella
- C. laticornella
- C. lativalva
- C. lativittella
- C. latronella
- C. laurentella
- C. lebedella
- C. ledi
- C. legitima
- C. lenae
- C. lentella
- C. lentiginosa
- C. leonensis
- C. lepyropis
- C. lessinica
- C. leucaula
- C. leucobela
- C. leucocephala
- C. leucochares
- C. leucochrysella
- C. leucopodella
- C. leucostoma
- C. levantis
- C. lewandowskii
- C. libanella
- C. libyca
- C. lima
- C. limacella
- C. limosipennella
- C. lineapulvella
- C. lineata
- C. lineolea
- C. linoplecta
- C. linosyridella
- C. linosyris
- C. liriophorella
- C. lithargyrinella
- C. littorella
- C. lixella
- C. lonchodes
- C. longicornella
- C. longicornuta
- C. longiductella
- C. longipalpella
- C. longispina
- C. loti
- C. loxodon
- C. lucida
- C. luciennella
- C. lunensis
- C. lurida
- C. lusciniaepennella
- C. lusitanica
- C. lutatiella
- C. luteochrella
- C. luteocostella
- C. luteolella
- C. lutipennella
- C. lycaoniae
- C. lycii
- C. lynosyridella

=== M ===
- C. macedonica
- C. machinopis
- C. macilenta
- C. macrobiella
- C. macrura
- C. maculipennella
- C. maghrebina
- C. magnatella
- C. magyarica
- C. majuscula
- C. makuensis
- C. malatiella
- C. manifesta
- C. manitoba
- C. marcarolensis
- C. marcella
- C. margarita
- C. maritella
- C. maritimarum
- C. maritimella
- C. markisaakovitshi
- C. maroccana
- C. maturella
- C. mausoleae
- C. mausolella
- C. mayrella
- C. mcdunnoughiella
- C. medelichensis
- C. mediae
- C. mediocris
- C. mediodens
- C. mediterranea
- C. megaloptila
- C. melanograpta
- C. mendica
- C. menephilella
- C. meridionella
- C. mexicana
- C. meyi
- C. microalbella
- C. microdon
- C. micromeriae
- C. micronotella
- C. microspinella
- C. microsticta
- C. microtitae
- C. microxantha
- C. millefolii
- C. milvipennis
- C. minaxella
- C. minimella
- C. minipalpella
- C. minipunctella
- C. minoica
- C. minutula
- C. mirabibella
- C. moehringiae
- C. molesta
- C. molothrella
- C. monardae
- C. monardella
- C. monoceros
- C. monstruosa
- C. montana
- C. monteiroi
- C. monticola
- C. moronella
- C. morosa
- C. mosasaurus
- C. motacillella
- C. mucronata
- C. multicristatella
- C. multipulvella
- C. murciana
- C. murinella
- C. musculella

=== N ===
- C. nairica
- C. namakella
- C. namangana
- C. namaqua
- C. namella
- C. namibiae
- C. nanophyti
- C. napolovi
- C. narbonensis
- C. necessaria
- C. neglecta
- C. neli
- C. nemorella
- C. neobagorella
- C. neolycii
- C. nepetae
- C. nepetellae
- C. nesiotidella
- C. nevadella
- C. neviusiella
- C. nielseni
- C. nigridorsella
- C. nigrosparsella
- C. nigrostriata
- C. nikiella
- C. ningxiana
- C. niphocrossa
- C. niphomesta
- C. nitidipennella
- C. niveiciliella
- C. niveicostella
- C. niveistrigella
- C. niveopictella
- C. noaeae
- C. nomgona
- C. novisqualorella
- C. nubivagella
- C. numeniella
- C. nurmahal
- C. nutantella
- C. nyingchiensis

=== O ===
- C. obducta
- C. obscenella
- C. obscuripalpella
- C. obtectella
- C. obviella
- C. occasi
- C. occatella
- C. occitana
- C. ochrea
- C. ochripennella
- C. ochroflava
- C. ochroptera
- C. ochrostriata
- C. octagonella
- C. odorariella
- C. ofaistoni
- C. ogmotona
- C. okuella
- C. oligostropha
- C. olympica
- C. omanica
- C. onobrychiella
- C. ononidella
- C. onopordiella
- C. opulens
- C. orbata
- C. orbitella
- C. ordinaria
- C. orenburgella
- C. orientalis
- C. oriolella
- C. ornatipennella
- C. orogella
- C. orotavensis
- C. orphnoceros
- C. ortneri
- C. ortrina
- C. ossaedeaga
- C. ostryae
- C. otidipennella
- C. ovata
- C. oxyphaea

=== P ===
- C. pachyderma
- C. paeltsaella
- C. pagodella
- C. pakistana
- C. palifera
- C. pallidata
- C. pallidiptera
- C. paludoides
- C. pandionella
- C. pannosa
- C. paphlagoniae
- C. pappiferella
- C. paracousiniae
- C. paradoxella
- C. paradrymidis
- C. paragallivora
- C. paragiraudi
- C. paramayrella
- C. paraononidella
- C. parapredotella
- C. paraptarmica
- C. parasymi
- C. paravestalella
- C. parcella
- C. parenthella
- C. parilis
- C. paripennella
- C. parki
- C. parthenica
- C. parthenogenella
- C. parthica
- C. partitella
- C. parvella
- C. parvicuprella
- C. passeripennella
- C. pastranai
- C. pathana
- C. patzaki
- C. pauperculella
- C. pechi
- C. peisoniella
- C. pelinopis
- C. pellicornella
- C. pendulivalvula
- C. pennella
- C. percnoceros
- C. peri
- C. peribenanderi
- C. perissa
- C. perplexella
- C. persana
- C. persimplexella
- C. peterseni
- C. petraea
- C. phaeocentra
- C. phlomidella
- C. phlomidis
- C. phoenicia
- C. phrygiae
- C. physophorae
- C. picardella
- C. pilion
- C. pinii
- C. pinkeri
- C. platyphyllae
- C. plicipunctella
- C. plumbella
- C. plurifoliella
- C. plurispinella
- C. poecilella
- C. pokrovkella
- C. polemoniella
- C. poliacantha
- C. polichomriensis
- C. polonicella
- C. polycarpaeae
- C. polynella
- C. pontica
- C. portulacae
- C. potentillae
- C. praecipua
- C. praeclara
- C. praecursella
- C. pratella
- C. preisseckeri
- C. prepostera
- C. presbytica
- C. principiella
- C. propinqua
- C. propinquoides
- C. protecta
- C. pruniella
- C. prunifoliae
- C. psamata
- C. psammodes
- C. pseudociconiella
- C. pseudodianthi
- C. pseudodirectella
- C. pseudoditella
- C. pseudofuscoaenea
- C. pseudolinosyris
- C. pseudopoecilella
- C. pseudorepentis
- C. pseudosquamosella
- C. psilopterella
- C. psychropa
- C. ptarmicia
- C. pterosparti
- C. puberuloides
- C. pulchricornis
- C. pulmonariella
- C. punctulatella
- C. purifica
- C. pustulosa
- C. pyrenaica
- C. pyrrhulipennella

=== Q ===
- C. quadrifariella
- C. quadrifurca
- C. quadrilineella
- C. quadristraminella
- C. quadristrigella
- C. quadruplex
- C. quercicola
- C. querciella
- C. qulikushella

=== R ===
- C. ramitella
- C. ramosella
- C. raphidon
- C. raptans
- C. ravillella
- C. rebeli
- C. rectilineella
- C. rectimarginalis
- C. recula
- C. remizella
- C. remotella
- C. repentis
- C. resupina
- C. retifera
- C. retrodentella
- C. rhanteriella
- C. rhinoceros
- C. ribasella
- C. riffelensis
- C. romieuxi
- C. roridella
- C. rosacella
- C. rosaefoliella
- C. rosaevorella
- C. rostrata
- C. rudella
- C. rugosae
- C. rupestrella
- C. rustica

=== S ===
- C. sabaea
- C. sacramenta
- C. safadella
- C. sahariana
- C. salicivorella
- C. salicorniae
- C. salinella
- C. salinoidella
- C. salsolella
- C. saltae
- C. salviella
- C. samarensis
- C. sanella
- C. santolinella
- C. saponariella
- C. saratovi
- C. sardiniae
- C. sardocorsa
- C. sarehma
- C. satellitella
- C. sattleri
- C. saturatella
- C. saudita
- C. saxauli
- C. saxicolella
- C. scabrida
- C. scaleuta
- C. scariphota
- C. schahkuhensis
- C. schauffeleella
- C. schibendyella
- C. schmidti
- C. scioleuca
- C. seguiella
- C. semicinerea
- C. seminalis
- C. seminella
- C. semistrigata
- C. sequens
- C. sergiella
- C. serinipennella
- C. seriphidii
- C. serpylletorum
- C. serratella
- C. serratulella
- C. settarii
- C. sexdentatella
- C. sibirica
- C. sibiricella
- C. siccifolia
- C. silenella
- C. simplex
- C. simulans
- C. sinensis
- C. singreni
- C. sisteronica
- C. sittella
- C. skanesella
- C. sobria
- C. sobrinella
- C. sodae
- C. soffneriella
- C. sogdianae
- C. solenella
- C. solidaginella
- C. solitariella
- C. soriaella
- C. spargospinella
- C. sparsiatomella
- C. sparsipulvella
- C. sparsipuncta
- C. spartana
- C. spinella
- C. spiraeella
- C. spiralis
- C. spumosella
- C. squalorella
- C. squamella
- C. squamosella
- C. stachi
- C. stachydis
- C. staehelinella
- C. statherota
- C. stegosaurus
- C. stenidella
- C. stepposa
- C. sternipennella
- C. stramentella
- C. straminella
- C. striatipennella
- C. strigiferella
- C. strigosella
- C. striolatella
- C. strophingella
- C. struella
- C. strutiella
- C. stuposa
- C. stylosa
- C. suaedae
- C. suaedicola
- C. subapicis
- C. subgilva
- C. sublata
- C. sublineariella
- C. subnivea
- C. subparcella
- C. subsolana
- C. subtremula
- C. subula
- C. succursella
- C. sudanella
- C. summivola
- C. sumptuosa
- C. superlonga
- C. supinella
- C. surniella
- C. svenssoni
- C. swatensis
- C. sylvaticella
- C. symmicta
- C. symphistropha
- C. synchrocera
- C. synchrona
- C. syriaca

=== T ===
- C. tabelli
- C. tacera
- C. tadzhikiella
- C. taeniipennella
- C. taizensis
- C. talynella
- C. tamara
- C. tamesis
- C. tanaceti
- C. tanitella
- C. tanyleuca
- C. taurica
- C. tauricella
- C. taygeti
- C. tecta
- C. teheranella
- C. telonica
- C. teneriffella
- C. tenuis
- C. terebrans
- C. teredo
- C. teregnathella
- C. terenaula
- C. tesquorum
- C. testudo
- C. tetraciliata
- C. tetrazonella
- C. tetrodonta
- C. texanella
- C. textoria
- C. therinella
- C. thiophaea
- C. thulea
- C. thurneri
- C. thymi
- C. thymiphaga
- C. tibetana
- C. tiliaefoliella
- C. timarella
- C. tleu
- C. tolensis
- C. tollamseliella
- C. tolli
- C. tornata
- C. toxotis
- C. tractella
- C. tragacanthae
- C. traganella
- C. traugotti
- C. tremefacta
- C. tremula
- C. treskaensis
- C. trichopterella
- C. tricolor
- C. tridentifera
- C. trientella
- C. trifariella
- C. triflua
- C. trifolii
- C. trigeminella
- C. trilineella
- C. trimaculella
- C. tringella
- C. tripeniella
- C. triplicis
- C. tripolitana
- C. tristella
- C. tristraminata
- C. trivalvis
- C. trochilella
- C. tsherkesi
- C. tshiligella
- C. tshogoni
- C. tuberculata
- C. tundrosa
- C. tunisiae
- C. turbatella
- C. turca
- C. turkestanica
- C. turolella
- C. tuvensis
- C. tyrrhaenica
- C. tytri

=== U ===
- C. ucrainae
- C. ugabensis
- C. uliginosella
- C. ulmifoliella
- C. ulmivorella
- C. umbratica
- C. unicrenata
- C. uniformis
- C. unigenella
- C. uniphalli
- C. unipunctella
- C. univittella
- C. uralensis
- C. uxorella

=== V ===
- C. vacciniella
- C. vacciniivorella
- C. vagans
- C. valesianella
- C. vancouverensis
- C. vanderwolfi
- C. vansoni
- C. varensis
- C. variicornis
- C. varisequens
- C. varnella
- C. vegrandis
- C. velocella
- C. ventadelsolella
- C. verbljushkella
- C. vermiculatella
- C. vernoniaeella
- C. versurella
- C. vestalella
- C. vestianella
- C. vibicella
- C. vibicigerella
- C. viburniella
- C. vicinella
- C. viettella
- C. villosa
- C. violacea
- C. virgatella
- C. virgaureae
- C. viridicuprella
- C. viscidiflorella
- C. vitilis
- C. vitisella
- C. vivesella
- C. voluta
- C. vulnerariae
- C. vulpecula

=== W ===
- C. walsinghami
- C. weymarni
- C. willinki
- C. wiltshirei
- C. wockeella
- C. wolschrijni
- C. wyethiae

=== X ===
- C. xanthoargentea
- C. xanthochlora
- C. xanthoptera
- C. xinjiangensis
- C. xyridella

=== Y ===
- C. yemenita
- C. yomogiella
- C. yunnanica
- C. yuzhongensis

=== Z ===
- C. zagella
- C. zagrosella
- C. zapluta
- C. zelleriella
- C. zernyi
- C. zhusani
- C. zhusguni
- C. zophodella
- C. zukowskii
- C. zygodon
- C. zygotaenia
- C. zymotica

== Species of unknown status ==
- Coleophora defessella Herrich-Schäffer, 1855 This species was described from Germany.
- Coleophora leucogrammella Herrich-Schäffer, 1855. This species was described from the Alps. The identity remains questionable. It has been recorded feeding on the leaves of Inula conyza. The larvae live in a black, laterally compressed, bivalved case with a mouth angle of less than 45°. The larvae have been recorded from autumn to May of the following year.
- Coleophora leugrammella Herrich-Schäffer, 1855
- Coleophora montihospitella Bruand, 1851
- Coleophora poteriella Amsel & Hering 1931 (Nomen nudum)
- Coleophora semilineariella Bruand, 1859 (Nomen dubium)
- Coleophora thymiella Herrich-Schäffer, 1861 This species was described from Germany.

== Excluded species ==
These species have recently been excluded from the genus Coleophora. However, not all have been placed in another genus yet.

- Batrachedra aphypnota Meyrick 1917 (formerly Coleophora aphypnota)
- Coleophora crossophanes Meyrick, 1917
- Coleophora tarsocoma Meyrick, 1917
- Pammeces picticornis (Walsingham, 1897) (formerly Coleophora picticornis)
