= Coleophora explorata =

Scientific classification
- Kingdom: Animalia
- Phylum: Arthropoda
- Class: Insecta
- Order: Lepidoptera
- Family: Coleophoridae
- Genus: Coleophora
- Species: C. explorata

Binomial name
- Coleophora explorata Petshen, 1992

Species of insect

Coleophora explorata is a moth of the family Coleophoridae.

The larvae feed on Acanthophyllum species. They feed on the leaves of their host plant.
