= Coleophora charistis =

Scientific classification
- Kingdom: Animalia
- Phylum: Arthropoda
- Class: Insecta
- Order: Lepidoptera
- Family: Coleophoridae
- Genus: Coleophora
- Species: C. charistis

Binomial name
- Coleophora charistis Meyrick, 1928

Species of moth

Coleophora charistis is a moth of the family Coleophoridae that is endemic to Morocco.
