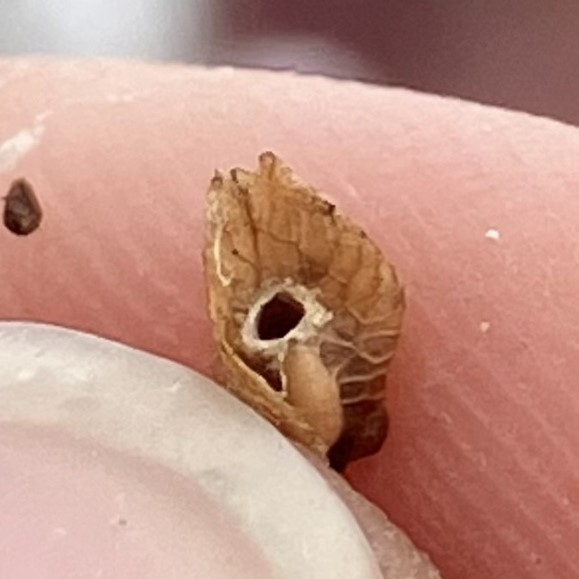
- Feeding damage

Scientific classification
- Kingdom: Animalia
- Phylum: Arthropoda
- Clade: Pancrustacea
- Class: Insecta
- Order: Lepidoptera
- Family: Coleophoridae
- Genus: Coleophora
- Species: C. benestrigatella

Binomial name
- Coleophora benestrigatella McDunnough, 1941

= Coleophora benestrigatella =

Species of moth

Coleophora benestrigatella is a species of moth in the family Coleophoridae. It is found in Canada and adjacent US states.
