= Coleophora stenidella =

Scientific classification
- Kingdom: Animalia
- Phylum: Arthropoda
- Class: Insecta
- Order: Lepidoptera
- Family: Coleophoridae
- Genus: Coleophora
- Species: C. stenidella

Binomial name
- Coleophora stenidella Toll, 1952

Species of moth

Coleophora stenidella is a moth of the family Coleophoridae that is endemic to Algeria.
