= Coleophora noaeae =

Scientific classification
- Kingdom: Animalia
- Phylum: Arthropoda
- Class: Insecta
- Order: Lepidoptera
- Family: Coleophoridae
- Genus: Coleophora
- Species: C. noaeae

Binomial name
- Coleophora noaeae (Falkovitsh, 1989)

Synonyms
- Casignetella noaeae Falkovitsh, 1989

Species of moth

Coleophora noaeae is a moth of the family Coleophoridae.

The larvae feed on Noaea mucronata. They feed on the leaves, flower buds and fruits of their host plant.
