= Coleophora leucopodella =

Scientific classification
- Kingdom: Animalia
- Phylum: Arthropoda
- Class: Insecta
- Order: Lepidoptera
- Family: Coleophoridae
- Genus: Coleophora
- Species: C. leucopodella

Binomial name
- Coleophora leucopodella Turati, 1930

Species of moth

Coleophora leucopodella is a moth of the family Coleophoridae. It is found in Libya.
