= Coleophora amygdalina =

Scientific classification
- Kingdom: Animalia
- Phylum: Arthropoda
- Class: Insecta
- Order: Lepidoptera
- Family: Coleophoridae
- Genus: Coleophora
- Species: C. amygdalina

Binomial name
- Coleophora amygdalina Falkovitsh, 1976

Species of moth

Coleophora amygdalina is a moth of the family Coleophoridae that is endemic to Tajikistan.
