= Coleophora tollamseliella =

Scientific classification
- Kingdom: Animalia
- Phylum: Arthropoda
- Class: Insecta
- Order: Lepidoptera
- Family: Coleophoridae
- Genus: Coleophora
- Species: C. tollamseliella

Binomial name
- Coleophora tollamseliella Oudejans, 1971

Species of moth

Coleophora tollamseliella is a moth of the family Coleophoridae. It is found in Afghanistan, Turkmenistan, Iran, Pakistan, and Turkey.
