= Coleophora castalia =

Scientific classification
- Kingdom: Animalia
- Phylum: Arthropoda
- Class: Insecta
- Order: Lepidoptera
- Family: Coleophoridae
- Genus: Coleophora
- Species: C. castalia

Binomial name
- Coleophora castalia Meyrick, 1930

Species of moth

Coleophora castalia is a moth of the family Coleophoridae. It is found in north-western Afghanistan, northern Pakistan, Kashmir and north-eastern India (Assam, Khasi-Jaintia Hills).

The wingspan is about 18 mm.
