= Coleophora hirsutella =

Scientific classification
- Kingdom: Animalia
- Phylum: Arthropoda
- Clade: Pancrustacea
- Class: Insecta
- Order: Lepidoptera
- Family: Coleophoridae
- Genus: Coleophora
- Species: C. hirsutella

Binomial name
- Coleophora hirsutella Baldizzone & van der Wolf, 2015

Species of moth

Coleophora hirsutella is a species of moth in the family Coleophoridae. It is found in Namibia.

The species belongs to the genus Coleophora, a large group of case-bearing moths within the family Coleophoridae.
