= Coleophora saxauli =

Scientific classification
- Kingdom: Animalia
- Phylum: Arthropoda
- Class: Insecta
- Order: Lepidoptera
- Family: Coleophoridae
- Genus: Coleophora
- Species: C. saxauli

Binomial name
- Coleophora saxauli Falkovitsh, 1970

Species of moth

Coleophora saxauli is a moth of the family Coleophoridae. It is found in Turkestan and Uzbekistan.
