= Coleophora orbata =

Scientific classification
- Kingdom: Animalia
- Phylum: Arthropoda
- Class: Insecta
- Order: Lepidoptera
- Family: Coleophoridae
- Genus: Coleophora
- Species: C. orbata

Binomial name
- Coleophora orbata (Falkovitsh, 1988)

Synonyms
- Phagolamia orbata Falkovitsh, 1988

Species of moth

Coleophora orbata is a moth of the family Coleophoridae.
