= Coleophora cadella =

Scientific classification
- Kingdom: Animalia
- Phylum: Arthropoda
- Clade: Pancrustacea
- Class: Insecta
- Order: Lepidoptera
- Family: Coleophoridae
- Genus: Coleophora
- Species: C. cadella

Binomial name
- Coleophora cadella Falkovitsh, 1989

Species of moth

Coleophora cadella is a moth of the family Coleophoridae that is endemic to Kazakhstan.
