= Coleophora zagella =

Scientific classification
- Kingdom: Animalia
- Phylum: Arthropoda
- Class: Insecta
- Order: Lepidoptera
- Family: Coleophoridae
- Genus: Coleophora
- Species: C. zagella

Binomial name
- Coleophora zagella Falkovitsh, 1972

Species of moth

Coleophora zagella is a moth of the family Coleophoridae found in Mongolia.
