= Coleophora microspinella =

Scientific classification
- Kingdom: Animalia
- Phylum: Arthropoda
- Class: Insecta
- Order: Lepidoptera
- Family: Coleophoridae
- Genus: Coleophora
- Species: C. microspinella

Binomial name
- Coleophora microspinella (Reznik, 1981)

Synonyms
- Multicoloria microspinella Reznik, 1981

Species of moth

Coleophora microspinella is a moth of the family Coleophoridae. It is found by Reznik in 1981 in Turkmenistan.

The larvae feed on Artemisia species, including Artemisia turanica, Artemisia badhysi and Artemisia kopetdaghensis. They feed on the leaves of their host plant.
