= Coleophora spiralis =

Scientific classification
- Kingdom: Animalia
- Phylum: Arthropoda
- Class: Insecta
- Order: Lepidoptera
- Family: Coleophoridae
- Genus: Coleophora
- Species: C. spiralis

Binomial name
- Coleophora spiralis Falkovitsh, 1977

Synonyms
- Casignetella spiralis (Falkovitsh, 1977)

Species of moth

Coleophora spiralis is a moth of the family Coleophoridae. It is found in Mongolia.

== Subspecies ==
- Coleophora spiralis spiralis Falkovitsh, 1977
- Coleophora spiralis provecta (Falkovitsh, 1993)
