= Coleophora stepposa =

Scientific classification
- Kingdom: Animalia
- Phylum: Arthropoda
- Class: Insecta
- Order: Lepidoptera
- Family: Coleophoridae
- Genus: Coleophora
- Species: C. stepposa

Binomial name
- Coleophora stepposa Falkovitsh, 1975

Species of moth

Coleophora stepposa is a moth of the family Coleophoridae. It is found in southern Russia and Mongolia.
