= Coleophora bifurca =

Scientific classification
- Kingdom: Animalia
- Phylum: Arthropoda
- Class: Insecta
- Order: Lepidoptera
- Family: Coleophoridae
- Genus: Coleophora
- Species: C. bifurca

Binomial name
- Coleophora bifurca Falkovitsh, 1988

Species of moth

Coleophora bifurca is a moth of the family Coleophoridae.
