= Coleophora adumbratella =

Scientific classification
- Kingdom: Animalia
- Phylum: Arthropoda
- Class: Insecta
- Order: Lepidoptera
- Family: Coleophoridae
- Genus: Coleophora
- Species: C. adumbratella

Binomial name
- Coleophora adumbratella Toll & Amsel, 1967

Species of moth

Coleophora adumbratella is a moth of the family Coleophoridae that is endemic to Afghanistan.
