= Coleophora flavicosta =

Scientific classification
- Kingdom: Animalia
- Phylum: Arthropoda
- Class: Insecta
- Order: Lepidoptera
- Family: Coleophoridae
- Genus: Coleophora
- Species: C. flavicosta

Binomial name
- Coleophora flavicosta Reznik, 1974

Species of moth

Coleophora flavicosta is a moth of the family Coleophoridae. It is found in Mongolia.
