= Coleophora apythana =

Scientific classification
- Kingdom: Animalia
- Phylum: Arthropoda
- Class: Insecta
- Order: Lepidoptera
- Family: Coleophoridae
- Genus: Coleophora
- Species: C. apythana

Binomial name
- Coleophora apythana (Falkovitsh, 1989)

Synonyms
- Ecebalia apythana Falkovitsh, 1989

Species of moth

Coleophora apythana is a moth of the family Coleophoridae. It is found in the lower Volga area of southern Russia.

The larvae feed on Atriplex verrucifera.
