= Coleophora vitilis =

Scientific classification
- Kingdom: Animalia
- Phylum: Arthropoda
- Class: Insecta
- Order: Lepidoptera
- Family: Coleophoridae
- Genus: Coleophora
- Species: C. vitilis

Binomial name
- Coleophora vitilis Falkovitsh, 1973

Species of moth

Coleophora vitilis is a moth of the family Coleophoridae. It is found in Turkestan and Uzbekistan.

The wingspan is 13–15 mm.

The larvae feed on Artemisia juncea.
