= Coleophora zygotaenia =

Scientific classification
- Kingdom: Animalia
- Phylum: Arthropoda
- Class: Insecta
- Order: Lepidoptera
- Family: Coleophoridae
- Genus: Coleophora
- Species: C. zygotaenia

Binomial name
- Coleophora zygotaenia Falkovitsh, 1972

Species of moth

Coleophora zygotaenia is a moth of the family Coleophoridae. It is found in Mongolia.
