= Coleophora cycnea =

Scientific classification
- Kingdom: Animalia
- Phylum: Arthropoda
- Clade: Pancrustacea
- Class: Insecta
- Order: Lepidoptera
- Family: Coleophoridae
- Genus: Coleophora
- Species: C. cycnea

Binomial name
- Coleophora cycnea Baldizzone, 1995

Species of moth

Coleophora cycnea is a moth of the family Coleophoridae.
