= Coleophora elephantacolorella =

Scientific classification
- Kingdom: Animalia
- Phylum: Arthropoda
- Class: Insecta
- Order: Lepidoptera
- Family: Coleophoridae
- Genus: Coleophora
- Species: C. elephantacolorella

Binomial name
- Coleophora elephantacolorella Oudejans, 1971

Synonyms
- Coleophora decipiens Toll & Amsel, 1967

Species of moth

Coleophora elephantacolorella is a moth of the family Coleophoridae. It is found in Afghanistan.

== Taxonomy ==
Coleophora elephantacolorella is the replacement name for Coleophora decipiens.
