= Coleophora coriacea =

Scientific classification
- Kingdom: Animalia
- Phylum: Arthropoda
- Class: Insecta
- Order: Lepidoptera
- Family: Coleophoridae
- Genus: Coleophora
- Species: C. coriacea

Binomial name
- Coleophora coriacea Falkovitsh, 1989

Species of moth

Coleophora coriacea is a moth of the family Coleophoridae.

The larvae feed on Atraphaxis replicata, Atraphaxis virgata and Atraphaxis spinosa. They feed on the leaves of their host plant.
