= Coleophora amentastra =

Scientific classification
- Kingdom: Animalia
- Phylum: Arthropoda
- Class: Insecta
- Order: Lepidoptera
- Family: Coleophoridae
- Genus: Coleophora
- Species: C. amentastra

Binomial name
- Coleophora amentastra Falkovitsh, 1972

Species of moth

Coleophora amentastra is a moth of the family Coleophoridae that can be found in Afghanistan, Turkmenistan, Turkey, and Uzbekistan.

The larvae feed on the flower buds, flowers and fruits of Artemisia turanica and Artemisia juncea. Full-grown larvae hibernate in cracks in the soil and under stones. The larvae can be found from September to October.
