= Coleophora scioleuca =

Scientific classification
- Kingdom: Animalia
- Phylum: Arthropoda
- Class: Insecta
- Order: Lepidoptera
- Family: Coleophoridae
- Genus: Coleophora
- Species: C. scioleuca

Binomial name
- Coleophora scioleuca Meyrick, 1938

Species of moth

Coleophora scioleuca is a moth of the family Coleophoridae. It is found in Yunnan in southern China and in Nepal.
