= Coleophora leucostoma =

Scientific classification
- Kingdom: Animalia
- Phylum: Arthropoda
- Class: Insecta
- Order: Lepidoptera
- Family: Coleophoridae
- Genus: Coleophora
- Species: C. leucostoma

Binomial name
- Coleophora leucostoma Gerasimov, 1930

Species of moth

Coleophora leucostoma is a moth of the family Coleophoridae. It is found in Uzbekistan.

The length of the forewings is about 5.5 mm for males and 4–5 mm for females. Adults are on wing from April to May.
