= Coleophora facilis =

Scientific classification
- Kingdom: Animalia
- Phylum: Arthropoda
- Class: Insecta
- Order: Lepidoptera
- Family: Coleophoridae
- Genus: Coleophora
- Species: C. facilis

Binomial name
- Coleophora facilis Falkovitsh, 1988

Species of moth

Coleophora facilis is a moth of the family Coleophoridae.
