= Coleophora stuposa =

Scientific classification
- Kingdom: Animalia
- Phylum: Arthropoda
- Class: Insecta
- Order: Lepidoptera
- Family: Coleophoridae
- Genus: Coleophora
- Species: C. stuposa

Binomial name
- Coleophora stuposa (Falkovitsh, 1992)

Species of moth

Coleophora stuposa is a moth of the family Coleophoridae that can be found in Turkestan and Uzbekistan.

The wingspan is 10.5–12.5 millimetres (0.41–0.49 in).

The larvae feed on Salsola gemmascens. Larvae can be found from September to October.
