= Coleophora ghorella =

Scientific classification
- Kingdom: Animalia
- Phylum: Arthropoda
- Class: Insecta
- Order: Lepidoptera
- Family: Coleophoridae
- Genus: Coleophora
- Species: C. ghorella

Binomial name
- Coleophora ghorella Amsel, 1955

Species of moth

Coleophora ghorella is a moth of the family Coleophoridae. It is found in Jordan (the Dead Sea region).
