= Coleophora polynella =

Scientific classification
- Kingdom: Animalia
- Phylum: Arthropoda
- Class: Insecta
- Order: Lepidoptera
- Family: Coleophoridae
- Genus: Coleophora
- Species: C. polynella

Binomial name
- Coleophora polynella Falkovitsh, 1972

Species of moth

Coleophora polynella is a moth of the family Coleophoridae. It is found in Turkestan and Uzbekistan.

The larvae feed on Artemisia turanica. Larvae of the first generation can be found in May. There is also a second generation, which feeds on the fruits of the host plant.
