= Coleophora zapluta =

Scientific classification
- Kingdom: Animalia
- Phylum: Arthropoda
- Class: Insecta
- Order: Lepidoptera
- Family: Coleophoridae
- Genus: Coleophora
- Species: C. zapluta

Binomial name
- Coleophora zapluta (Falkovitsh, 1992)

Synonyms
- Apocopta zapluta Falkovitsh, 1992

Species of moth

Coleophora zapluta is a moth of the family Coleophoridae.

The larvae feed on the generative organs of Caroxylon aucheri.
