= Coleophora sublata =

Scientific classification
- Kingdom: Animalia
- Phylum: Arthropoda
- Class: Insecta
- Order: Lepidoptera
- Family: Coleophoridae
- Genus: Coleophora
- Species: C. sublata

Binomial name
- Coleophora sublata (Falkovitsh, 1988)

Synonyms
- Haploptilia sublata Falkovitsh, 1988

Species of moth

Coleophora sublata is a moth of the family Coleophoridae that is endemic to Turkmenistan.

The larvae feed on Cerasus and Crataegus species. They feed on the leaves of their host plant.
