= Coleophora cirsiella =

Scientific classification
- Kingdom: Animalia
- Phylum: Arthropoda
- Clade: Pancrustacea
- Class: Insecta
- Order: Lepidoptera
- Family: Coleophoridae
- Genus: Coleophora
- Species: C. cirsiella

Binomial name
- Coleophora cirsiella Baldizzone & Tabell, 2002

Species of moth

Coleophora cirsiella is a moth of the family Coleophoridae that is endemic to Turkey.
