= Coleophora intercalaris =

Scientific classification
- Kingdom: Animalia
- Phylum: Arthropoda
- Class: Insecta
- Order: Lepidoptera
- Family: Coleophoridae
- Genus: Coleophora
- Species: C. intercalaris

Binomial name
- Coleophora intercalaris Falkovitsh, 1988

Species of moth

Coleophora intercalaris is a moth of the family Coleophoridae.

The larvae feed on Artemisia turanica and Artemisia badhysi. They feed on the leaves of their host plant.
