= Coleophora acanthabortiva =

Scientific classification
- Kingdom: Animalia
- Phylum: Arthropoda
- Class: Insecta
- Order: Lepidoptera
- Family: Coleophoridae
- Genus: Coleophora
- Species: C. acanthabortiva

Binomial name
- Coleophora acanthabortiva H.H. Li, 2004

Species of moth

Coleophora acanthabortiva is a moth of the family Coleophoridae. It is endemic to Mongolia.
