= Coleophora contrariella =

Scientific classification
- Kingdom: Animalia
- Phylum: Arthropoda
- Class: Insecta
- Order: Lepidoptera
- Family: Coleophoridae
- Genus: Coleophora
- Species: C. contrariella

Binomial name
- Coleophora contrariella McDunnough, 1955

Species of moth

Coleophora contrariella is a moth of the family Coleophoridae that is endemic to Canada, (Nova Scotia).
