= Coleophora daglarica =

Scientific classification
- Kingdom: Animalia
- Phylum: Arthropoda
- Clade: Pancrustacea
- Class: Insecta
- Order: Lepidoptera
- Family: Coleophoridae
- Genus: Coleophora
- Species: C. daglarica

Binomial name
- Coleophora daglarica Baldizzone & Tabell, 1999

Species of moth

Coleophora daglarica is a moth of the family Coleophoridae. It is found in Turkey.
