= Coleophora bifurcella =

Scientific classification
- Kingdom: Animalia
- Phylum: Arthropoda
- Class: Insecta
- Order: Lepidoptera
- Family: Coleophoridae
- Genus: Coleophora
- Species: C. bifurcella

Binomial name
- Coleophora bifurcella Turati, 1930

Species of moth

Coleophora bifurcella is a moth of the family Coleophoridae. It is found in Asia Minor and North Africa.

The larvae feed on Artemisia species. They feed on the leaves of their host plant.
