= Coleophora kandymella =

Scientific classification
- Kingdom: Animalia
- Phylum: Arthropoda
- Class: Insecta
- Order: Lepidoptera
- Family: Coleophoridae
- Genus: Coleophora
- Species: C. kandymella

Binomial name
- Coleophora kandymella (Falkovitsh, 1988)

Synonyms
- Papyrosipha kandymella Falkovitsh, 1988

Species of moth

Coleophora kandymella is a moth of the family Coleophoridae.

The larvae feed on Calligonum setosum. They feed on the assimilation shoots of their host plant.
