= Coleophora subtremula =

Scientific classification
- Kingdom: Animalia
- Phylum: Arthropoda
- Class: Insecta
- Order: Lepidoptera
- Family: Coleophoridae
- Genus: Coleophora
- Species: C. subtremula

Binomial name
- Coleophora subtremula (Anikin, 2002)

Synonyms
- Casignetella subtremula Anikin, 2002

Species of moth

Coleophora subtremula is a moth of the family Coleophoridae. It is found in southern Russia.
