= Coleophora oxyphaea =

Scientific classification
- Kingdom: Animalia
- Phylum: Arthropoda
- Class: Insecta
- Order: Lepidoptera
- Family: Coleophoridae
- Genus: Coleophora
- Species: C. oxyphaea

Binomial name
- Coleophora oxyphaea Meyrick, 1913

Species of moth

Coleophora oxyphaea is a moth of the family Coleophoridae. It is found in South Africa.
