= Coleophora microxantha =

Scientific classification
- Kingdom: Animalia
- Phylum: Arthropoda
- Class: Insecta
- Order: Lepidoptera
- Family: Coleophoridae
- Genus: Coleophora
- Species: C. microxantha

Binomial name
- Coleophora microxantha Walsingham, 1907

Species of moth

Coleophora microxantha is a moth of the family Coleophoridae that is endemic to Algeria.

The larvae feed on Herniaria fruticosa. They feed on the leaves of their host plant.
