= Coleophora acanthophylli =

Scientific classification
- Kingdom: Animalia
- Phylum: Arthropoda
- Class: Insecta
- Order: Lepidoptera
- Family: Coleophoridae
- Genus: Coleophora
- Species: C. acanthophylli

Binomial name
- Coleophora acanthophylli Falkovitsh, 1989

Species of moth

Coleophora acanthophylli is a moth of the family Coleophoridae.

The larvae feed on the leaves of Acanthophyllum glandulosum.
