= Coleophora amseliella =

Scientific classification
- Kingdom: Animalia
- Phylum: Arthropoda
- Class: Insecta
- Order: Lepidoptera
- Family: Coleophoridae
- Genus: Coleophora
- Species: C. amseliella

Binomial name
- Coleophora amseliella Toll & Amsel, 1967

Species of moth

Coleophora amseliella is a moth of the family Coleophoridae that can be found in Afghanistan, Iran and Turkmenistan.

The larvae feed on Girgensohnia oppositiflora. They feed on the generative organs of their host plant.
