= Coleophora hoeneella =

Scientific classification
- Kingdom: Animalia
- Phylum: Arthropoda
- Clade: Pancrustacea
- Class: Insecta
- Order: Lepidoptera
- Family: Coleophoridae
- Genus: Coleophora
- Species: C. hoeneella

Binomial name
- Coleophora hoeneella Baldizzone, 1989

Species of moth

Coleophora hoeneella is a moth of the family Coleophoridae. It is known from Tibet and Korea.

The wingspan is about 15 mm.
