= Coleophora thymiphaga =

Scientific classification
- Kingdom: Animalia
- Phylum: Arthropoda
- Class: Insecta
- Order: Lepidoptera
- Family: Coleophoridae
- Genus: Coleophora
- Species: C. thymiphaga

Binomial name
- Coleophora thymiphaga (Falkovitsh, 1989)

Synonyms
- Orthographis thymiella Falkovitsh, 1988 (Junior secondary homonym of Coleophora thymiella Herrich-Schäffer, 1861); Phagolamia thymiphaga Falkovitsh, 1989 (Replacement name for Orthographis thymiella Falkovitsh, 1988)

Species of moth

Coleophora thymiphaga is a moth of the family Coleophoridae.
