= Coleophora macrura =

Scientific classification
- Kingdom: Animalia
- Phylum: Arthropoda
- Class: Insecta
- Order: Lepidoptera
- Family: Coleophoridae
- Genus: Coleophora
- Species: C. macrura

Binomial name
- Coleophora macrura Falkovitsh, 1972

Species of moth

Coleophora macrura is a moth of the family Coleophoridae. It is found in Uzbekistan.

The larvae feed on the fruit of Arbuscula arbuscula. Larvae can be found from September to the beginning of October. Fully fed larvae hibernate.
