= Coleophora alphitonella =

Scientific classification
- Kingdom: Animalia
- Phylum: Arthropoda
- Class: Insecta
- Order: Lepidoptera
- Family: Coleophoridae
- Genus: Coleophora
- Species: C. alphitonella

Binomial name
- Coleophora alphitonella Toll, 1957

Species of moth

Coleophora alphitonella is a moth of the family Coleophoridae that can be found in Algeria and Tunisia.
