= Coleophora chordoscelis =

Scientific classification
- Kingdom: Animalia
- Phylum: Arthropoda
- Class: Insecta
- Order: Lepidoptera
- Family: Coleophoridae
- Genus: Coleophora
- Species: C. chordoscelis

Binomial name
- Coleophora chordoscelis Meyrick, 1917

Species of moth

Coleophora chordoscelis is a moth of the family Coleophoridae. It is found in south-eastern India (Chennai in Tamil Nadu).

The wingspan is about 12 mm (0.47 in).
