= Coleophora sublineariella =

Scientific classification
- Kingdom: Animalia
- Phylum: Arthropoda
- Class: Insecta
- Order: Lepidoptera
- Family: Coleophoridae
- Genus: Coleophora
- Species: C. sublineariella

Binomial name
- Coleophora sublineariella Toll & Amsel, 1967

Species of moth

Coleophora sublineariella is a moth of the family Coleophoridae that can be found in Afghanistan and Turkmenistan.

The larvae feed on Cerasus and Crataegus species. They feed on the leaves of their host plant.
