= Coleophora denigrella =

Scientific classification
- Kingdom: Animalia
- Phylum: Arthropoda
- Class: Insecta
- Order: Lepidoptera
- Family: Coleophoridae
- Genus: Coleophora
- Species: C. denigrella

Binomial name
- Coleophora denigrella Gerasimov, 1930

Species of moth

Coleophora denigrella is a moth of the family Coleophoridae. It is found in Afghanistan, Uzbekistan, Turkmenistan and Turkey.

The larvae feed on Alhagi sparsifolia and Alhagi canescens. Larvae can be found from April to October in at least three generations. Fully fed larvae hibernate.
