= Coleophora angustipennis =

Scientific classification
- Kingdom: Animalia
- Phylum: Arthropoda
- Class: Insecta
- Order: Lepidoptera
- Family: Coleophoridae
- Genus: Coleophora
- Species: C. angustipennis

Binomial name
- Coleophora angustipennis Toll & Amsel, 1967

Species of moth

Coleophora angustipennis is a moth of the family Coleophoridae. It is found in Afghanistan.
