= Coleophora breyeri =

Scientific classification
- Kingdom: Animalia
- Phylum: Arthropoda
- Class: Insecta
- Order: Lepidoptera
- Family: Coleophoridae
- Genus: Coleophora
- Species: C. breyeri

Binomial name
- Coleophora breyeri Pastrana, 1963

Species of moth

Coleophora breyeri is a moth of the family Coleophoridae. It is found in Argentina.
