= Coleophora albiradiata =

Scientific classification
- Kingdom: Animalia
- Phylum: Arthropoda
- Class: Insecta
- Order: Lepidoptera
- Family: Coleophoridae
- Genus: Coleophora
- Species: C. albiradiata

Binomial name
- Coleophora albiradiata Falkovitsh, 1973

Species of moth

Coleophora albiradiata is a moth of the family Coleophoridae. It is found in southern Queensland and from coastal New South Wales to central Australia and on Java.

The wingspan is 9.5–10.5 millimetres (0.37–0.41 in).

The larvae have been reared on Rutidosis helychrysoides.
