= Coleophora novisqualorella =

Scientific classification
- Kingdom: Animalia
- Phylum: Arthropoda
- Class: Insecta
- Order: Lepidoptera
- Family: Coleophoridae
- Genus: Coleophora
- Species: C. novisqualorella

Binomial name
- Coleophora novisqualorella Li & Zheng, 1998

Species of moth

Coleophora novisqualorella is a moth of the family Coleophoridae. It is found in China.
