= Coleophora parapredotella =

Scientific classification
- Kingdom: Animalia
- Phylum: Arthropoda
- Class: Insecta
- Order: Lepidoptera
- Family: Coleophoridae
- Genus: Coleophora
- Species: C. parapredotella

Binomial name
- Coleophora parapredotella Toll & Amsel, 1967

Synonyms
- Coleophora parapredotaella

Species of moth

Coleophora parapredotella is a moth of the family Coleophoridae. It is found in Afghanistan.
