= Coleophora exarga =

Scientific classification
- Kingdom: Animalia
- Phylum: Arthropoda
- Class: Insecta
- Order: Lepidoptera
- Family: Coleophoridae
- Genus: Coleophora
- Species: C. exarga

Binomial name
- Coleophora exarga Meyrick, 1917

Species of moth

Coleophora exarga is a moth of the family Coleophoridae. It is found in Colombia.
