= Coleophora azyma =

Scientific classification
- Kingdom: Animalia
- Phylum: Arthropoda
- Class: Insecta
- Order: Lepidoptera
- Family: Coleophoridae
- Genus: Coleophora
- Species: C. azyma

Binomial name
- Coleophora azyma Falkovitsh, 1992

Species of moth

Coleophora azyma is a moth of the family Coleophoridae that is endemic to Turkmenistan.
