= Coleophora tragacanthae =

Scientific classification
- Kingdom: Animalia
- Phylum: Arthropoda
- Class: Insecta
- Order: Lepidoptera
- Family: Coleophoridae
- Genus: Coleophora
- Species: C. tragacanthae

Binomial name
- Coleophora tragacanthae (Falkovitsh, 1988)

Synonyms
- Multicoloria targacanthae Falkovitsh, 1988

Species of moth

Coleophora tragacanthae is a moth of the family Coleophoridae.

The larvae feed on the leaves of Tragacantha karakalensis.
