= Coleophora tleu =

Scientific classification
- Kingdom: Animalia
- Phylum: Arthropoda
- Class: Insecta
- Order: Lepidoptera
- Family: Coleophoridae
- Genus: Coleophora
- Species: C. tleu

Binomial name
- Coleophora tleu (Falkovitsh, 1989)

Synonyms
- Ionescumia tleu Falkovitsh, 1989

Species of moth

Coleophora tleu is a moth of the family Coleophoridae.

The larvae feed on the generative organs of Anabasis cretacea.
