= Coleophora acompha =

Scientific classification
- Kingdom: Animalia
- Phylum: Arthropoda
- Class: Insecta
- Order: Lepidoptera
- Family: Coleophoridae
- Genus: Coleophora
- Species: C. acompha

Binomial name
- Coleophora acompha (Falkovitsh, 1988)

Species of moth

Coleophora acompha is a moth of the family Coleophoridae that is endemic to Turkmenistan.
