= Coleophora bulganella =

Scientific classification
- Kingdom: Animalia
- Phylum: Arthropoda
- Class: Insecta
- Order: Lepidoptera
- Family: Coleophoridae
- Genus: Coleophora
- Species: C. bulganella

Binomial name
- Coleophora bulganella Reznik, 1974

Species of moth

Coleophora bulganella is a moth of the family Coleophoridae. It is found in Mongolia.

The larvae feed on Caragana bungei. They feed on the leaves of their host plant.
