= Coleophora caroxyli =

Scientific classification
- Kingdom: Animalia
- Phylum: Arthropoda
- Class: Insecta
- Order: Lepidoptera
- Family: Coleophoridae
- Genus: Coleophora
- Species: C. caroxyli

Binomial name
- Coleophora caroxyli Falkovitsh, 1970

Species of moth

Coleophora caroxyli is a moth of the family Coleophoridae. It is found in Uzbekistan.

They can be found from May to October. There are at least two generations per year.
