= Coleophora centrota =

Scientific classification
- Kingdom: Animalia
- Phylum: Arthropoda
- Class: Insecta
- Order: Lepidoptera
- Family: Coleophoridae
- Genus: Coleophora
- Species: C. centrota

Binomial name
- Coleophora centrota Meyrick, 1917

Species of moth

Coleophora centrota is a moth of the family Coleophoridae. It is found in Kodagu district of Karnataka, south-western India.

The wingspan is about 9 mm.
