= Coleophora acmura =

Scientific classification
- Kingdom: Animalia
- Phylum: Arthropoda
- Class: Insecta
- Order: Lepidoptera
- Family: Coleophoridae
- Genus: Coleophora
- Species: C. acmura

Binomial name
- Coleophora acmura Meyrick, 1914

Species of moth

Coleophora acmura is a moth of the family Coleophoridae that is endemic to Malawi.
