= Coleophora crypsiphanes =

Scientific classification
- Kingdom: Animalia
- Phylum: Arthropoda
- Class: Insecta
- Order: Lepidoptera
- Family: Coleophoridae
- Genus: Coleophora
- Species: C. crypsiphanes

Binomial name
- Coleophora crypsiphanes Meyrick, 1917

Species of moth

Coleophora crypsiphanes is a moth of the family Coleophoridae that is endemic to Sri Lanka.

The wingspan is 10 millimetres (0.39 in) for males and 14–16 millimetres (0.55–0.63 in) for females.
