= Coleophora cochleata =

Scientific classification
- Kingdom: Animalia
- Phylum: Arthropoda
- Class: Insecta
- Order: Lepidoptera
- Family: Coleophoridae
- Genus: Coleophora
- Species: C. cochleata

Binomial name
- Coleophora cochleata Falkovitsh, 2005

Species of moth

Coleophora cochleata is a moth of the family Coleophoridae.
