= Coleophora traganella =

Scientific classification
- Kingdom: Animalia
- Phylum: Arthropoda
- Class: Insecta
- Order: Lepidoptera
- Family: Coleophoridae
- Genus: Coleophora
- Species: C. traganella

Binomial name
- Coleophora traganella Chrétien, 1915

Species of insect

Coleophora traganella is a moth of the family Coleophoridae. It is found in Algeria, Tunisia and Egypt.

The larvae feed on the leaves of Traganum nudatum.
