= Coleophora sobria =

Scientific classification
- Kingdom: Animalia
- Phylum: Arthropoda
- Clade: Pancrustacea
- Class: Insecta
- Order: Lepidoptera
- Family: Coleophoridae
- Genus: Coleophora
- Species: C. sobria

Binomial name
- Coleophora sobria Baldizzone, 1994

Species of moth

Coleophora sobria is a moth of the family Coleophoridae.
