= Coleophora inversella =

Scientific classification
- Kingdom: Animalia
- Phylum: Arthropoda
- Class: Insecta
- Order: Lepidoptera
- Family: Coleophoridae
- Genus: Coleophora
- Species: C. inversella

Binomial name
- Coleophora inversella Turati, 1934

Species of moth

Coleophora inversella is a moth of the family Coleophoridae. It is found in Libya.
