= Coleophora genuina =

Scientific classification
- Kingdom: Animalia
- Phylum: Arthropoda
- Class: Insecta
- Order: Lepidoptera
- Family: Coleophoridae
- Genus: Coleophora
- Species: C. genuina

Binomial name
- Coleophora genuina Falkovitsh, 1988

Species of moth

Coleophora genuina is a moth of the family Coleophoridae.
