= Coleophora lonchodes =

Scientific classification
- Kingdom: Animalia
- Phylum: Arthropoda
- Class: Insecta
- Order: Lepidoptera
- Family: Coleophoridae
- Genus: Coleophora
- Species: C. lonchodes

Binomial name
- Coleophora lonchodes (Falkovitsh, 1994)

Synonyms
- Aporiptura lonchodes Falkovitsh, 1994

Species of moth

Coleophora lonchodes is a moth of the family Coleophoridae. It is found in southern Russia and central Asia. It occurs in desert-steppe biotopes.

Adults are on wing from late April to June.

The larvae feed on the carpels of Suaeda physophora.
