= Coleophora retifera =

Scientific classification
- Kingdom: Animalia
- Phylum: Arthropoda
- Class: Insecta
- Order: Lepidoptera
- Family: Coleophoridae
- Genus: Coleophora
- Species: C. retifera

Binomial name
- Coleophora retifera Meyrick, 1922

Synonyms
- Coleophora cribrella Toll, 1960; Coleophora pseudoobviella Toll, 1962

Species of moth

Coleophora retifera is a moth of the family Coleophoridae. It is found in Spain, Israel, the Palestinian Territories and Algeria.
