= Coleophora kondarensis =

Scientific classification
- Kingdom: Animalia
- Phylum: Arthropoda
- Class: Insecta
- Order: Lepidoptera
- Family: Coleophoridae
- Genus: Coleophora
- Species: C. kondarensis

Binomial name
- Coleophora kondarensis (Reznik, 1976)

Synonyms
- Multicolaria kondarensis Reznik, 1976

Species of moth

Coleophora kondarensis is a moth of the family Coleophoridae. It is found in Tajikistan.

The larvae feed on Astragalus sieversianus. They feed on the leaves of their host plant.
