= Coleophora tacera =

Scientific classification
- Kingdom: Animalia
- Phylum: Arthropoda
- Class: Insecta
- Order: Lepidoptera
- Family: Coleophoridae
- Genus: Coleophora
- Species: C. tacera

Binomial name
- Coleophora tacera Bradley, 1965

Species of moth

Coleophora tacera is a moth of the family Coleophoridae. It is found in Uganda.
