= Coleophora poecilella =

Scientific classification
- Kingdom: Animalia
- Phylum: Arthropoda
- Class: Insecta
- Order: Lepidoptera
- Family: Coleophoridae
- Genus: Coleophora
- Species: C. poecilella

Binomial name
- Coleophora poecilella Walsingham, 1907

Species of moth

Coleophora poecilella is a moth of the family Coleophoridae that is endemic to Algeria.

The larvae feed on Suaeda vermiculata. They feed within stem galls on their host plant.
