= Coleophora pannosa =

Scientific classification
- Kingdom: Animalia
- Phylum: Arthropoda
- Class: Insecta
- Order: Lepidoptera
- Family: Coleophoridae
- Genus: Coleophora
- Species: C. pannosa

Binomial name
- Coleophora pannosa (Falkovitsh, 1992)

Synonyms
- Ionescumia pannosa Falkovitsh, 1992

Species of moth

Coleophora pannosa is a moth of the family Coleophoridae.
