= Coleophora incultella =

Scientific classification
- Kingdom: Animalia
- Phylum: Arthropoda
- Class: Insecta
- Order: Lepidoptera
- Family: Coleophoridae
- Genus: Coleophora
- Species: C. incultella

Binomial name
- Coleophora incultella Toll, 1952

Species of moth

Coleophora incultella is a moth of the family Coleophoridae that is endemic to Algeria.
