= Coleophora xanthochlora =

Scientific classification
- Kingdom: Animalia
- Phylum: Arthropoda
- Class: Insecta
- Order: Lepidoptera
- Family: Coleophoridae
- Genus: Coleophora
- Species: C. xanthochlora

Binomial name
- Coleophora xanthochlora Toll, 1956

Species of moth

Coleophora xanthochlora is a moth of the family Coleophoridae. It is found in Tunisia.
