= Coleophora glymma =

Scientific classification
- Kingdom: Animalia
- Phylum: Arthropoda
- Class: Insecta
- Order: Lepidoptera
- Family: Coleophoridae
- Genus: Coleophora
- Species: C. glymma

Binomial name
- Coleophora glymma Falkovitsh, 1989

Species of moth

Coleophora glymma is a moth of the family Coleophoridae.

The larvae feed on Suaeda confusa. They feed on the generative organs of their host plant.
