= Coleophora adrianae =

Scientific classification
- Kingdom: Animalia
- Phylum: Arthropoda
- Clade: Pancrustacea
- Class: Insecta
- Order: Lepidoptera
- Family: Coleophoridae
- Genus: Coleophora
- Species: C. adrianae

Binomial name
- Coleophora adrianae van der Wolf, 1999

Species of moth

Coleophora adrianae is a moth of the family Coleophoridae that can be found in Argentina and Chile.
