= Coleophora cteis =

Scientific classification
- Kingdom: Animalia
- Phylum: Arthropoda
- Class: Insecta
- Order: Lepidoptera
- Family: Coleophoridae
- Genus: Coleophora
- Species: C. cteis

Binomial name
- Coleophora cteis Reznik, 1975

Species of moth

Coleophora cteis is a moth of the family Coleophoridae that is endemic to Mongolia.
