= Coleophora quadrifariella =

Scientific classification
- Kingdom: Animalia
- Phylum: Arthropoda
- Class: Insecta
- Order: Lepidoptera
- Family: Coleophoridae
- Genus: Coleophora
- Species: C. quadrifariella

Binomial name
- Coleophora quadrifariella Staudinger, 1880

Species of moth

Coleophora quadrifariella is a moth of the family Coleophoridae. It is found in Russia (Volga region) and Kazakhstan.
