= Coleophora linoplecta =

Scientific classification
- Kingdom: Animalia
- Phylum: Arthropoda
- Class: Insecta
- Order: Lepidoptera
- Family: Coleophoridae
- Genus: Coleophora
- Species: C. linoplecta

Binomial name
- Coleophora linoplecta Meyrick, 1924

Species of moth

Coleophora linoplecta is a moth of the family Coleophoridae. It is found in Egypt.
