= Coleophora echinopsilonella =

Scientific classification
- Kingdom: Animalia
- Phylum: Arthropoda
- Class: Insecta
- Order: Lepidoptera
- Family: Coleophoridae
- Genus: Coleophora
- Species: C. echinopsilonella

Binomial name
- Coleophora echinopsilonella Chrétien, 1915

Synonyms
- Coleophora icarella Toll, 1957

Species of moth

Coleophora echinopsilonella is a moth of the family Coleophoridae. It is found in Algeria, Libya and Tunisia.

The larvae feed on Bassia muricata. They feed on the leaves of their host plant.
