= Coleophora kizildashi =

Scientific classification
- Kingdom: Animalia
- Phylum: Arthropoda
- Class: Insecta
- Order: Lepidoptera
- Family: Coleophoridae
- Genus: Coleophora
- Species: C. kizildashi

Binomial name
- Coleophora kizildashi (Anikin, 2002)

Synonyms
- Ecebalia kizildashi Anikin, 2002

Species of moth

Coleophora kizildashi is a moth of the family Coleophoridae which is endemic to Armenia.
