= Coleophora echyropis =

Scientific classification
- Kingdom: Animalia
- Phylum: Arthropoda
- Class: Insecta
- Order: Lepidoptera
- Family: Coleophoridae
- Genus: Coleophora
- Species: C. echyropis

Binomial name
- Coleophora echyropis Meyrick, 1939

Species of moth

Coleophora echyropis is a moth of the family Coleophoridae. It is found in Kashmir.

The wingspan is about 14 mm.
