= Coleophora micromeriae =

Scientific classification
- Kingdom: Animalia
- Phylum: Arthropoda
- Class: Insecta
- Order: Lepidoptera
- Family: Coleophoridae
- Genus: Coleophora
- Species: C. micromeriae

Binomial name
- Coleophora micromeriae Walsingham, 1908

Species of moth

Coleophora micromeriae is a moth of the family Coleophoridae. It is found in the Canary Islands.

The larvae feed on Micromeria varia. Larvae can be found from January to March.
