= Coleophora paraptarmica =

Scientific classification
- Kingdom: Animalia
- Phylum: Arthropoda
- Class: Insecta
- Order: Lepidoptera
- Family: Coleophoridae
- Genus: Coleophora
- Species: C. paraptarmica

Binomial name
- Coleophora paraptarmica Toll & Amsel, 1967

Species of moth

Coleophora paraptarmica is a moth of the family Coleophoridae. It is found in Afghanistan, Central Asia and Pakistan.

The larvae feed on Artemisia turanica. Larvae can found in the beginning of June and (after diapause) in May.
