= Coleophora turkestanica =

Scientific classification
- Kingdom: Animalia
- Phylum: Arthropoda
- Class: Insecta
- Order: Lepidoptera
- Family: Coleophoridae
- Genus: Coleophora
- Species: C. turkestanica

Binomial name
- Coleophora turkestanica (Falkovitsh, 1989)

Synonyms
- Carpochena turkestanica Falkovitsh, 1989

Species of moth

Coleophora turkestanica is a moth of the family Coleophoridae.

The larvae feed on the generative organs of Caroxylon turkestanicum.
