= Coleophora vegrandis =

Scientific classification
- Kingdom: Animalia
- Phylum: Arthropoda
- Class: Insecta
- Order: Lepidoptera
- Family: Coleophoridae
- Genus: Coleophora
- Species: C. vegrandis

Binomial name
- Coleophora vegrandis (Falkovitsh, 1992)

Synonyms
- Ionescumia vegrandis Falkovitsh, 1992

Species of moth

Coleophora vegrandis is a moth of the family Coleophoridae.
