= Coleophora anthocalia =

Scientific classification
- Kingdom: Animalia
- Phylum: Arthropoda
- Class: Insecta
- Order: Lepidoptera
- Family: Coleophoridae
- Genus: Coleophora
- Species: C. anthocalia

Binomial name
- Coleophora anthocalia Falkovitsh, 1978

Species of moth

Coleophora anthocalia is a moth of the family Coleophoridae. It is found in Tajikistan.

The larvae feed on Atraphaxis pyrifolia. They feed on the flower buds of their host plant.
