= Coleophora argopleura =

Scientific classification
- Kingdom: Animalia
- Phylum: Arthropoda
- Class: Insecta
- Order: Lepidoptera
- Family: Coleophoridae
- Genus: Coleophora
- Species: C. argopleura

Binomial name
- Coleophora argopleura Meyrick, 1917

Species of moth

Coleophora argopleura is a moth of the family Coleophoridae. It is found in northern Pakistan, Kashmir and north-eastern Afghanistan.

The wingspan is about 18 mm.
