= Coleophora margarita =

Scientific classification
- Kingdom: Animalia
- Phylum: Arthropoda
- Class: Insecta
- Order: Lepidoptera
- Family: Coleophoridae
- Genus: Coleophora
- Species: C. margarita

Binomial name
- Coleophora margarita (Falkovitsh, 1989)

Synonyms
- Aureliania margarita Falkovitsh, 1989

Species of moth

Coleophora margarita is a moth of the family Coleophoridae.

The larvae feed on Caroxylon turkestanicum. They feed on the generative organs of their host plant.
