= Coleophora iljiniae =

Scientific classification
- Kingdom: Animalia
- Phylum: Arthropoda
- Class: Insecta
- Order: Lepidoptera
- Family: Coleophoridae
- Genus: Coleophora
- Species: C. iljiniae

Binomial name
- Coleophora iljiniae Falkovitsh, 1989

Species of moth

Coleophora iljiniae is a moth of the family Coleophoridae. It is found in Kazakhstan.

The larvae feed on Iljinia regelii. They feed on the leaves of their host plant.
