= Coleophora luciennella =

Scientific classification
- Kingdom: Animalia
- Phylum: Arthropoda
- Class: Insecta
- Order: Lepidoptera
- Family: Coleophoridae
- Genus: Coleophora
- Species: C. luciennella

Binomial name
- Coleophora luciennella Nel, 1992

Species of moth

Coleophora luciennella is a moth of the family Coleophoridae. It is found in France.
