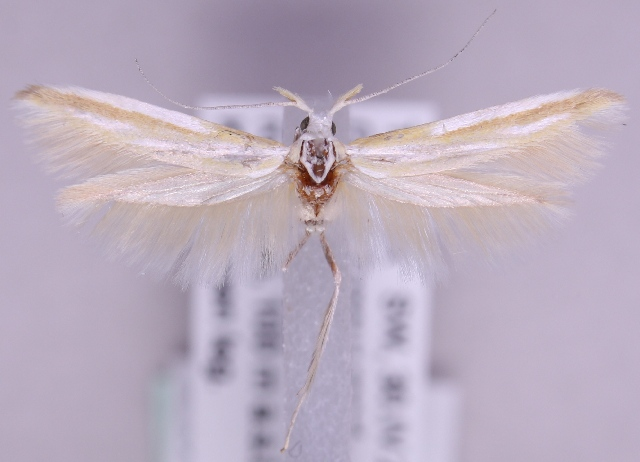

Scientific classification
- Kingdom: Animalia
- Phylum: Arthropoda
- Class: Insecta
- Order: Lepidoptera
- Family: Coleophoridae
- Genus: Coleophora
- Species: C. acanthyllidis

Binomial name
- Coleophora acanthyllidis Walsingham, 1907

Synonyms
- Coleophora radiosella (Toll, 1952); Coleophora tozeurensis (Toll, 1956)

= Coleophora acanthyllidis =

Species of moth

Coleophora acanthyllidis is a moth of the family Coleophoridae. It is found in Algeria and Tunisia.
