= Coleophora inequidentella =

Scientific classification
- Kingdom: Animalia
- Phylum: Arthropoda
- Class: Insecta
- Order: Lepidoptera
- Family: Coleophoridae
- Genus: Coleophora
- Species: C. inequidentella

Binomial name
- Coleophora inequidentella Toll & Amsel, 1967

Species of moth

Coleophora inequidentella is a moth of the family Coleophoridae. It is found in Afghanistan.
