= Coleophora nigrosparsella =

Scientific classification
- Kingdom: Animalia
- Phylum: Arthropoda
- Class: Insecta
- Order: Lepidoptera
- Family: Coleophoridae
- Genus: Coleophora
- Species: C. nigrosparsella

Binomial name
- Coleophora nigrosparsella Toll & Amsel, 1967

Species of moth

Coleophora nigrosparsella is a moth belonging to the family Coleophoridae. It is found in Afghanistan.
