= Coleophora confusa =

Scientific classification
- Kingdom: Animalia
- Phylum: Arthropoda
- Class: Insecta
- Order: Lepidoptera
- Family: Coleophoridae
- Genus: Coleophora
- Species: C. confusa

Binomial name
- Coleophora confusa Staudinger, 1880

Species of moth

Coleophora confusa is a moth of the family Coleophoridae. It is found in Asia Minor.
