= Coleophora arenifera =

Scientific classification
- Kingdom: Animalia
- Phylum: Arthropoda
- Class: Insecta
- Order: Lepidoptera
- Family: Coleophoridae
- Genus: Coleophora
- Species: C. arenifera

Binomial name
- Coleophora arenifera Falkovitsh, 1989

Species of moth

Coleophora arenifera is a moth of the family Coleophoridae that is endemic to Kazakhstan.

The larvae feed on Artemisia terrae-albae. They feed on the leaves of their host plant.
