= Coleophora aglabitella =

Scientific classification
- Kingdom: Animalia
- Phylum: Arthropoda
- Class: Insecta
- Order: Lepidoptera
- Family: Coleophoridae
- Genus: Coleophora
- Species: C. aglabitella

Binomial name
- Coleophora aglabitella Chrétien, 1915

Species of moth

Coleophora aglabitella is a moth of the family Coleophoridae that is endemic to Tunisia.
