= Coleophora climacopterae =

Scientific classification
- Kingdom: Animalia
- Phylum: Arthropoda
- Class: Insecta
- Order: Lepidoptera
- Family: Coleophoridae
- Genus: Coleophora
- Species: C. climacopterae

Binomial name
- Coleophora climacopterae Falkovitsh, 1978

Species of moth

Coleophora climacopterae is a moth of the family Coleophoridae. It is found in Turkestan, Kyrgyzstan and China.

The larvae feed on Climacopiera species. They can be found in October.
