= Coleophora symphistropha =

Scientific classification
- Kingdom: Animalia
- Phylum: Arthropoda
- Class: Insecta
- Order: Lepidoptera
- Family: Coleophoridae
- Genus: Coleophora
- Species: C. symphistropha

Binomial name
- Coleophora symphistropha (Reznik, 1976)

Synonyms
- Multicoloria symphistropha Reznik, 1976

Species of moth

Coleophora symphistropha is a moth of the family Coleophoridae. It is found in Turkey.
