= Coleophora zymotica =

Scientific classification
- Kingdom: Animalia
- Phylum: Arthropoda
- Clade: Pancrustacea
- Class: Insecta
- Order: Lepidoptera
- Family: Coleophoridae
- Genus: Coleophora
- Species: C. zymotica

Binomial name
- Coleophora zymotica Meyrick, 1931

Species of moth

Coleophora zymotica is a moth of the family Coleophoridae. It is found in Chaco, Paraguay.

The wingspan is 8–9 mm (0.31–0.35 in).

== Description ==
Coleophora zymotica is a small moth with a wingspan of approximately 8–9 mm. The head, palpi, and thorax are whitish in colour, while the palpi are simple and straight. The antennae are also simple, white, and lightly ringed with pale ochreous.

The forewings are yellowish-ochreous and finely sprinkled with grey. The costal margin is marked up to beyond the middle of the wing, and the veins are distinctly outlined.
