= Coleophora villosa =

Scientific classification
- Kingdom: Animalia
- Phylum: Arthropoda
- Class: Insecta
- Order: Lepidoptera
- Family: Coleophoridae
- Genus: Coleophora
- Species: C. villosa

Binomial name
- Coleophora villosa (Falkovitsh, 1989)

Synonyms
- Aureliania villosa Falkovitsh, 1989

Species of moth

Coleophora villosa is a moth of the family Coleophoridae. It is found in Kazakhstan.

The larvae feed on the generative organs of Kochia prostrate and Camphorosma lessingii.
