= Coleophora synchrona =

Scientific classification
- Kingdom: Animalia
- Phylum: Arthropoda
- Class: Insecta
- Order: Lepidoptera
- Family: Coleophoridae
- Genus: Coleophora
- Species: C. synchrona

Binomial name
- Coleophora synchrona (Falkovitsh, 1988)

Synonyms
- Atractula synchrona Falkovitsh, 1988

Species of moth

Coleophora synchrona is a moth of the family Coleophoridae. It is found in Kazakhstan, Turkmenistan and Iran.

The larvae feed on the leaves of Lycium kopetdaghi and Lycium gasystemum.
