= Coleophora kashkaella =

Scientific classification
- Kingdom: Animalia
- Phylum: Arthropoda
- Class: Insecta
- Order: Lepidoptera
- Family: Coleophoridae
- Genus: Coleophora
- Species: C. kashkaella

Binomial name
- Coleophora kashkaella Toll & Amsel, 1967

Species of moth

Coleophora kashkaella is a moth of the family Coleophoridae. It is found in Afghanistan.

The larvae feed on Artemisia badhysi and Artemisia kopetdaghensis. They feed on the leaves of their host plant.
