= Coleophora majuscula =

Scientific classification
- Kingdom: Animalia
- Phylum: Arthropoda
- Class: Insecta
- Order: Lepidoptera
- Family: Coleophoridae
- Genus: Coleophora
- Species: C. majuscula

Binomial name
- Coleophora majuscula (Falkovitsh, 1991)

Synonyms
- Casignetella majuscula Falkovitsh, 1991

Species of moth

Coleophora majuscula is a moth of the family Coleophoridae. It is found in Azerbaijan.

The larvae feed on Acanthophyllum mucronatum. They feed on the leaves of their host plant.
