= Coleophora ortrina =

Scientific classification
- Kingdom: Animalia
- Phylum: Arthropoda
- Class: Insecta
- Order: Lepidoptera
- Family: Coleophoridae
- Genus: Coleophora
- Species: C. ortrina

Binomial name
- Coleophora ortrina (Reznik, 1976)

Synonyms
- Multicoloria ortrina Reznik, 1976

Species of moth

Coleophora ortrina is a moth of the family Coleophoridae. It is found in Russia (Ussuri).
