= Coleophora apta =

Scientific classification
- Kingdom: Animalia
- Phylum: Arthropoda
- Class: Insecta
- Order: Lepidoptera
- Family: Coleophoridae
- Genus: Coleophora
- Species: C. apta

Binomial name
- Coleophora apta Falkovitsh, 1991

Species of moth

Coleophora apta is a moth of the family Coleophoridae.

The larvae feed on Girgensohnia oppositiflora. They feed on the generative organs of their host plant.
