= Coleophora cyrta =

Scientific classification
- Kingdom: Animalia
- Phylum: Arthropoda
- Class: Insecta
- Order: Lepidoptera
- Family: Coleophoridae
- Genus: Coleophora
- Species: C. cyrta

Binomial name
- Coleophora cyrta Falkovitsh, 1973

Species of moth

Coleophora cyrta is a moth of the family Coleophoridae. It is found in Turkestan and Uzbekistan.

The wingspan is 14–15 mm.

The larvae feed on Salsola species, including Salsola orientalis. Larvae can be found from the end of September to October.
