= Coleophora hymenocrateri =

Scientific classification
- Kingdom: Animalia
- Phylum: Arthropoda
- Class: Insecta
- Order: Lepidoptera
- Family: Coleophoridae
- Genus: Coleophora
- Species: C. hymenocrateri

Binomial name
- Coleophora hymenocrateri Falkovitsh, 1988

Species of moth

Coleophora hymenocrateri is a moth of the family Coleophoridae. It is found in Turkmenistan. The larvae feed on Hymenocrater bituminosus. They feed on the leaves of their host plant.
