= Coleophora hypomona =

Scientific classification
- Kingdom: Animalia
- Phylum: Arthropoda
- Class: Insecta
- Order: Lepidoptera
- Family: Coleophoridae
- Genus: Coleophora
- Species: C. hypomona

Binomial name
- Coleophora hypomona Falkovitsh, 1979

Species of moth

Coleophora hypomona is a moth of the family Coleophoridae. It is found in Turkestan and Uzbekistan.
