= Coleophora unicrenata =

Scientific classification
- Kingdom: Animalia
- Phylum: Arthropoda
- Class: Insecta
- Order: Lepidoptera
- Family: Coleophoridae
- Genus: Coleophora
- Species: C. unicrenata

Binomial name
- Coleophora unicrenata Reznik, 1975

Species of moth

Coleophora unicrenata is a moth of the family Coleophoridae. It is found in Mongolia.
