= Coleophora delicatella =

Scientific classification
- Kingdom: Animalia
- Phylum: Arthropoda
- Class: Insecta
- Order: Lepidoptera
- Family: Coleophoridae
- Genus: Coleophora
- Species: C. delicatella

Binomial name
- Coleophora delicatella Toll & Amsel, 1967

Species of moth

Coleophora delicatella is a moth of the family Coleophoridae. It is found in Afghanistan.

The larvae feed on Caroxylon turkestanicum. They feed on the generative organs of their host plant.
