= Coleophora zhusani =

Scientific classification
- Kingdom: Animalia
- Phylum: Arthropoda
- Class: Insecta
- Order: Lepidoptera
- Family: Coleophoridae
- Genus: Coleophora
- Species: C. zhusani

Binomial name
- Coleophora zhusani Falkovitsh, 1972

Species of moth

Coleophora zhusani is a moth of the family Coleophoridae. It is found in Turkestan and Uzbekistan.

The larvae feed on the leaves of Artemisia turanica. Larvae can be found in the beginning of June and (after diapause) again from April to May. Young larvae hibernate.
