= Coleophora comperta =

Scientific classification
- Kingdom: Animalia
- Phylum: Arthropoda
- Class: Insecta
- Order: Lepidoptera
- Family: Coleophoridae
- Genus: Coleophora
- Species: C. comperta

Binomial name
- Coleophora comperta Falkovitsh, 1992

Species of moth

Coleophora comperta is a moth of the family Coleophoridae.
