= Coleophora velocella =

Scientific classification
- Kingdom: Animalia
- Phylum: Arthropoda
- Class: Insecta
- Order: Lepidoptera
- Family: Coleophoridae
- Genus: Coleophora
- Species: C. velocella

Binomial name
- Coleophora velocella (Falkovitsh, 1989)

Synonyms
- Aureliania velocella Falkovitsh, 1989

Species of moth

Coleophora velocella is a moth of the family Coleophoridae. It is found in Kazakhstan.

The larvae feed on the generative organs of Kalidium caspicum.
