= Coleophora voluta =

Scientific classification
- Kingdom: Animalia
- Phylum: Arthropoda
- Class: Insecta
- Order: Lepidoptera
- Family: Coleophoridae
- Genus: Coleophora
- Species: C. voluta

Binomial name
- Coleophora voluta (Falkovitsh, 1992)

Synonyms
- Carpochena voluta Falkovitsh, 1992

Species of moth

Coleophora voluta is a moth of the family Coleophoridae.

The larvae feed on the generative organs of Caroxylon tomentosum bungeanum.
