= Coleophora intexta =

Scientific classification
- Kingdom: Animalia
- Phylum: Arthropoda
- Class: Insecta
- Order: Lepidoptera
- Family: Coleophoridae
- Genus: Coleophora
- Species: C. intexta

Binomial name
- Coleophora intexta Meyrick, 1917

Species of moth

Coleophora intexta is a moth of the family Coleophoridae. It is found in Peru.
