= Coleophora praecipua =

Scientific classification
- Kingdom: Animalia
- Phylum: Arthropoda
- Class: Insecta
- Order: Lepidoptera
- Family: Coleophoridae
- Genus: Coleophora
- Species: C. praecipua

Binomial name
- Coleophora praecipua Walsingham, 1907

Synonyms
- Coleophora latistriella Turati, 1934; Coleophora latistrigella Turati, 1934; Coleophora stimuligera Meyrick, 1936

Species of insect

Coleophora praecipua is a moth of the family Coleophoridae. It is found in Algeria, Libya and Saudi Arabia.
