= Coleophora longicornuta =

Scientific classification
- Kingdom: Animalia
- Phylum: Arthropoda
- Class: Insecta
- Order: Lepidoptera
- Family: Coleophoridae
- Genus: Coleophora
- Species: C. longicornuta

Binomial name
- Coleophora longicornuta Li & Zheng, 1998

Species of moth

Coleophora longicornuta is a moth of the family Coleophoridae.
