= Coleophora trivalvis =

Scientific classification
- Kingdom: Animalia
- Phylum: Arthropoda
- Class: Insecta
- Order: Lepidoptera
- Family: Coleophoridae
- Genus: Coleophora
- Species: C. trivalvis

Binomial name
- Coleophora trivalvis (Falkovitsh, 1989)

Synonyms
- Papyrosipha trivalvis Falkovitsh, 1989

Species of moth

Coleophora trivalvis is a moth of the family Coleophoridae.

The larvae feed on the buds and blossoming out leaves of Atraphaxis badghysi.
