= Coleophora liriophorella =

Scientific classification
- Kingdom: Animalia
- Phylum: Arthropoda
- Clade: Pancrustacea
- Class: Insecta
- Order: Lepidoptera
- Family: Coleophoridae
- Genus: Coleophora
- Species: C. liriophorella

Binomial name
- Coleophora liriophorella Baldizzone, 1982

Species of moth

Coleophora liriophorella is a moth of the family Coleophoridae. It is found in Morocco.

The larvae feed on Cytisus linifolius. They feed on the leaves of their host plant.
