= Coleophora comata =

Scientific classification
- Kingdom: Animalia
- Phylum: Arthropoda
- Class: Insecta
- Order: Lepidoptera
- Family: Coleophoridae
- Genus: Coleophora
- Species: C. comata

Binomial name
- Coleophora comata Falcons, 1986

Species of moth

Coleophora comata is a moth of the family Coleophoridae. It is found in Turkestan.
