= Coleophora summivola =

Scientific classification
- Kingdom: Animalia
- Phylum: Arthropoda
- Class: Insecta
- Order: Lepidoptera
- Family: Coleophoridae
- Genus: Coleophora
- Species: C. summivola

Binomial name
- Coleophora summivola Meyrick, 1930

Species of moth

Coleophora summivola is a moth of the family Coleophoridae. It is found in China.
