= Coleophora kaiynella =

Scientific classification
- Kingdom: Animalia
- Phylum: Arthropoda
- Class: Insecta
- Order: Lepidoptera
- Family: Coleophoridae
- Genus: Coleophora
- Species: C. kaiynella

Binomial name
- Coleophora kaiynella (Falkovitsh, 1991)

Synonyms
- Zagulajevia kaiynella Falkovitsh, 1991

Species of moth

Coleophora kaiynella is a moth of the family Coleophoridae. It is found in Kyrgyzstan.

The larvae feed on Betula species, including Betula tianshanica. They feed on the leaves of their host plant.

== Subspecies ==
- Coleophora kaiynella kaiynella
- Coleophora kaiynella talasensis (Falkovitsh, 1991)
