= Coleophora praeclara =

Scientific classification
- Kingdom: Animalia
- Phylum: Arthropoda
- Clade: Pancrustacea
- Class: Insecta
- Order: Lepidoptera
- Family: Coleophoridae
- Genus: Coleophora
- Species: C. praeclara

Binomial name
- Coleophora praeclara Baldizzone, 1994

Species of moth

Coleophora praeclara is a moth of the family Coleophoridae.

The larvae feed on Astragalus species, including Astragalus paghmanicus. They feed on the leaves of their host plant.
