= Coleophora dendroidis =

Scientific classification
- Kingdom: Animalia
- Phylum: Arthropoda
- Class: Insecta
- Order: Lepidoptera
- Family: Coleophoridae
- Genus: Coleophora
- Species: C. dendroidis

Binomial name
- Coleophora dendroidis Falkovitsh, 1989

Species of moth

Coleophora dendroidis is a moth of the family Coleophoridae.

The larvae feed on Caroxylon dendroides. They feed on the generative organs of their host plant.
