= Coleophora lentiginosa =

Scientific classification
- Kingdom: Animalia
- Phylum: Arthropoda
- Class: Insecta
- Order: Lepidoptera
- Family: Coleophoridae
- Genus: Coleophora
- Species: C. lentiginosa

Binomial name
- Coleophora lentiginosa (Petshen, 1989)

Synonyms
- Apocopta lentiginosa Petshen, 1989

Species of moth

Coleophora lentiginosa is a moth of the family Coleophoridae.

The larvae feed on Climacoptera species. They feed on the generative organs of their host plant.
