= Coleophora enchitis =

Scientific classification
- Kingdom: Animalia
- Phylum: Arthropoda
- Class: Insecta
- Order: Lepidoptera
- Family: Coleophoridae
- Genus: Coleophora
- Species: C. enchitis

Binomial name
- Coleophora enchitis Meyrick, 1920

Species of moth

Coleophora enchitis is a moth of the family Coleophoridae. It is found in Kenya.
