= Coleophora chretieniella =

Scientific classification
- Kingdom: Animalia
- Phylum: Arthropoda
- Class: Insecta
- Order: Lepidoptera
- Family: Coleophoridae
- Genus: Coleophora
- Species: C. chretieniella

Binomial name
- Coleophora chretieniella Oudejans, 1971

Synonyms
- Coleophora bipunctella Chrétien, 1915

Species of moth

Coleophora chretieniella is a moth of the family Coleophoridae. It is found in Tunisia.

== Taxonomy ==
Coleophora chretieniella is the replacement name for Coleophora bipunctella.
