= Coleophora honestella =

Scientific classification
- Kingdom: Animalia
- Phylum: Arthropoda
- Class: Insecta
- Order: Lepidoptera
- Family: Coleophoridae
- Genus: Coleophora
- Species: C. honestella

Binomial name
- Coleophora honestella Toll, 1952

Species of moth

Coleophora honestella is a moth of the family Coleophoridae that can be found in Algeria, Libya and Morocco.
