= Coleophora irinella =

Scientific classification
- Kingdom: Animalia
- Phylum: Arthropoda
- Class: Insecta
- Order: Lepidoptera
- Family: Coleophoridae
- Genus: Coleophora
- Species: C. irinella

Binomial name
- Coleophora irinella (Anikin, 1999)

Synonyms
- Perygra irinella Anikin, 1999

Species of moth

Coleophora irinella is a moth of the family Coleophoridae. It is found in the Russian Far East.
