= Coleophora paraononidella =

Scientific classification
- Kingdom: Animalia
- Phylum: Arthropoda
- Class: Insecta
- Order: Lepidoptera
- Family: Coleophoridae
- Genus: Coleophora
- Species: C. paraononidella

Binomial name
- Coleophora paraononidella Amsel, 1935

Species of moth

Coleophora paraononidella is a moth of the family Coleophoridae. It is found in Afghanistan, the Palestinian Territories and Turkestan.

The larvae feed on Cousinia schistoptera, Cousinia albiflora and Cousinia raddeana. They feed on the leaves of their host plant.
