= Coleophora fulvociliella =

Scientific classification
- Kingdom: Animalia
- Phylum: Arthropoda
- Class: Insecta
- Order: Lepidoptera
- Family: Coleophoridae
- Genus: Coleophora
- Species: C. fulvociliella

Binomial name
- Coleophora fulvociliella Chrétien, 1915

Synonyms
- Coleophora argentulella Turati, 1924

Species of moth

Coleophora fulvociliella is a moth of the family Coleophoridae. It is found in Algeria and Libya.
