= Coleophora schibendyella =

Scientific classification
- Kingdom: Animalia
- Phylum: Arthropoda
- Clade: Pancrustacea
- Class: Insecta
- Order: Lepidoptera
- Family: Coleophoridae
- Genus: Coleophora
- Species: C. schibendyella

Binomial name
- Coleophora schibendyella Baldizzone & Tabell, 2007

Species of moth

Coleophora schibendyella is a moth of the family Coleophoridae. It is found in the southern Ural Mountains and the lower Volga region in Russia.

The wingspan is 12.5–14 mm.

== Etymology ==
The specific name refers to the Schibendy valley, which is one of the collecting sites of the taxon.
