= Coleophora pseudofuscoaenea =

Scientific classification
- Kingdom: Animalia
- Phylum: Arthropoda
- Clade: Pancrustacea
- Class: Insecta
- Order: Lepidoptera
- Family: Coleophoridae
- Genus: Coleophora
- Species: C. pseudofuscoaenea

Binomial name
- Coleophora pseudofuscoaenea Baldizzone & Stübner, 2007

Species of moth

Coleophora pseudofuscoaenea is a moth of the family Coleophoridae. It is found in Tunisia.

The length of the forewings is about 7.5 mm. Adults are on wing in May.
