= Coleophora lenae =

Scientific classification
- Kingdom: Animalia
- Phylum: Arthropoda
- Class: Insecta
- Order: Lepidoptera
- Family: Coleophoridae
- Genus: Coleophora
- Species: C. lenae

Binomial name
- Coleophora lenae Glaser, 1969

Species of moth

Coleophora lenae is a moth of the family Coleophoridae. It is found in North Macedonia.

The larvae feed on Achillea coarctata. They create a greyish brown, hairy and very variable lobe case of 9–11 mm. The mouth angle is 35-45°. Larvae can be found in early May.
