= Coleophora principiella =

Scientific classification
- Kingdom: Animalia
- Phylum: Arthropoda
- Class: Insecta
- Order: Lepidoptera
- Family: Coleophoridae
- Genus: Coleophora
- Species: C. principiella

Binomial name
- Coleophora principiella Walsingham, 1907

Species of moth

Coleophora principiella is a moth of the family Coleophoridae that is endemic to Algeria.
