= Coleophora tytri =

Scientific classification
- Kingdom: Animalia
- Phylum: Arthropoda
- Class: Insecta
- Order: Lepidoptera
- Family: Coleophoridae
- Genus: Coleophora
- Species: C. tytri

Binomial name
- Coleophora tytri Falkovitsh, 1970

Species of moth

Coleophora tytri is a moth of the family Coleophoridae. It is found in Turkestan and Uzbekistan.

The larvae feed on Salsola gemmascens. The larvae can be found from September to October.
