= Coleophora gobincola =

Scientific classification
- Kingdom: Animalia
- Phylum: Arthropoda
- Class: Insecta
- Order: Lepidoptera
- Family: Coleophoridae
- Genus: Coleophora
- Species: C. gobincola

Binomial name
- Coleophora gobincola Falkovitsh, 1982

Species of moth

Coleophora gobincola is a moth of the family Coleophoridae.
