= Coleophora guttella =

Scientific classification
- Kingdom: Animalia
- Phylum: Arthropoda
- Class: Insecta
- Order: Lepidoptera
- Family: Coleophoridae
- Genus: Coleophora
- Species: C. guttella

Binomial name
- Coleophora guttella (Reznik, 1979)

Synonyms
- Multicoloria guttella Reznik, 1979

Species of moth

Coleophora guttella is a moth of the family Coleophoridae. It is found in Turkestan and Uzbekistan.

The larvae feed on Artemisia turanica and Artemisia fragrans. They feed on the leaves of their host plant.
