= Coleophora semistrigata =

Scientific classification
- Kingdom: Animalia
- Phylum: Arthropoda
- Class: Insecta
- Order: Lepidoptera
- Family: Coleophoridae
- Genus: Coleophora
- Species: C. semistrigata

Binomial name
- Coleophora semistrigata Toll, 1952

Synonyms
- Coleophora zizarella Toll, 1957

Species of moth

Coleophora semistrigata is a moth of the family Coleophoridae. It is found in Libya, Morocco and Tunisia.
