= Coleophora intermixta =

Scientific classification
- Kingdom: Animalia
- Phylum: Arthropoda
- Class: Insecta
- Order: Lepidoptera
- Family: Coleophoridae
- Genus: Coleophora
- Species: C. intermixta

Binomial name
- Coleophora intermixta Falkovitsh, 1976

Species of moth

Coleophora intermixta is a moth of the family Coleophoridae. It is found in Mongolia.
