= Coleophora gemmiformis =

Scientific classification
- Kingdom: Animalia
- Phylum: Arthropoda
- Class: Insecta
- Order: Lepidoptera
- Family: Coleophoridae
- Genus: Coleophora
- Species: C. gemmiformis

Binomial name
- Coleophora gemmiformis H.H. Li, 2004

Species of moth

Coleophora gemmiformis is a moth of the family Coleophoridae. It is found in Tibet (Xizang Autonomous Region).
