= Coleophora judaica =

Scientific classification
- Kingdom: Animalia
- Phylum: Arthropoda
- Class: Insecta
- Order: Lepidoptera
- Family: Coleophoridae
- Genus: Coleophora
- Species: C. judaica

Binomial name
- Coleophora judaica Amsel, 1935

Species of moth

Coleophora judaica is a moth of the family Coleophoridae. It is found in the Palestinian Territories.
