= Coleophora cousiniae =

Scientific classification
- Kingdom: Animalia
- Phylum: Arthropoda
- Class: Insecta
- Order: Lepidoptera
- Family: Coleophoridae
- Genus: Coleophora
- Species: C. cousiniae

Binomial name
- Coleophora cousiniae Falkovitsh, 1988

Species of moth

Coleophora cousiniae is a moth of the family Coleophoridae.

The larvae feed on Cousinia albiflora. They feed on the leaves of their host plant.
