= Coleophora agathella =

Scientific classification
- Kingdom: Animalia
- Phylum: Arthropoda
- Class: Insecta
- Order: Lepidoptera
- Family: Coleophoridae
- Genus: Coleophora
- Species: C. agathella

Binomial name
- Coleophora agathella Petshen, 1992

Species of moth

Coleophora agathella is a moth of the family Coleophoridae that is endemic to Turkmenistan.

The larvae feed on the leaves of Acanthophyllus species.
