= Coleophora niphocrossa =

Scientific classification
- Kingdom: Animalia
- Phylum: Arthropoda
- Class: Insecta
- Order: Lepidoptera
- Family: Coleophoridae
- Genus: Coleophora
- Species: C. niphocrossa

Binomial name
- Coleophora niphocrossa Meyrick, 1920

Species of moth

Coleophora niphocrossa is a moth of the family Coleophoridae. It is found in South Africa.
