= Coleophora leucochares =

Scientific classification
- Kingdom: Animalia
- Phylum: Arthropoda
- Class: Insecta
- Order: Lepidoptera
- Family: Coleophoridae
- Genus: Coleophora
- Species: C. leucochares

Binomial name
- Coleophora leucochares Meyrick, 1922

Species of moth

Coleophora leucochares is a moth of the family Coleophoridae. It is found in north-eastern India (Assam, Shillong).
