= Coleophora innermongoliensis =

Scientific classification
- Kingdom: Animalia
- Phylum: Arthropoda
- Class: Insecta
- Order: Lepidoptera
- Family: Coleophoridae
- Genus: Coleophora
- Species: C. innermongoliensis

Binomial name
- Coleophora innermongoliensis H.H.Li, 2005

Species of moth

Coleophora innermongoliensis is a moth of the family Coleophoridae. It is found in Inner Mongolia, China.

The wingspan is 11.5–16 mm.

== Etymology ==
The specific name is derived from its type locality.
