= Coleophora calida =

Scientific classification
- Kingdom: Animalia
- Phylum: Arthropoda
- Class: Insecta
- Order: Lepidoptera
- Family: Coleophoridae
- Genus: Coleophora
- Species: C. calida

Binomial name
- Coleophora calida Falkovitsh, 1988

Species of moth

Coleophora calida is a moth of the family Coleophoridae.
