= Coleophora batangica =

Scientific classification
- Kingdom: Animalia
- Phylum: Arthropoda
- Clade: Pancrustacea
- Class: Insecta
- Order: Lepidoptera
- Family: Coleophoridae
- Genus: Coleophora
- Species: C. batangica

Binomial name
- Coleophora batangica Baldizzone, 1989

Species of moth

Coleophora batangica is a moth of the family Coleophoridae. It is endemic to Tibet, China.

The wingspan is about 13 millimetres (0.51 in). The larval host plant is unknown.
