= Coleophora cormicola =

Scientific classification
- Kingdom: Animalia
- Phylum: Arthropoda
- Class: Insecta
- Order: Lepidoptera
- Family: Coleophoridae
- Genus: Coleophora
- Species: C. cormicola

Binomial name
- Coleophora cormicola Falkovitsh, 1989

Species of moth

Coleophora cormicola is a moth of the family Coleophoridae.

The larvae feed on Caroxylon dendroides and Caroxylon orientale. They feed on the shoots of their host plant.
