= Coleophora argentifimbriata =

Scientific classification
- Kingdom: Animalia
- Phylum: Arthropoda
- Class: Insecta
- Order: Lepidoptera
- Family: Coleophoridae
- Genus: Coleophora
- Species: C. argentifimbriata

Binomial name
- Coleophora argentifimbriata Walsingham, 1907

Species of moth

Coleophora argentifimbriata is a moth of the family Coleophoridae that can be found in Algeria and Turkey.

The length of the forewings is 6.5–7.5 millimetres (0.26–0.30 in) for males and 5.5–6 millimetres (0.22–0.24 in) for females.

Larvae possibly feed on Trifolium species.
