= Coleophora haloxylonella =

Scientific classification
- Kingdom: Animalia
- Phylum: Arthropoda
- Class: Insecta
- Order: Lepidoptera
- Family: Coleophoridae
- Genus: Coleophora
- Species: C. haloxylonella

Binomial name
- Coleophora haloxylonella Chrétien, 1915

Species of moth

Coleophora haloxylonella is a moth of the family Coleophoridae. It is found in Algeria, Tunisia and Libya.

The larvae feed on Hammada articulata species. They feed on the shoots and possibly also on the fruits of their host plant.
