= Bystry, Poland =

Bystry
- Village
- Location within Poland
- Coordinates: 54°1′24″N 21°48′23″E
- Country: Poland
- Voivodeship: Warmian-Masurian
- County: Giżycko
- Gmina: Giżycko
- Population: 1,012

Bystry [ˈbɨstrɨ] is a village in the administrative district of Gmina Giżycko, within Giżycko County, Warmian-Masurian Voivodeship, in northern Poland.
