= Wola Bogaczkowska =

- Village
- Location within Poland
- Coordinates: 54°2′24″N 21°45′32″E
- Country: Poland
- Voivodeship: Warmian-Masurian
- County: Giżycko
- Gmina: Giżycko

Wola Bogaczkowska [ˈvɔla bɔɡat͡ʂˈkɔfska] is a village in the administrative district of Gmina Giżycko, within Giżycko County, Warmian-Masurian Voivodeship, in northern Poland.

== History ==
Until 1945, what is now the separate village of Wola Bogaczkowska was an estate within the municipality of Bogatzewen (Polish: Bogaczewo), located only a few hundred metres north of the village centre. Its history was therefore closely connected with that of its parent municipality. On 19 September 1927, the municipality and the village were renamed "Reichensee".

The separate history of Wola Bogaczkowska began in 1945, when the area became part of Poland as a result of the post-war territorial changes. By then, the former estate no longer existed. The village remains administratively connected with the former parent municipality through its membership in its sołectwo (village administrative unit).

Wola Bogaczkowska is now part of Gmina Giżycko, in Giżycko County (Polish: Powiat Giżycki). From 1975 to 1998, it belonged to Suwałki Voivodeship, and since 1999 it has been part of the Warmian–Masurian Voivodeship.
