= Kap =

Kap or KAP may refer to:

== People ==
- K. Appavu Pillai (1911–1973), Indian politician
- Colin Kaepernick (born 1987), American football player
- Gabe Kapler (born 1975), American baseball player

== Places ==
- Kąp, Gmina Giżycko, Poland
- Kąp, Gmina Miłki, Poland

== Organizations ==
- Communist Workers Party (Denmark) (Danish: Kommunistisk Arbejderparti)
- Katipunan ng mga Anak-Pawis sa Pilipinas, a trade union in the Philippines
- Katter's Australian Party
- Kink Aware Professionals, a program run by the National Coalition for Sexual Freedom
- Kiribati Adaptation Program
- Aluminium Plant Podgorica, Montenegro

== Transport ==
- Kalianpur railway station, Uttar Pradesh, India (Indian Railways station code)
- King Albert Park MRT station, Singapore (MRT station abbreviation)

== Other ==
- Kap language
- Kap (poetry) (Thai: กาพย์), a form of Thai poetry
- Ketamine-assisted psychotherapy
- Kite aerial photography
- Kent Access Permit, for lorries entering Kent, England
