= Rydze =

- Settlement
- Location within Poland
- Coordinates: 53°57′46″N 22°01′15″E
- Country: Poland
- Voivodeship: Warmian-Masurian
- County: Giżycko
- Gmina: Wydminy
- Village: Siemionki
- Time zone: UTC+1 (CET)
  - Summer (DST): UTC+2 (CEST)
- Vehicle registration: NGI

Rydze [ˈrɨd͡zɛ] is a settlement, part of the village of Siemionki, in the administrative district of Gmina Wydminy, within Giżycko County, Warmian-Masurian Voivodeship, in north-eastern Poland. It is located in the region of Masuria.
