= Miechy =

- Village
- Location within Poland
- Coordinates: 53°57′N 21°55′E
- Country: Poland
- Voivodeship: Warmian-Masurian
- County: Giżycko
- Gmina: Miłki

Miechy [ˈmjɛxɨ] is a village in the administrative district of Gmina Miłki, within Giżycko County, Warmian-Masurian Voivodeship, in northern Poland.
