= Skomack Mały =

- Village
- Location within Poland
- Coordinates: 53°53′N 21°59′E
- Country: Poland
- Voivodeship: Warmian-Masurian
- County: Giżycko
- Gmina: Wydminy

Skomack Mały [ˈskɔmat͡sk ˈmawɨ] is a village in the administrative district of Gmina Wydminy, within Giżycko County, Warmian-Masurian Voivodeship, in northern Poland.
