= Tros, Poland =

Tros
- Village
- Location within Poland
- Coordinates: 53°57′N 21°38′E
- Country: Poland
- Voivodeship: Warmian-Masurian
- County: Giżycko
- Gmina: Ryn

Tros [trɔs] is a village in the administrative district of Gmina Ryn, within Giżycko County, Warmian-Masurian Voivodeship, in northern Poland.
