= Orłowo, Giżycko County =

Orłowo
- Village
- Location within Poland
- Coordinates: 54°3′N 22°9′E
- Country: Poland
- Voivodeship: Warmian-Masurian
- County: Giżycko
- Gmina: Wydminy

Orłowo [ɔrˈwɔvɔ] is a village in the administrative district of Gmina Wydminy, within Giżycko County, Warmian-Masurian Voivodeship, in northern Poland.
