= Orło, Warmian-Masurian Voivodeship =

Orło
- Village
- Location within Poland
- Coordinates: 53°59′N 21°35′E
- Country: Poland
- Voivodeship: Warmian-Masurian
- County: Giżycko
- Gmina: Ryn

Orło [ˈɔrwɔ] is a village in the administrative district of Gmina Ryn, within Giżycko County, Warmian-Masurian Voivodeship, in northern Poland.
