= Pierkunowo =

- Village
- Location within Poland
- Coordinates: 54°4′20″N 21°43′50″E
- Country: Poland
- Voivodeship: Warmian-Masurian
- County: Giżycko
- Gmina: Giżycko
- Population: 210

Pierkunowo [pjɛrkuˈnɔvɔ] is a village in the administrative district of Gmina Giżycko, within Giżycko County, Warmian-Masurian Voivodeship, in northern Poland.
