= Zielony Gaj =

Zielony Gaj may refer to the following places:

- Zielony Gaj, Sokółka County in Podlaskie Voivodeship (north-east Poland)
- Zielony Gaj, Giżycko County in Warmian-Masurian Voivodeship (north Poland)
