= Szczybały Orłowskie =

- Village
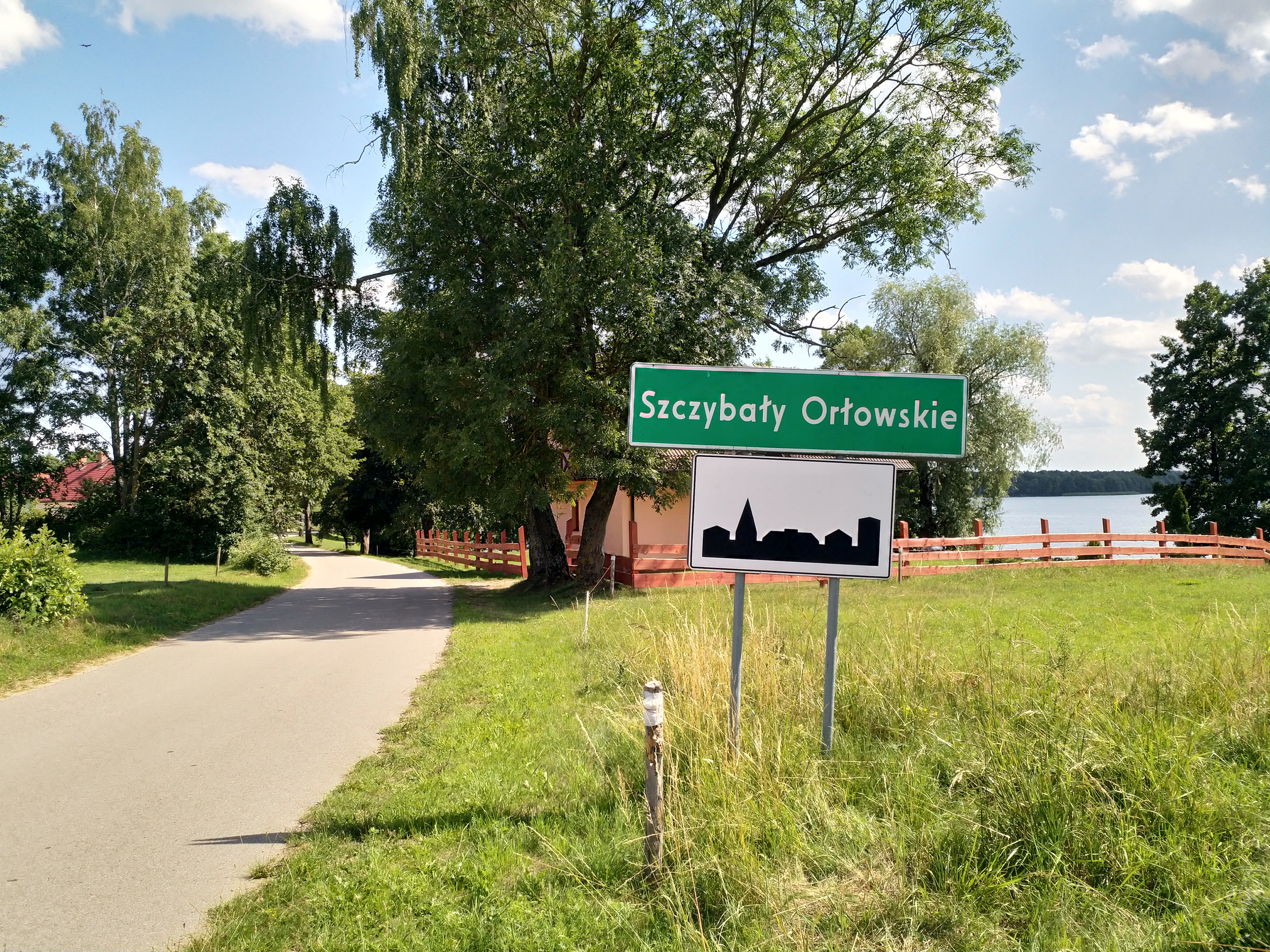
- (2023)

- Location within Poland
- Coordinates: 54°3′N 22°8′E
- Country: Poland
- Voivodeship: Warmian-Masurian
- County: Giżycko
- Gmina: Wydminy

Szczybały Orłowskie [ʂt͡ʂɨˈbawɨ ɔrˈwɔfskʲɛ] is a village in the administrative district of Gmina Wydminy, within Giżycko County, Warmian-Masurian Voivodeship, in northern Poland.
