= Monetki =

- Village
- Location within Poland
- Coordinates: 53°57′N 21°40′E
- Country: Poland
- Voivodeship: Warmian-Masurian
- County: Giżycko
- Gmina: Ryn
- Population: 360

Monetki [mɔˈnɛtki] is a village in the administrative district of Gmina Ryn, within Giżycko County, Warmian-Masurian Voivodeship, in northern Poland.
