= Kleszczewo-Osada =

- Settlement
- Location within Poland
- Coordinates: 53°58′33″N 21°48′32″E
- Country: Poland
- Voivodeship: Warmian-Masurian
- County: Giżycko
- Gmina: Miłki

Kleszczewo-Osada [klɛʂˈt͡ʂɛvɔ ɔˈsada] is a settlement in the administrative district of Gmina Miłki, within Giżycko County, Warmian-Masurian Voivodeship, in northern Poland.

The settlement did not exist before 1945 and can be translated as Kleszczewo-settlement or Brassendorf-Siedlung.
