= Marcinowa Wola =

- Village
- Location within Poland
- Coordinates: 53°55′N 21°51′E
- Country: Poland
- Voivodeship: Warmian-Masurian
- County: Giżycko
- Gmina: Miłki
- Population: 275
- Website: http://www.marcinowawola.pl

Marcinowa Wola [mart͡ɕiˈnɔva ˈvɔla] is a village in the administrative district of Gmina Miłki, within Giżycko County, Warmian-Masurian Voivodeship, in northern Poland.
