= Wólka Cybulska =

- Settlement
- Location within Poland
- Coordinates: 53°57′10″N 22°03′19″E
- Country: Poland
- Voivodeship: Warmian-Masurian
- County: Giżycko
- Gmina: Wydminy

Wólka Cybulska [ˈvulka t͡sɨˈbulska] is a settlement in the administrative district of Gmina Wydminy, within Giżycko County, Warmian-Masurian Voivodeship, in northern Poland.
