= Okrągłe =

Okrągłe may refer to the following places:

- Okrągłe, Lublin Voivodeship (east Poland)
- Okrągłe, Podlaskie Voivodeship (north-east Poland)
- Okrągłe, Silesian Voivodeship (south Poland)
- Okrągłe, Giżycko County in Warmian-Masurian Voivodeship (north Poland)
- Okrągłe, Ostróda County in Warmian-Masurian Voivodeship (north Poland)
