= Sołdany =

- Village
- Location within Poland
- Coordinates: 54°5′N 21°52′E
- Country: Poland
- Voivodeship: Warmian-Masurian
- County: Giżycko
- Gmina: Giżycko

Sołdany [sɔu̯ˈdanɨ] is a village in the administrative district of Gmina Giżycko, within Giżycko County, Warmian-Masurian Voivodeship, in northern Poland.
