= Hejbuty =

- Village
- Location within Poland
- Coordinates: 53°54′11″N 22°4′32″E
- Country: Poland
- Voivodeship: Warmian-Masurian
- County: Giżycko
- Gmina: Wydminy

Hejbuty [xɛi̯ˈbutɨ] is a village in the administrative district of Gmina Wydminy, within Giżycko County, Warmian-Masurian Voivodeship, in northern Poland.
