= Günter Lyhs =

German gymnast (1934–2025)

- Born: 20 April 1934 Sulimmen, Gau East Prussia, Nazi Germany
- Died: 17 December 2025 (aged 91) Kierspe, North Rhine-Westphalia, Germany
- Height: 1.60 m (5 ft 3 in)

Gymnastics career
- Discipline: Men's artistic gymnastics
- Country represented: West Germany
- Gym: Turnverein Jahn Kierspe 1904
Medal record
Men's artistic gymnastics
Representing Germany
Olympic Games
Bronze medal – third place	1964 Tokyo	Team

Günter Lyhs (20 April 1934 – 17 December 2025) was a German gymnast. He competed at the 1960 and 1964 Summer Olympics in all artistic gymnastics events and finished in seventh and third place, with the German team, respectively. Individually, his best achievement was 16th place on the vault in 1964.

Lyhs died on 17 December 2025, at the age of 91.
