= Siejba =

- Settlement
- Location within Poland
- Coordinates: 53°59′31″N 22°06′53″E
- Country: Poland
- Voivodeship: Warmian-Masurian
- County: Giżycko
- Gmina: Wydminy

Siejba [ˈɕɛi̯ba] is a settlement in the administrative district of Gmina Wydminy, within Giżycko County, Warmian-Masurian Voivodeship, in northern Poland.
