= Bogaczewo =

Bogaczewo may refer to the following places:

- Bogaczewo, Elbląg County in Warmian-Masurian Voivodeship (north Poland)
- Bogaczewo, Giżycko County in Warmian-Masurian Voivodeship (north Poland)
- Bogaczewo, Ostróda County in Warmian-Masurian Voivodeship (north Poland)
