= Rostki =

Rostki may refer to the following places:

- Rostki (Ostrołęka County) in Masovian Voivodeship (east-central Poland)
- Rostki, Kolno County in Podlaskie Voivodeship (north-east Poland)
- Rostki, Łomża County in Podlaskie Voivodeship (north-east Poland)
- Rostki, Maków County in Masovian Voivodeship (east-central Poland)
- Rostki, Płońsk County in Masovian Voivodeship (east-central Poland)
- Rostki, Węgrów County in Masovian Voivodeship (east-central Poland)
- Rostki, Giżycko County in Warmian-Masurian Voivodeship (north Poland)
- Rostki, Pisz County in Warmian-Masurian Voivodeship (north Poland)
