= Wyszowate, Warmian-Masurian Voivodeship =

Wyszowate
- Village
- Location within Poland
- Coordinates: 53°56′N 21°53′E
- Country: Poland
- Voivodeship: Warmian-Masurian
- County: Giżycko
- Gmina: Miłki
- Time zone: UTC+1 (CET)
  - Summer (DST): UTC+2 (CEST)
- Vehicle registration: NGI

Wyszowate [vɨʂɔˈvatɛ] is a village in the administrative district of Gmina Miłki, within Giżycko County, Warmian-Masurian Voivodeship, in northern Poland.

It is situated on the northern shores of Ublik Wielki Lake in the historic region of Masuria.

== History ==
In 1475 the Teutonic Order commander of Brandenburg Bernard von Balzhofen granted land to Polish noble settlers coming from the Duchy of Masovia in return for their military service. The biggest part (8 włókas)) was given to Michał Wysowaty who founded the village of Wyszowate. It formed a part of the Kingdom of Poland as a fief, then from the 18th century, it was part of the Kingdom of Prussia, and from 1871 to 1945 it was also part of Germany, within which it was located in the province of East Prussia.
