= Róg Orłowski =

- Settlement
- Location within Poland
- Coordinates: 54°03′50″N 22°07′40″E
- Country: Poland
- Voivodeship: Warmian-Masurian
- County: Giżycko
- Gmina: Wydminy

Róg Orłowski [ˈruk ɔrˈwɔfski] is a settlement in the administrative district of Gmina Wydminy, within Giżycko County, Warmian-Masurian Voivodeship, in northern Poland.
