= Bogacko =

- Village
- Location within Poland
- Coordinates: 54°3′N 21°39′E
- Country: Poland
- Voivodeship: Warmian-Masurian
- County: Giżycko
- Gmina: Giżycko

Bogacko [bɔˈɡat͡skɔ] is a village in the administrative district of Gmina Giżycko, within Giżycko County, Warmian-Masurian Voivodeship, in northern Poland.
