= Kowalewskie =

- Settlement
- Location within Poland
- Coordinates: 54°2′N 22°8′E
- Country: Poland
- Voivodeship: Warmian-Masurian
- County: Giżycko
- Gmina: Wydminy

Kowalewskie [kɔvaˈlɛfskʲɛ] is a settlement in the administrative district of Gmina Wydminy, within Giżycko County, Warmian-Masurian Voivodeship, in northern Poland.
