= Upałty Małe =

- Village
- Location within Poland
- Coordinates: 54°0′54″N 21°53′26″E
- Country: Poland
- Voivodeship: Warmian-Masurian
- County: Giżycko
- Gmina: Giżycko
- Population: 200

Upałty Małe [uˈpau̯tɨ ˈmawɛ] is a village in the administrative district of Gmina Giżycko, within Giżycko County, Warmian-Masurian Voivodeship, in northern Poland.
