= Knis-Podewsie =

- Settlement
- Location within Poland
- Coordinates: 53°58′4″N 21°29′39″E
- Country: Poland
- Voivodeship: Warmian-Masurian
- County: Giżycko
- Gmina: Ryn

Knis-Podewsie [ˈknis pɔˈdɛfɕɛ] is a settlement in the administrative district of Gmina Ryn, within Giżycko County, Warmian-Masurian Voivodeship, in northern Poland.
