= Kożuchy Małe, Giżycko County =

Kożuchy Małe
- Village
- Location within Poland
- Coordinates: 54°2′34″N 21°53′18″E
- Country: Poland
- Voivodeship: Warmian-Masurian
- County: Giżycko
- Gmina: Giżycko
- Population: 50

Kożuchy Małe [kɔˈʐuxɨ ˈmawɛ] is a village in the administrative district of Gmina Giżycko, within Giżycko County, Warmian-Masurian Voivodeship, in northern Poland.
