= Kamionki, Giżycko County =

Village in Giżycko County, Warmian-Masurian Voivodeship, Poland

Kamionki
- Village
- Location within Poland
- Coordinates: 54°4′N 21°39′E
- Country: Poland
- Voivodeship: Warmian-Masurian
- County: Giżycko
- Gmina: Giżycko

Kamionki [kaˈmjɔnki] is a village in the administrative district of Gmina Giżycko, within Giżycko County, Warmian-Masurian Voivodeship, in northern Poland. Total Residents - 193, male Population: 107 residents (55.4%) while female Population: 86 residents (44.6%)
