= Sterławki Średnie =

- Village
- Location within Poland
- Coordinates: 54°00′35″N 21°36′46″E
- Country: Poland
- Voivodeship: Warmian-Masurian
- County: Giżycko
- Gmina: Giżycko

Sterławki Średnie [stɛrˈwafki ˈɕrɛdɲɛ] is a village in the administrative district of Gmina Giżycko, within Giżycko County, Warmian-Masurian Voivodeship, in northern Poland.

The village did not exist before 1945. Translated it would be "Mittel Stürlack" or "Middle Średnie".
