= Świdry, Giżycko County =

Świdry
- Village
- Location within Poland
- Coordinates: 54°6′N 21°47′E
- Country: Poland
- Voivodeship: Warmian-Masurian
- County: Giżycko
- Gmina: Giżycko

Świdry (Polish: [ˈɕfidrɨ]; German: Schwiddern) is a village in the administrative district of Gmina Giżycko, within Giżycko County, Warmian-Masurian Voivodeship, in northern Poland.
