= Krzywe, Giżycko County =

Krzywe
- Village
- Location within Poland
- Coordinates: 53°53′48″N 22°6′33″E
- Country: Poland
- Voivodeship: Warmian-Masurian
- County: Giżycko
- Gmina: Wydminy
- Population: 20

Krzywe [ˈkʂɨvɛ] is a village in the administrative district of Gmina Wydminy, within Giżycko County, Warmian-Masurian Voivodeship, in northern Poland.
