= Dziewiszewo =

- Village
- Location within Poland
- Coordinates: 54°4′2″N 21°36′48″E
- Country: Poland
- Voivodeship: Warmian-Masurian
- County: Giżycko
- Gmina: Giżycko
- Population: 20

Dziewiszewo [d͡ʑɛviˈʂɛvɔ] is a village in the administrative district of Gmina Giżycko, within Giżycko County, Warmian-Masurian Voivodeship, in northern Poland.
