= Wężówka =

- Village
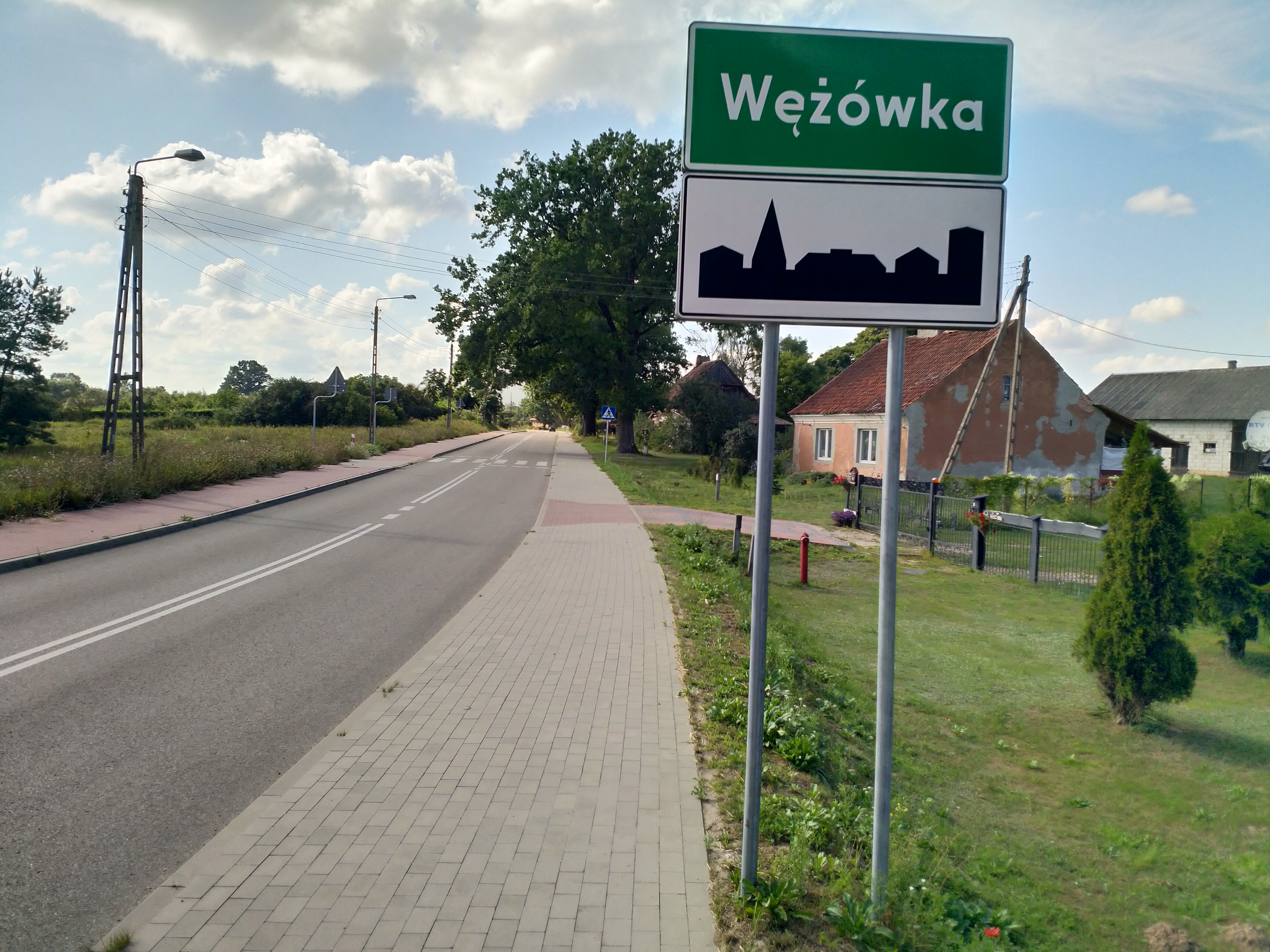

- Location within Poland
- Coordinates: 53°58′N 22°5′E
- Country: Poland
- Voivodeship: Warmian-Masurian
- County: Giżycko
- Gmina: Wydminy

Wężówka [vɛ̃ˈʐufka] is a village in the administrative district of Gmina Wydminy, within Giżycko County, Warmian-Masurian Voivodeship, in northern Poland.
