= Siejkowo =

- Settlement
- Location within Poland
- Coordinates: 53°54′36″N 21°33′29″E
- Country: Poland
- Voivodeship: Warmian-Masurian
- County: Giżycko
- Gmina: Ryn

Siejkowo [ɕɛi̯ˈkɔvɔ] is a settlement in the administrative district of Gmina Ryn, within Giżycko County, Warmian-Masurian Voivodeship, in northern Poland.
