= Hermanowa Wola =

- Settlement
- Location within Poland
- Coordinates: 53°55′51″N 21°34′45″E
- Country: Poland
- Voivodeship: Warmian-Masurian
- County: Giżycko
- Gmina: Ryn
- Population: 10

Hermanowa Wola [xɛrmaˈnɔva ˈvɔla] is a settlement in the administrative district of Gmina Ryn, within Giżycko County, Warmian-Masurian Voivodeship, in northern Poland.
