= Guty =

Guty may refer to the following villages:

- Guty (Třinec) in the Czech Republic
- Guty, Legionowo County in Masovian Voivodeship (east-central Poland)
- Guty, Podlaskie Voivodeship (north-east Poland)
- Guty, Sokołów County in Masovian Voivodeship (east-central Poland)
- Guty, Giżycko County in Warmian-Masurian Voivodeship (north Poland)
- Guty, Olecko County in Warmian-Masurian Voivodeship (north Poland)
