= Mleczkowo, Warmian-Masurian Voivodeship =

Mleczkowo
- Settlement
- Location within Poland
- Coordinates: 53°57′18″N 21°32′14″E
- Country: Poland
- Voivodeship: Warmian-Masurian
- County: Giżycko
- Gmina: Ryn

Mleczkowo [mlɛt͡ʂˈkɔvɔ] is a settlement in the administrative district of Gmina Ryn, within Giżycko County, Warmian-Masurian Voivodeship, in northern Poland.
