= Kąp, Gmina Miłki =

Kąp
- Settlement
- Location within Poland
- Coordinates: 53°59′26″N 21°50′07″E
- Country: Poland
- Voivodeship: Warmian-Masurian
- County: Giżycko
- Gmina: Miłki
- Time zone: UTC+1 (CET)
  - Summer (DST): UTC+2 (CEST)
- Vehicle registration: NGI

Kąp [kɔmp] is a settlement, part of the village of Ruda in the administrative district of Gmina Miłki, within Giżycko County, Warmian-Masurian Voivodeship, in north-eastern Poland. It is located in the historic region of Masuria.

== History ==
=== After Second World War ===
The settlement most likely was founded after 1945.

=== 1975-1998 ===
In the years 1975–1998, Kąp was a part of the Suwałki Voivodeship.
