= Jagodne Małe =

- Village
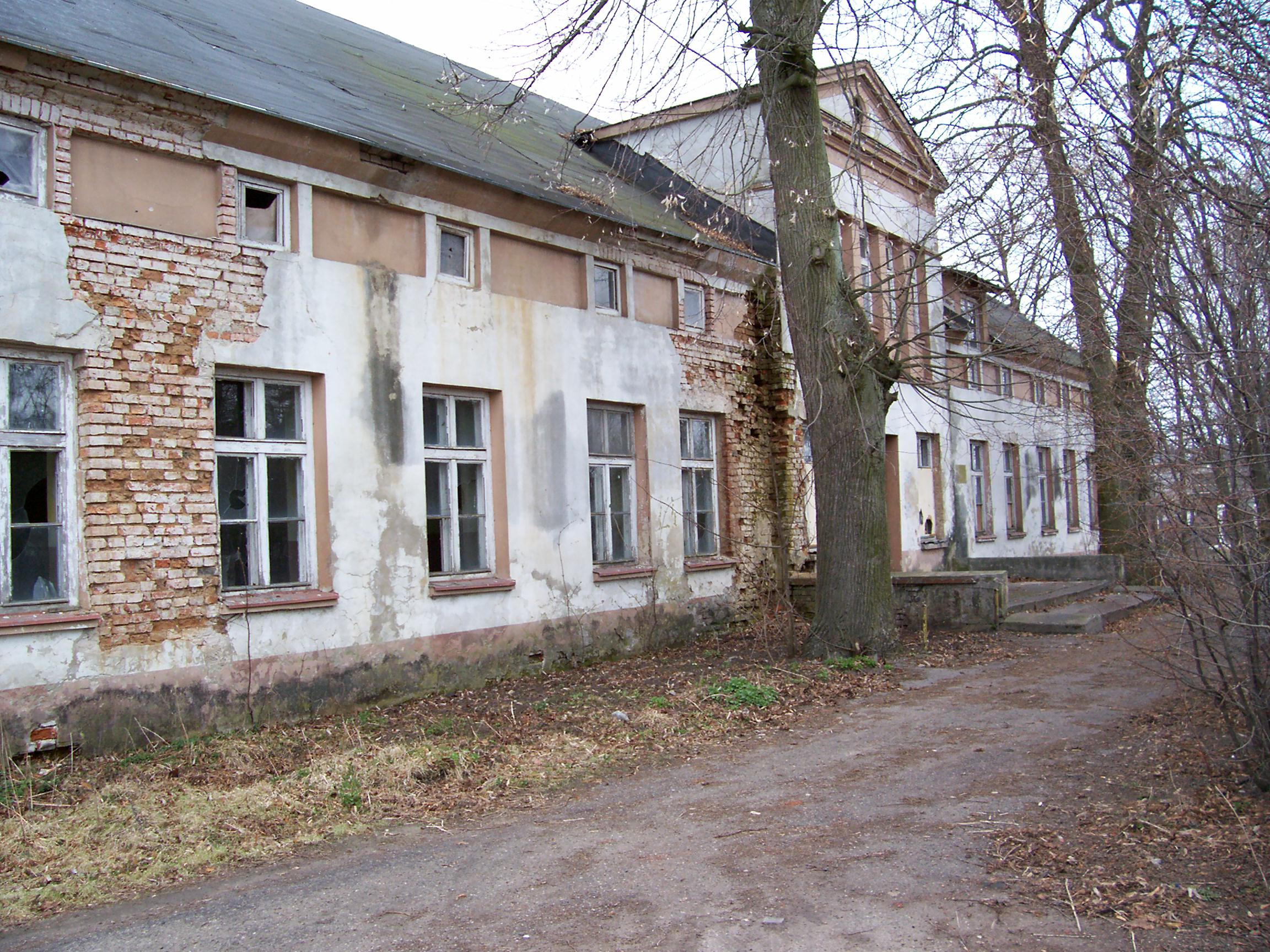

- Location within Poland
- Coordinates: 53°54′57″N 21°42′50″E
- Country: Poland
- Voivodeship: Warmian-Masurian
- County: Giżycko
- Gmina: Miłki

Jagodne Małe [jaˈɡɔdnɛ ˈmawɛ] is a village in the administrative district of Gmina Miłki, within Giżycko County, Warmian-Masurian Voivodeship, in northern Poland.
