= Strzelce, Warmian-Masurian Voivodeship =

Strzelce
- Village
- Location within Poland
- Coordinates: 53°59′14″N 21°45′43″E
- Country: Poland
- Voivodeship: Warmian-Masurian
- County: Giżycko
- Gmina: Giżycko

Strzelce [ˈstʂɛlt͡sɛ] is a village in the administrative district of Gmina Giżycko, within Giżycko County, Warmian-Masurian Voivodeship, in northern Poland.
