= Malinka =

- Village
- Location within Poland
- Coordinates: 53°56′16″N 21°58′01″E
- Country: Poland
- Voivodeship: Warmian-Masurian
- County: Giżycko
- Gmina: Wydminy

Malinka [maˈlinka] is a village in the administrative district of Gmina Wydminy, within Giżycko County, Warmian-Masurian Voivodeship, in northern Poland.
