= Biała Giżycka =

- Village
- Location within Poland
- Coordinates: 53°53′10″N 22°1′24″E
- Country: Poland
- Voivodeship: Warmian-Masurian
- County: Giżycko
- Gmina: Wydminy
- Population: 70

Biała Giżycka [ˈbjawa ɡiˈʐɨt͡ska] (German: Adlig Bialla; 1938-45: Bleichenau) is a village in the administrative district of Gmina Wydminy, within Giżycko County, Warmian-Masurian Voivodeship, in northern Poland.
