= Sucholaski =

- Village
- Location within Poland
- Coordinates: 54°1′N 21°59′E
- Country: Poland
- Voivodeship: Warmian-Masurian
- County: Giżycko
- Gmina: Wydminy

Sucholaski [suxɔˈlaski] is a village in the administrative district of Gmina Wydminy, within Giżycko County, Warmian-Masurian Voivodeship, in northern Poland.
