= Wronka, Warmian-Masurian Voivodeship =

Wronka
- Village
- Location within Poland
- Coordinates: 54°1′N 21°42′E
- Country: Poland
- Voivodeship: Warmian-Masurian
- County: Giżycko
- Gmina: Giżycko

Wronka [ˈvrɔnka] is a village in the administrative district of Gmina Giżycko, within Giżycko County, Warmian-Masurian Voivodeship, in northern Poland.
