= Franciszkowo, Giżycko County =

Franciszkowo
- Settlement
- Location within Poland
- Coordinates: 53°53′40″N 22°2′54″E
- Country: Poland
- Voivodeship: Warmian-Masurian
- County: Giżycko
- Gmina: Wydminy

Franciszkowo [frant͡ɕiʂˈkɔvɔ] (German: Franziskowen) is a settlement in the administrative district of Gmina Wydminy, within Giżycko County, Warmian-Masurian Voivodeship, in northern Poland.
