= Bachorza, Warmian-Masurian Voivodeship =

Settlement in Poland

Bachorza
- Settlement
- Location within Poland
- Coordinates: 53°56′51″N 21°35′41″E
- Country: Poland
- Voivodeship: Warmian-Masurian
- County: Giżycko
- Gmina: Ryn
- Time zone: UTC+1 (CET)
  - Summer (DST): UTC+2 (CEST)
- Vehicle registration: NGI

Bachorza [baˈxɔʐa] is a settlement in the administrative district of Gmina Ryn, within Giżycko County, Warmian-Masurian Voivodeship, in north-eastern Poland.
