= Gajewo, Warmian-Masurian Voivodeship =

Gajewo
- Village
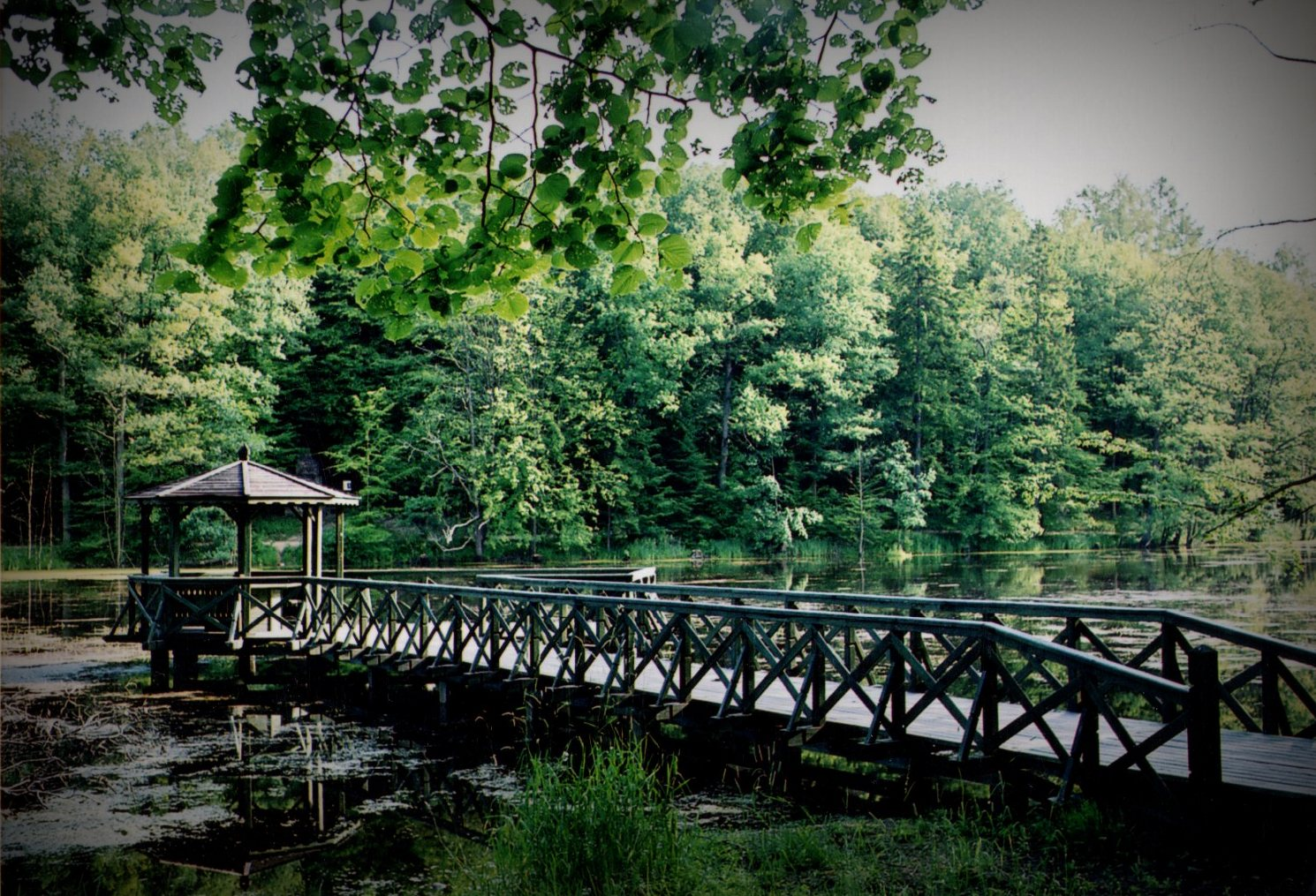

- Location within Poland
- Coordinates: 54°05′08″N 21°46′26″E
- Country: Poland
- Voivodeship: Warmian-Masurian
- County: Giżycko
- Gmina: Giżycko

Gajewo [ɡaˈjɛvɔ] is a village in the administrative district of Gmina Giżycko, within Giżycko County, Warmian-Masurian Voivodeship, in northern Poland.
