= Łękuk Mały =

- Village
- Location within Poland
- Coordinates: 54°3′10″N 22°9′3″E
- Country: Poland
- Voivodeship: Warmian-Masurian
- County: Giżycko
- Gmina: Wydminy
- Population: 100

Łękuk Mały [ˈwɛnkuk ˈmawɨ] is a village in the administrative district of Gmina Wydminy, within Giżycko County, Warmian-Masurian Voivodeship, in northern Poland.

Nearby there is a lake called Lake Łękuckie or Lake Łękuk. The lake is used for a special fishing ground. Names for Lake Łękuckie that were found in documents: Langkuck (1595), Lunkucken (1340), Grosser Lenkuk See (1928, 1940), Wielki Łękuk (1870), and Duży Łęku – a lake east of the village of Żabinki.

== History ==
Łękuk Mały (older name Mały Lenkuk, German: Klein Lenkuk) was founded on July 2, 1707, as part of the settlement. It was then that Wilhelmow Fleiszer purchased a forest settlement, the size of which was estimated at 3 włókas and 4 morga. The owner was to pay 10 marks of rent per year for the plot of land (vłóka). The colonization were strenuous since in 1714 the town was only half built up and an application was made for exemption from the established fees for the next few years in order to completely develop the area.

Names for Łękuk Mały that were found in documents: Klein Lenkuk (1945), Lękuk (1946), Łękuk (1947), Łękuk Wielki (1951), Gross Lenkuk (1699), Lenkuk, former manor, now a hamlet in the commune, and Kruklanki.

Around 1891, a palace was built in the town, which survived two fires.

Currently, there is an agritourism farm and a hotel.

=== Manor house ===
The manor house in Łękuk was built in 1707 by Wilhelm Fleiszer. In 1708, the farm experienced one of the heaviest winters in the modern period. In 1709, cases of plague infection were recorded.
