= Zielony Lasek =

- Settlement
- Location within Poland
- Coordinates: 53°52′33″N 21°35′51″E
- Country: Poland
- Voivodeship: Warmian-Masurian
- County: Giżycko
- Gmina: Ryn

Zielony Lasek (Polish: [ʑɛˈlɔnɨ ˈlasɛk]) is a settlement in the administrative district of Gmina Ryn, within Giżycko County, Warmian-Masurian Voivodeship, in northern Poland.
