= Ernstowo =

- Village
- Location within Poland
- Coordinates: 53°59′30″N 21°59′58″E
- Country: Poland
- Voivodeship: Warmian-Masurian
- County: Giżycko
- Gmina: Wydminy

Ernstowo [ɛrnsˈtɔvɔ] (German: Ernstfelde) is a village in the administrative district of Gmina Wydminy, within Giżycko County, Warmian-Masurian Voivodeship, in northern Poland.
