= Borki, Gmina Miłki =

Borki
- Settlement
- Location within Poland
- Coordinates: 53°53′45″N 21°44′29″E
- Country: Poland
- Voivodeship: Warmian-Masurian
- County: Giżycko
- Gmina: Miłki
- Population: 10

Borki [ˈbɔrki] is a settlement in the administrative district of Gmina Miłki, within Giżycko County, Warmian-Masurian Voivodeship, in northern Poland.
