= Rybical =

Ribical
- Village
- Location within Poland
- Coordinates: 53°55′N 21°32′E
- Country: Poland
- Voivodeship: Warmian-Masurian
- County: Giżycko
- Gmina: Ryn

Rybical [rɨˈbit͡sal] is a village in the administrative district of Gmina Ryn, within Giżycko County, Warmian-Masurian Voivodeship, in northern Poland.
