= Pańska Wola =

- Village
- Location within Poland
- Coordinates: 53°53′N 22°4′E
- Country: Poland
- Voivodeship: Warmian-Masurian
- County: Giżycko
- Gmina: Wydminy

Pańska Wola (Polish pronunciation: [ˈpaj̃ska ˈvɔla]) is a village in the administrative district of Gmina Wydminy, within Giżycko County, Warmian-Masurian Voivodeship, in northern Poland.
