= Bielskie =

- Village
- Location within Poland
- Coordinates: 53°53′N 21°58′E
- Country: Poland
- Voivodeship: Warmian-Masurian
- County: Giżycko
- Gmina: Miłki

Bielskie [ˈbjɛlskʲɛ] is a village in the administrative district of Gmina Miłki, within Giżycko County, Warmian-Masurian Voivodeship, in northern Poland.
