= Zbigniew Morsztyn =

Polish poet

Morsztyn's coat of arms

Zbigniew Morsztyn (Morstin, Morstyn) (ca. 1628 – December 13, 1689) was a Polish poet.

Morsztyn was born in Kraków. For nine years (1648–1657) he served in the army, and fought against the Swedes and Russians during the Northern Wars. His most celebrated work was religious poetry, contrasting with the style of his cousin, Jan Andrzej Morsztyn.

Morsztyn was a member of a Christian sect called the Polish Brethren, which existed from 1562 to 1658. Due to religious persecution in Poland Morsztyn fled in 1662 to the Duchy of Prussia (since 1618 in personal union with the Margraviate of Brandenburg) where he became a Ducal Councillor of Frederick William, Elector of Brandenburg. With the help of Radziwill he leased Stara Rudówka (Rudowken) In 1669 Morsztyn became an administrator of the estates owned by the duchess Ludwika Karolina Radziwiłł. He died in Königsberg in 1689, and was buried in Stara Rudówka the following year.
