= Grądzkie, Warmian-Masurian Voivodeship =

Grądzkie
- Village
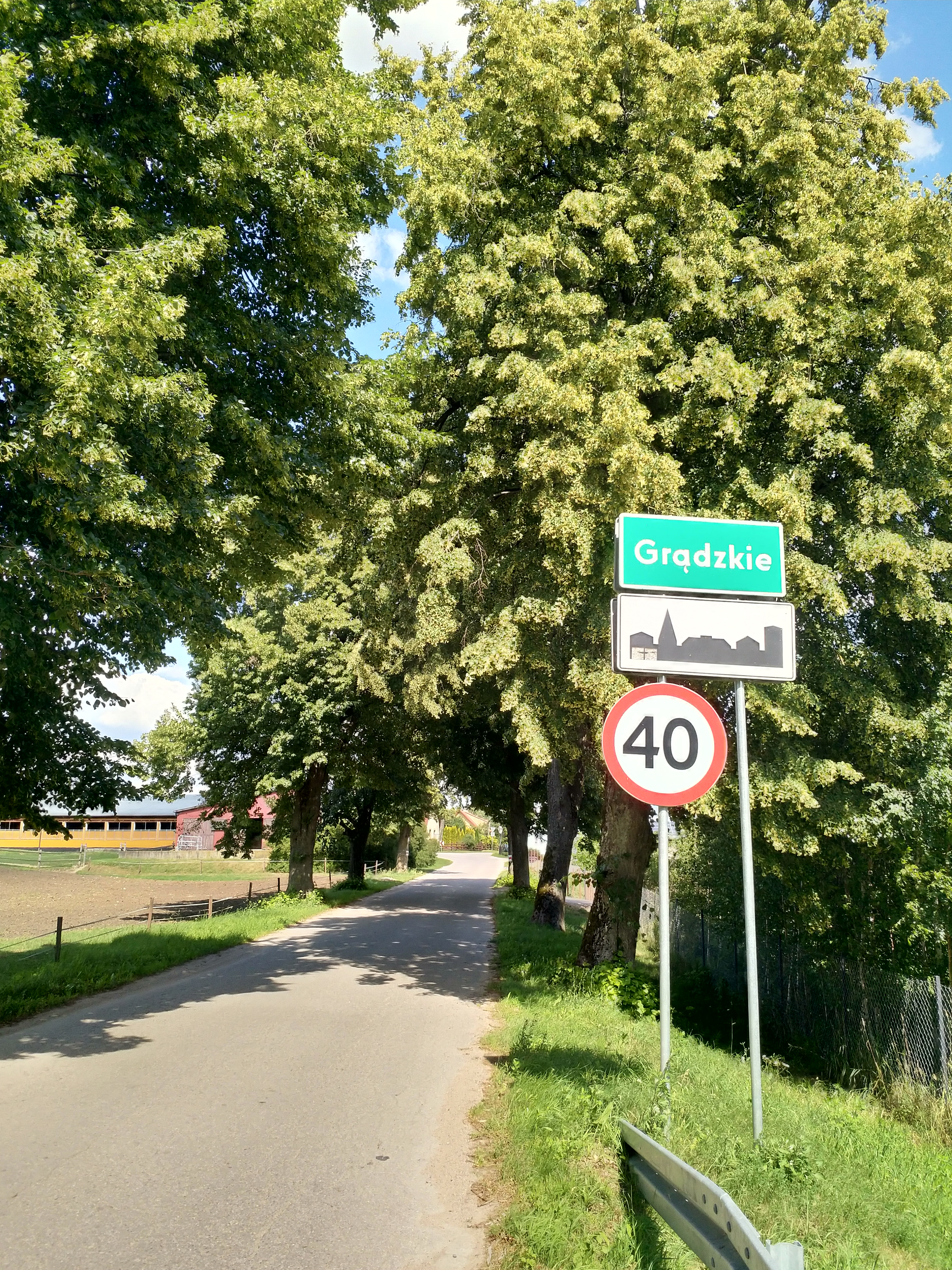
- (2023)

- Location within Poland
- Coordinates: 54°2′N 22°7′E
- Country: Poland
- Voivodeship: Warmian-Masurian
- County: Giżycko
- Gmina: Wydminy

Grądzkie [ˈɡrɔnt͡skʲɛ] is a village in the administrative district of Gmina Wydminy, within Giżycko County, Warmian-Masurian Voivodeship, in northern Poland.
