= Gorazdowo, Warmian-Masurian Voivodeship =

Gorazdowo
- Village
- Location within Poland
- Coordinates: 53°58′23″N 21°42′23″E
- Country: Poland
- Voivodeship: Warmian-Masurian
- County: Giżycko
- Gmina: Giżycko
- Population: 110

Gorazdowo [ɡɔrazˈdɔvɔ] is a village in the administrative district of Gmina Giżycko, within Giżycko County, Warmian-Masurian Voivodeship, in northern Poland.
