= Danowo =

Danowo may refer to the following places:

- Danowo, Gmina Rajgród in Podlaskie Voivodeship (north-east Poland)
- Danowo, Gmina Szczuczyn in Podlaskie Voivodeship (north-east Poland)
- Danowo, Kolno County in Podlaskie Voivodeship (north-east Poland)
- Danowo, Giżycko County in Warmian-Masurian Voivodeship (north Poland)
- Danowo, Pisz County in Warmian-Masurian Voivodeship (north Poland)
- Danowo, West Pomeranian Voivodeship (north-west Poland)
