= Gawliki Małe =

- Village
- Location within Poland
- Coordinates: 53°57′56″N 22°5′31″E
- Country: Poland
- Voivodeship: Warmian-Masurian
- County: Giżycko
- Gmina: Wydminy
- Population: 130

Gawliki Małe (pronounced [ɡaˈvliki ˈmawɛ]) is a village in the administrative district of Gmina Wydminy, within Giżycko County, Warmian-Masurian Voivodeship, in northern Poland.
