= Wilkasy, Giżycko County =

Wilkasy
- Village
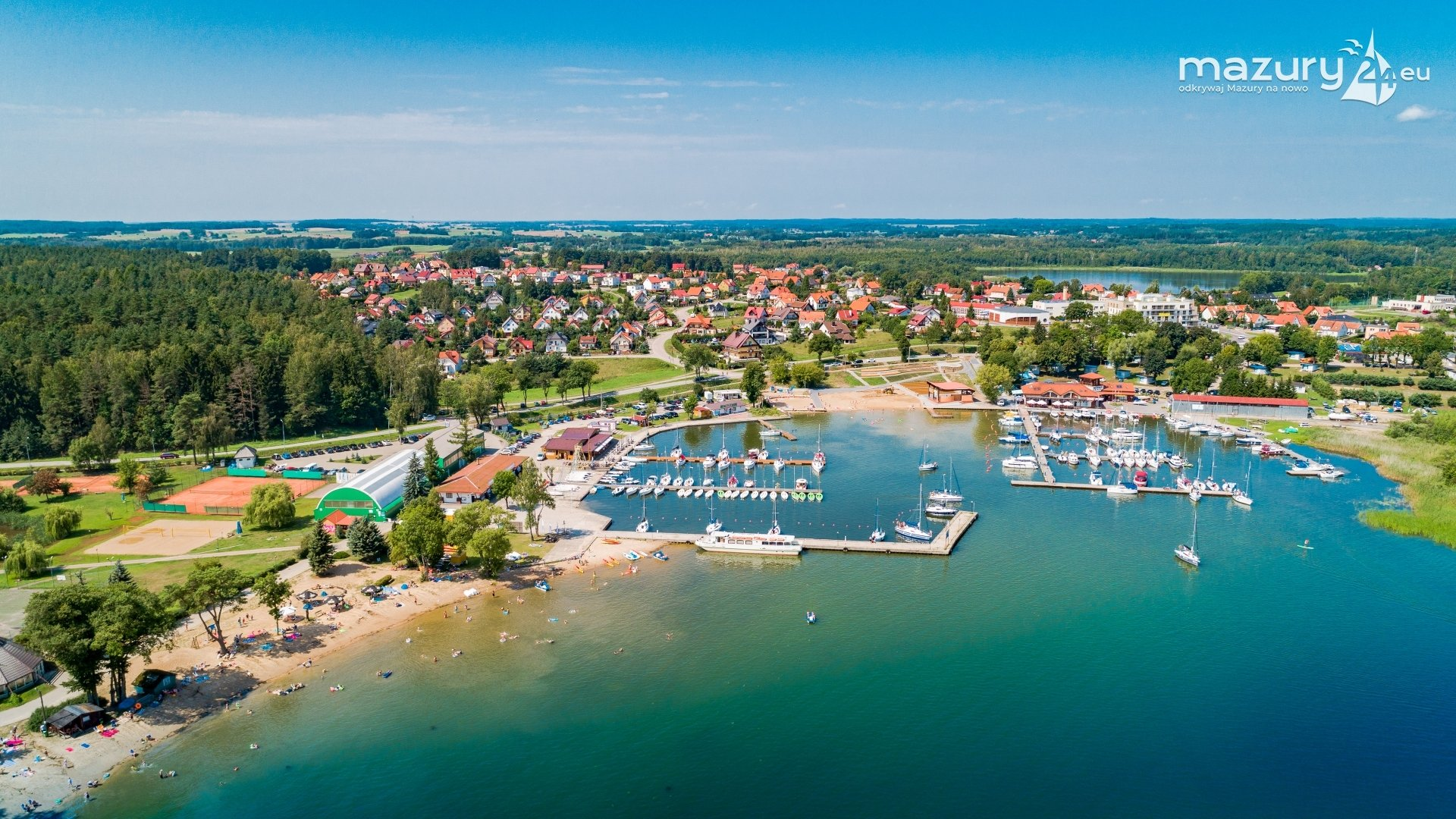
- Aerial view of Wilkasy and Lake Niegocin

- Location within Poland
- Coordinates: 54°0′44″N 21°44′7″E
- Country: Poland
- Voivodeship: Warmian-Masurian
- County: Giżycko
- Gmina: Giżycko
- Population: 2,000
- Time zone: UTC+1 (CET)
  - Summer (DST): UTC+2 (CEST)
- Vehicle registration: NGI

Wilkasy [vilˈkasɨ] is a village in the administrative district of Gmina Giżycko, within Giżycko County, Warmian-Masurian Voivodeship, in north-eastern Poland.

Located on the western shore of Lake Niegocin, it is a popular summer tourist destination in Masuria.

== History ==
The village dates back to the Middle Ages. In 1493, the old privilege of the village was renewed, and its administrator at the time was Jan Górski. As of 1625, the village had an exclusively Polish population.

== Transport ==
Wilkasy is located at the intersection of National road 59 and Voivodeship road 643. There is also a train station in the village.
