= Grodkowo, Warmian-Masurian Voivodeship =

Grodkowo
- Village
- Location within Poland
- Coordinates: 53°59′49″N 21°57′37″E
- Country: Poland
- Voivodeship: Warmian-Masurian
- County: Giżycko
- Gmina: Wydminy
- Population: 10

Grodkowo [ɡrɔtˈkɔvɔ] is a village in the administrative district of Gmina Wydminy, within Giżycko County, Warmian-Masurian Voivodeship, in northern Poland.
