= Czarnówka, Warmian-Masurian Voivodeship =

Czarnówka
- Village
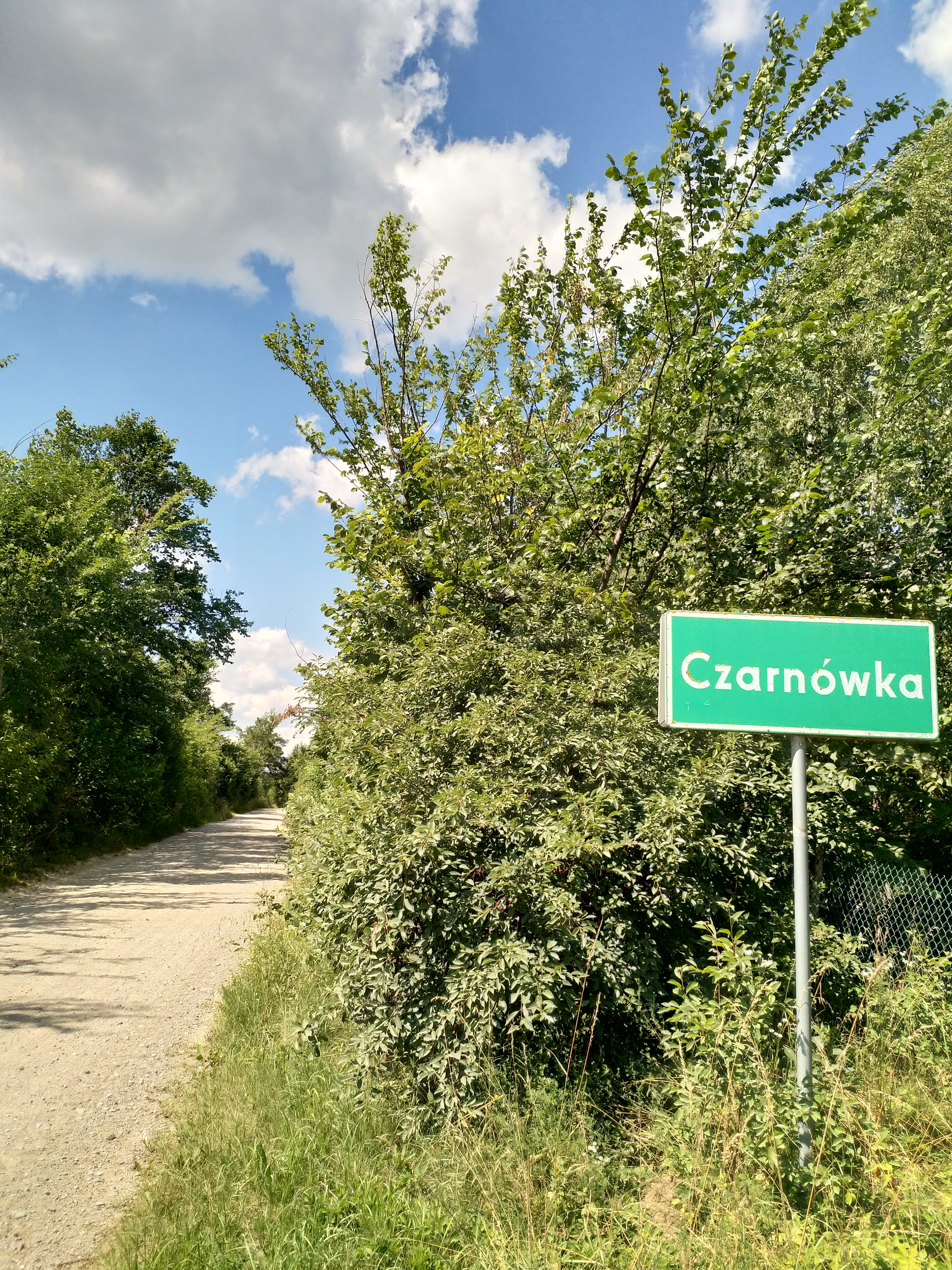
- (2023)

- Location within Poland
- Coordinates: 53°59′N 22°8′E
- Country: Poland
- Voivodeship: Warmian-Masurian
- County: Giżycko
- Gmina: Wydminy

Czarnówka [t͡ʂarˈnufka] (German: Czarnowken; 1938-45: Grundensee) is a village in the administrative district of Gmina Wydminy, within Giżycko County, Warmian-Masurian Voivodeship, in northern Poland. As of the 2021 census, Czarnówka had a population of 87 residents. The village covers an area of 8.44 square kilometers.
