= Wierciejki =

- Settlement
- Location within Poland
- Coordinates: 53°56′25″N 21°49′58″E
- Country: Poland
- Voivodeship: Warmian-Masurian
- County: Giżycko
- Gmina: Miłki

Wierciejki [vjɛrˈt͡ɕɛi̯ki] is a settlement in the administrative district of Gmina Miłki, within Giżycko County, Warmian-Masurian Voivodeship, in northern Poland.
