= Rydzewo, Giżycko County =

Rydzewo
- Village
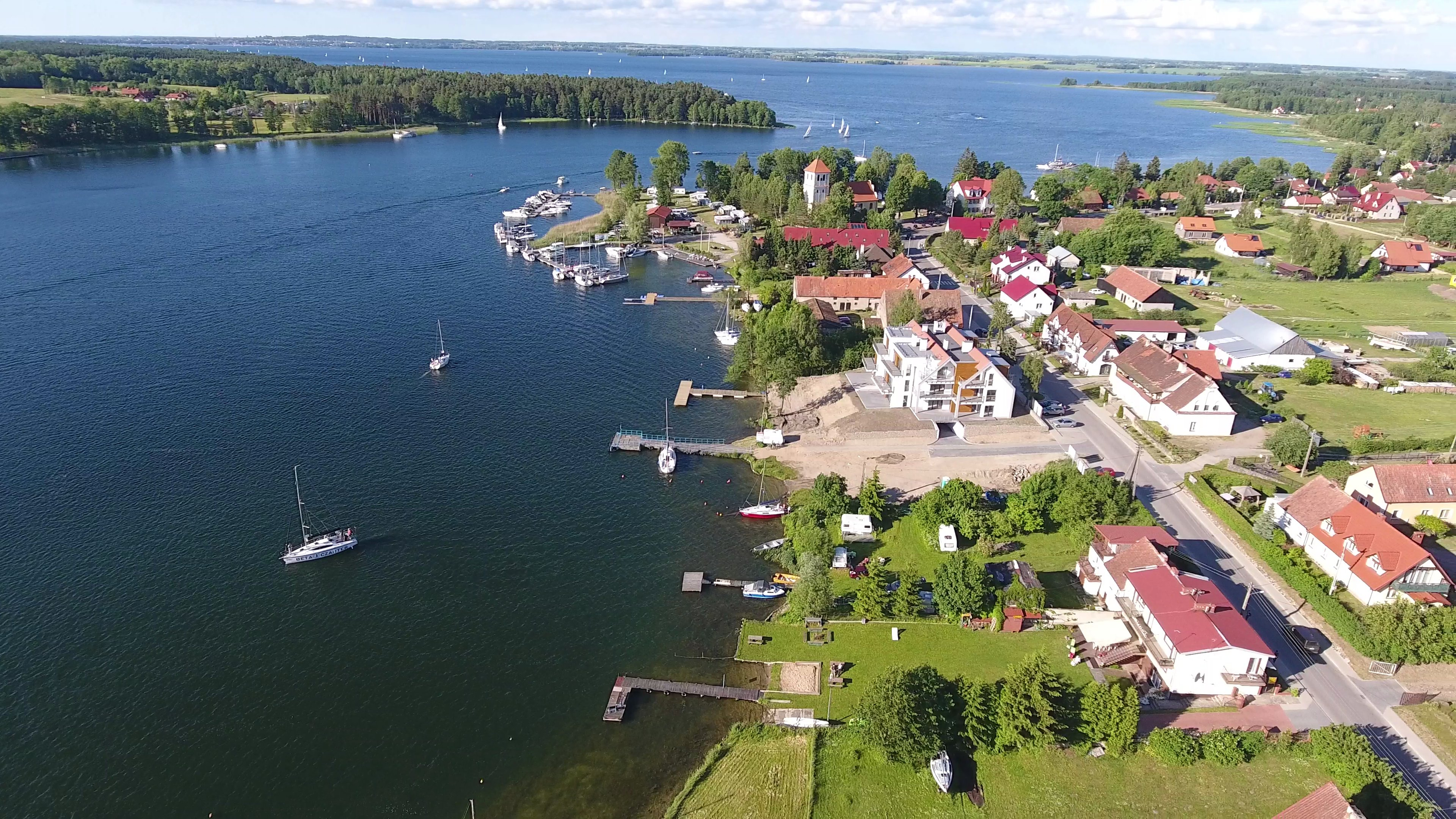
- Masurian Lakeland in Rydzewo

- Location within Poland
- Coordinates: 53°57′56″N 21°45′43″E
- Country: Poland
- Voivodeship: Warmian-Masurian
- County: Giżycko
- Gmina: Miłki
- Website: http://www.rydzewo.pl

Rydzewo [rɨˈd͡zɛvɔ] is a village in the administrative district of Gmina Miłki, in Giżycko County, Warmian-Masurian Voivodeship, in northern Poland.
