= Kożuchy Wielkie =

- Village
- Location within Poland
- Coordinates: 54°2′N 21°52′E
- Country: Poland
- Voivodeship: Warmian-Masurian
- County: Giżycko
- Gmina: Giżycko
- Population: 220

Kożuchy Wielkie [kɔˈʐuxɨ ˈvjɛlkʲɛ] is a village in the administrative district of Gmina Giżycko, within Giżycko County, Warmian-Masurian Voivodeship, in northern Poland.
