= Kleszczewo, Giżycko County =

Kleszczewo
- Village
- Location within Poland
- Coordinates: 53°57′52″N 21°49′43″E
- Country: Poland
- Voivodeship: Warmian-Masurian
- County: Giżycko
- Gmina: Miłki

Kleszczewo [klɛʂˈt͡ʂɛvɔ] is a village in the administrative district of Gmina Miłki, within Giżycko County, Warmian-Masurian Voivodeship, in northern Poland.
