= Gębałki =

- Village
- Location within Poland
- Coordinates: 53°58′45″N 22°5′40″E
- Country: Poland
- Voivodeship: Warmian-Masurian
- County: Giżycko
- Gmina: Wydminy
- Population: 20

Gębałki [ɡɛmˈbau̯ki] is a village in the administrative district of Gmina Wydminy, within Giżycko County, Warmian-Masurian Voivodeship, in northern Poland.
