= Piękna Góra, Giżycko County =

Piękna Góra
- Village
- Location within Poland
- Coordinates: 54°1′49″N 21°43′29″E
- Country: Poland
- Voivodeship: Warmian-Masurian
- County: Giżycko
- Gmina: Giżycko
- Population: 80

Piękna Góra (Polish pronunciation: [ˈpjɛŋkna ˈɡura]) is a village in the administrative district of Gmina Giżycko, within Giżycko County, Warmian-Masurian Voivodeship, in northern Poland.
