= Pietrasze =

Pietrasze may refer to the following places:

- Pietrasze, Giżycko County in Warmian-Masurian Voivodeship (north Poland)
- Pietrasze, Gołdap County in Warmian-Masurian Voivodeship (north Poland)
- Pietrasze, Olecko County in Warmian-Masurian Voivodeship (north Poland)
