= Dudka, Warmian-Masurian Voivodeship =

Dudka
- Village
- Location within Poland
- Coordinates: 53°59′8″N 21°59′39″E
- Country: Poland
- Voivodeship: Warmian-Masurian
- County: Giżycko
- Gmina: Wydminy
- Population: 130

Dudka [ˈdutka] (German: Schaderswert) is a village in the administrative district of Gmina Wydminy, within Giżycko County, Warmian-Masurian Voivodeship, in northern Poland.
