= Nowe Sołdany =

- Village
- Location within Poland
- Coordinates: 54°4′3″N 21°53′13″E
- Country: Poland
- Voivodeship: Warmian-Masurian
- County: Giżycko
- Gmina: Giżycko
- Population: 90

Nowe Sołdany [ˈnɔvɛ sɔu̯ˈdanɨ] is a village in the administrative district of Gmina Giżycko, within Giżycko County, Warmian-Masurian Voivodeship, in northern Poland.
