= Czyprki, Giżycko County =

Czyprki
- Village
- Location within Poland
- Coordinates: 53°57′N 21°57′E
- Country: Poland
- Voivodeship: Warmian-Masurian
- County: Giżycko
- Gmina: Miłki

Czyprki [ˈt͡ʂɨprki] is a village in the administrative district of Gmina Miłki, within Giżycko County, Warmian-Masurian Voivodeship, in northern Poland.

Notable features include a prominent shrine to Jesus and Mary next to the bus station.
