= Talki, Warmian-Masurian Voivodeship =

Talki
- Village
- Location within Poland
- Coordinates: 53°54′31″N 22°0′0″E
- Country: Poland
- Voivodeship: Warmian-Masurian
- County: Giżycko
- Gmina: Wydminy
- Population: 210
- Website: http://www.sptalki.wydminy.net

Talki [ˈtalki] is a village in the administrative district of Gmina Wydminy, within Giżycko County, Warmian-Masurian Voivodeship, in northern Poland.
