= Lipińskie =

Lipińskie may refer to the following places:

- Lipińskie, Masovian Voivodeship (east-central Poland)
- Lipińskie, Podlaskie Voivodeship (north-east Poland)
- Lipińskie, Giżycko County in Warmian-Masurian Voivodeship (north Poland)
- Lipińskie, Pisz County in Warmian-Masurian Voivodeship (north Poland)
