= Doba, Warmian-Masurian Voivodeship =

Doba
- Village
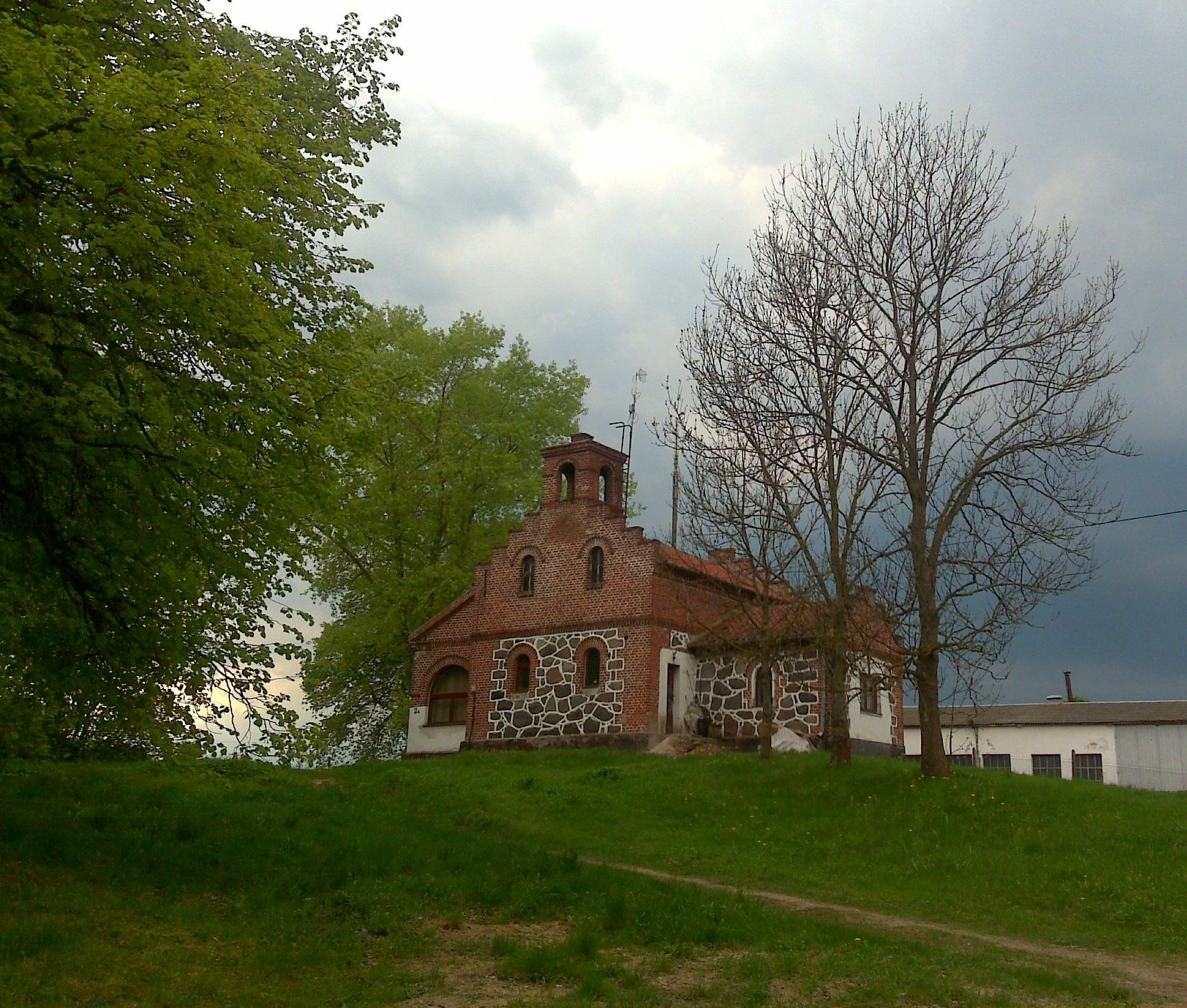

- Location within Poland
- Coordinates: 54°5′N 21°36′E
- Country: Poland
- Voivodeship: Warmian-Masurian
- County: Giżycko
- Gmina: Giżycko
- Population: 210
- Time zone: UTC+1 (CET)
  - Summer (DST): UTC+2 (CEST)
- Vehicle registration: NGI

Doba [ˈdɔba] is a village in the administrative district of Gmina Giżycko, within Giżycko County, Warmian-Masurian Voivodeship, in northern Poland. It is located on the western shore of Dobskie Lake in the region of Masuria.
