= Mrówki, Warmian-Masurian Voivodeship =

Mrówki
- Village
- Location within Poland
- Coordinates: 53°53′54″N 21°29′29″E
- Country: Poland
- Voivodeship: Warmian-Masurian
- County: Giżycko
- Gmina: Ryn
- Population: 20

Mrówki [ˈmrufki] is a village in the administrative district of Gmina Ryn, within Giżycko County, Warmian-Masurian Voivodeship, in northern Poland.
