= Siedliska, Giżycko County =

Siedliska
- Village
- Location within Poland
- Coordinates: 54°0′N 21°56′E
- Country: Poland
- Voivodeship: Warmian-Masurian
- County: Giżycko
- Gmina: Wydminy
- Founded: 1555
- Time zone: UTC+1 (CET)
  - Summer (DST): UTC+2 (CEST)
- Vehicle registration: NGI

Siedliska [ɕɛdˈlʲiska] is a village in the administrative district of Gmina Wydminy, within Giżycko County, Warmian-Masurian Voivodeship, in north-eastern Poland. It is located in the region of Masuria.

== History ==
The origins of the village date back to 1555, when a man named Sebastian bought land to establish a village. The name Siedliska is of Polish origin and is a common name for villages throughout Poland. As of 1625, the population was solely Polish. In the late 19th century, the village had a population of 692.

== Transport ==
The Voivodeship road 655 runs through Siedliska, and there is a train station in the village.
