= Ławki, Giżycko County =

Ławki
- Village
- Location within Poland
- Coordinates: 53°54′48″N 21°34′59″E
- Country: Poland
- Voivodeship: Warmian-Masurian
- County: Giżycko
- Gmina: Ryn
- Population: 360

Ławki [ˈwafki] is a village in the administrative district of Gmina Ryn, within Giżycko County, Warmian-Masurian Voivodeship, in northern Poland. The village hosted a state farm during the communist era.
