= Kalinowo, Giżycko County =

Kalinowo
- Village
- Location within Poland
- Coordinates: 54°1′15″N 21°39′48″E
- Country: Poland
- Voivodeship: Warmian-Masurian
- County: Giżycko
- Gmina: Giżycko
- Population: 100

Kalinowo [kaliˈnɔvɔ] is a village in the administrative district of Gmina Giżycko, within Giżycko County, Warmian-Masurian Voivodeship, in northern Poland.
