= Berkowo, Warmian-Masurian Voivodeship =

Berkowo
- Village
- Location within Poland
- Coordinates: 53°52′29″N 22°7′35″E
- Country: Poland
- Voivodeship: Warmian-Masurian
- County: Giżycko
- Gmina: Wydminy
- Population: 100

Berkowo [bɛrˈkɔvɔ] (German: Berghof) is a village in the administrative district of Gmina Wydminy, within Giżycko County, Warmian-Masurian Voivodeship, in northern Poland.
