= Grzybowo, Giżycko County =

Grzybowo
- Village
- Location within Poland
- Coordinates: 54°3′N 21°36′E
- Country: Poland
- Voivodeship: Warmian-Masurian
- County: Giżycko
- Gmina: Ryn

Grzybowo [ɡʐɨˈbɔvɔ] (German Grzybowen (before 1929), Birkensee) is a village in the administrative district of Gmina Ryn, within Giżycko County, Warmian-Masurian Voivodeship, in northern Poland.
