= Szczybały Giżyckie =

- Village
- Location within Poland
- Coordinates: 53°59′N 21°42′E
- Country: Poland
- Voivodeship: Warmian-Masurian
- County: Giżycko
- Gmina: Giżycko

Szczybały Giżyckie [ʂt͡ʂɨˈbawɨ ɡiˈʐɨt͡skʲɛ] is a village located in the administrative district of Gmina Giżycko, within Giżycko County, Warmian-Masurian Voivodeship, in northern Poland.
