= FM/TV Mast Miłki =

FM/TV Mast Giżycko/Miłki
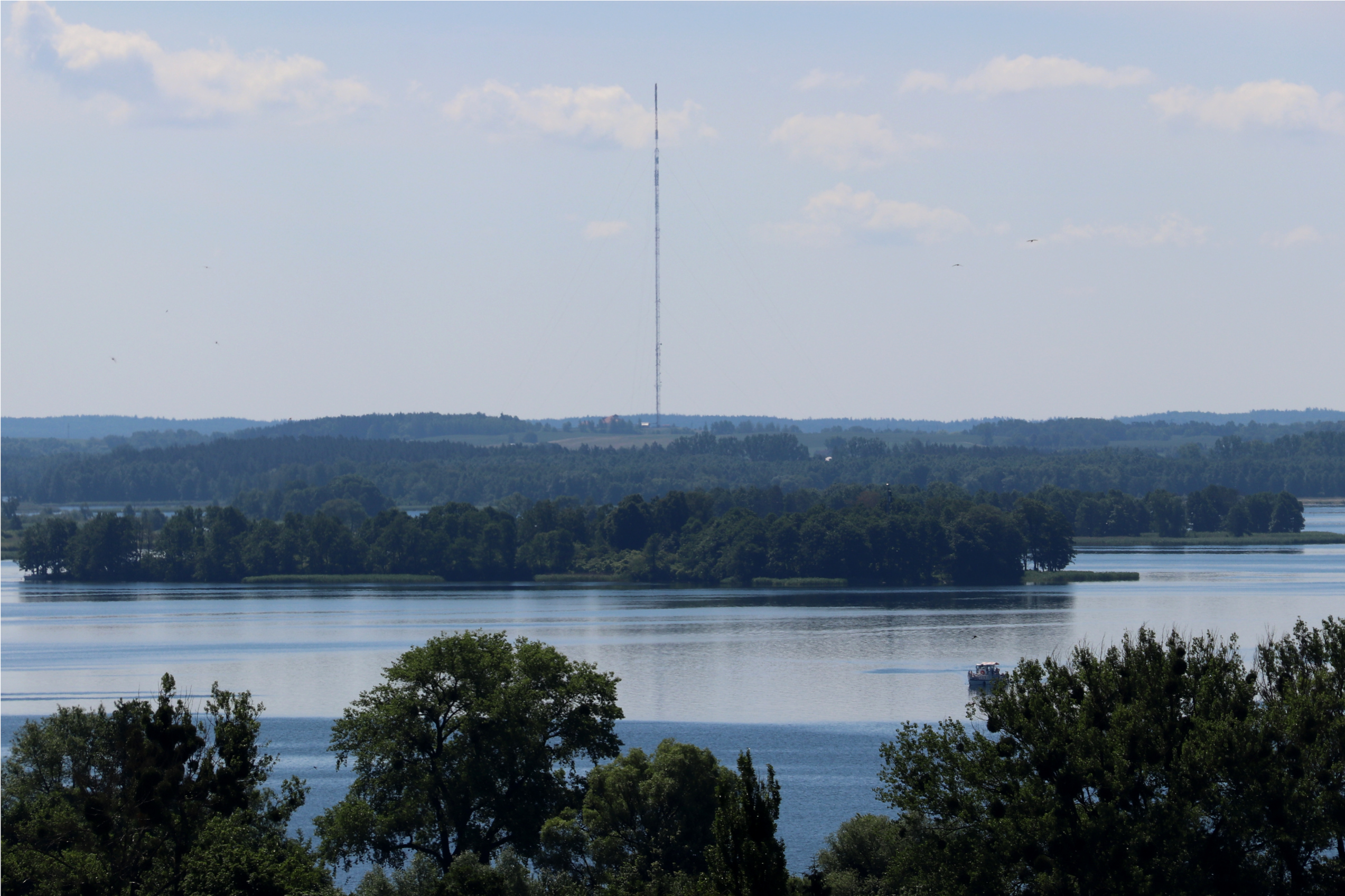
- FM/TV Mast Giżycko/Miłki
- Interactive map of the FM/TV Mast Giżycko/Miłki area

General information
- Status: Completed
- Type: TV-Mast
- Location: Miłki, Poland
- Completed: 1998

Height
- Height: 327 m (1,073 ft)

FM/TV Mast Miłki
- Coordinates: 53°56′16″N 21°50′44″E

FM/TV Mast Giżycko/Miłki (Polish: RTCN Giżycko/Miłki) is a 327-metre (1,073 ft)-high guyed mast located at Miłki near Giżycko, Warmian-Masurian Voivodeship in Poland, built in 1998. It was raised on the hill near the Wojnowo lake and is the 9th highest mast in Poland and the 2nd highest in the Warmian-Masurian Voivodeship.

== Transmitted programmes ==
=== Digital television MPEG-4 ===
Multiplex Number	Programme in Multiplex	Frequency	Channel	Power ERP	Polarisation	Antenna Diagram	Modulation
MUX 1	TVP1; Stopklatka TV; TVP ABC; TV Trwam; Eska TV; TTV; Polo TV; ATM Rozrywka	650 MHz	43	100 kW	Horizontal	ND	64 QAM
MUX 2	Polsat; TVN; TV4; TV Puls; TVN 7; Puls 2; TV6; Super Polsat	690 MHz	48	100 kW	Horizontal	ND	64 QAM
MUX 3	TVP1 HD; TVP2 HD; TVP Olsztyn; TVP Kultura; TVP Historia; TVP Polonia; TVP Rozrywka; TVP Info	706 MHz	50	90 kW	Horizontal	ND	64 QAM

=== FM radio ===
Program	Frequency	Transmission Power	Polarisation	Antenna Diagram
Polskie Radio Program I	97,10 MHz	6 kW	Vertical	ND
Polskie Radio Program II	92,60 MHz	10 kW	Vertical	ND
Polskie Radio Program III	94,40 MHz	10 kW	Vertical	ND
Polskie Radio Olsztyn	99,60 MHz	10 kW	Vertical	ND
RMF FM	102,00 MHz	10 kW	Vertical	ND
Radio ZET	104,00 MHz	10 kW	Vertical	ND

== See also ==
- List of masts
