= Zelki =

- Village
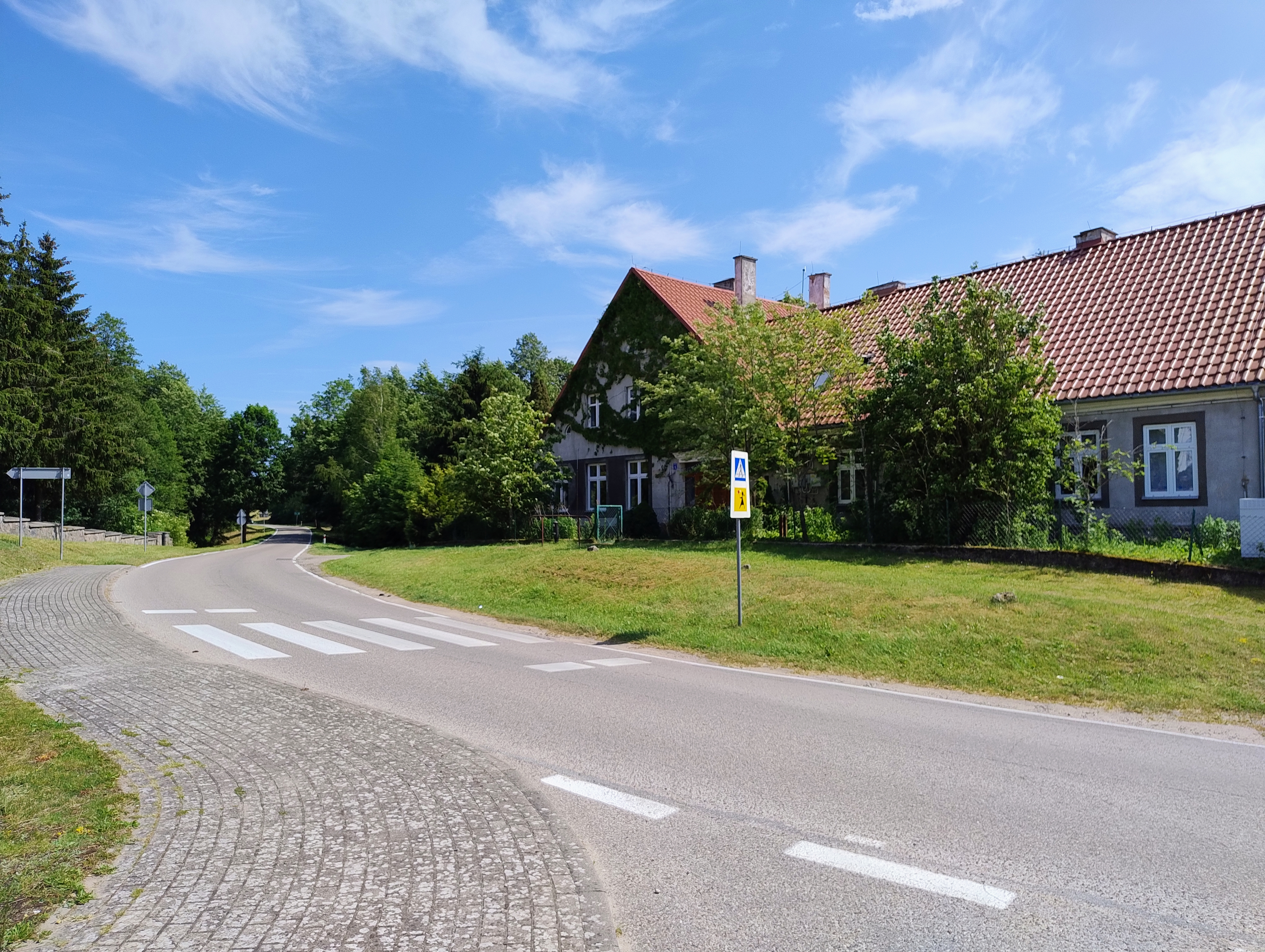
- Zelki (2025)

- Location within Poland
- Coordinates: 53°53′N 22°5′E
- Country: Poland
- Voivodeship: Warmian-Masurian
- County: Giżycko
- Gmina: Wydminy
- Website: http://www.zelki.go.pl

Zelki [ˈzɛlki] is a village in the administrative district of Gmina Wydminy, within Giżycko County, Warmian-Masurian Voivodeship, in northern Poland.
