= Staświny-Osada =

- Settlement
- Location within Poland
- Coordinates: 53°57′45″N 21°53′17″E
- Country: Poland
- Voivodeship: Warmian-Masurian
- County: Giżycko
- Gmina: Miłki

Staświny-Osada [staɕˈfinɨ ɔˈsada] is a settlement in the administrative district of Gmina Miłki, within Giżycko County, Warmian-Masurian Voivodeship, in northern Poland.
