= Przykop =

Przykop may refer to the following places:

- Przykop, Subcarpathian Voivodeship (south-east Poland)
- Przykop, Giżycko County in Warmian-Masurian Voivodeship (north Poland)
- Przykop, Olsztyn County in Warmian-Masurian Voivodeship (north Poland)
