= Mazuchówka =

- Village
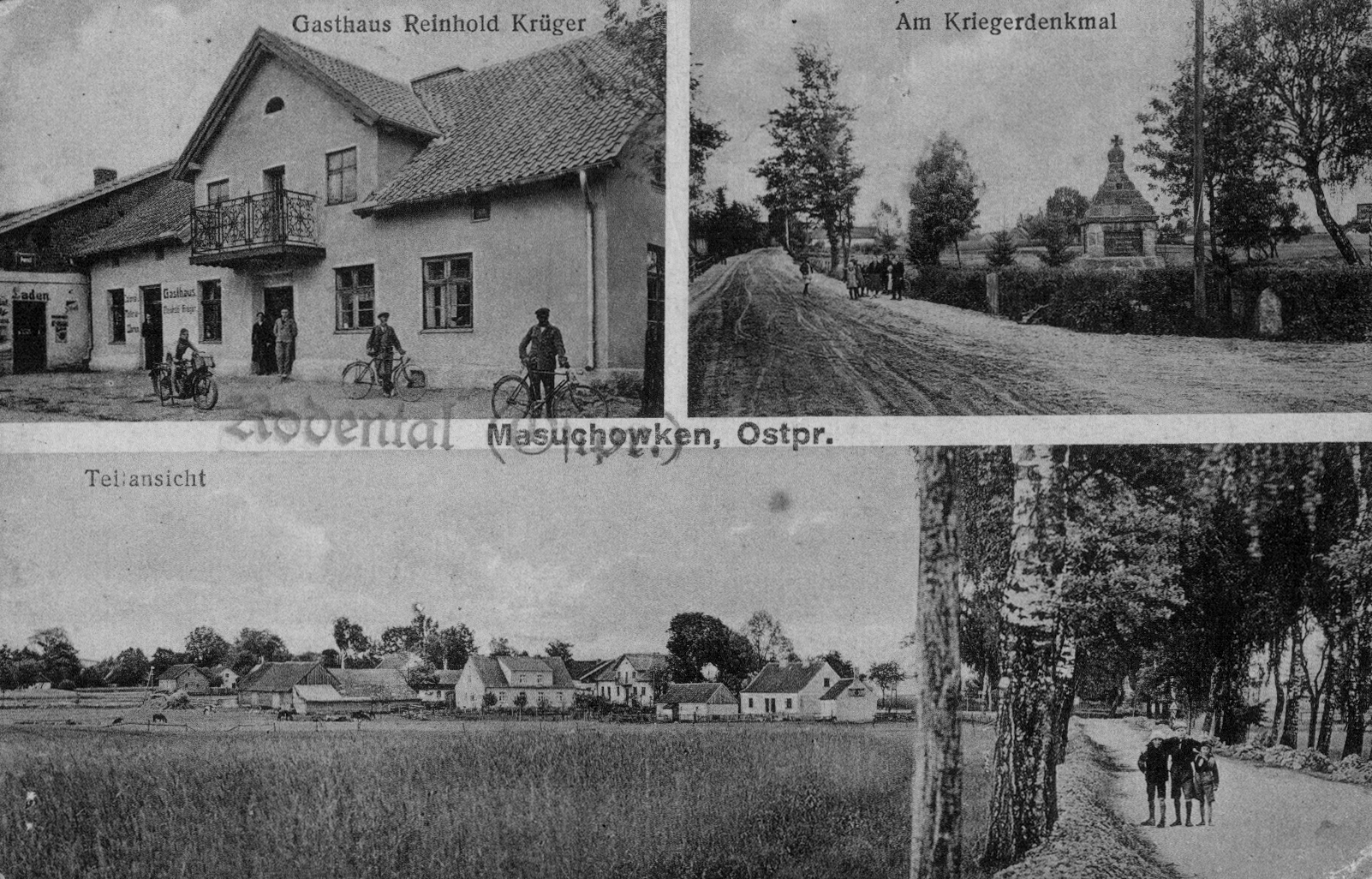

- Location within Poland
- Coordinates: 54°0′N 22°4′E
- Country: Poland
- Voivodeship: Warmian-Masurian
- County: Giżycko
- Gmina: Wydminy

Mazuchówka [mazuˈxufka] is a village in the administrative district of Gmina Wydminy, within Giżycko County, Warmian-Masurian Voivodeship, in northern Poland.
