= Radzie, Warmian-Masurian Voivodeship =

Radzie
- Village
- Location within Poland
- Coordinates: 53°56′N 22°5′E
- Country: Poland
- Voivodeship: Warmian-Masurian
- County: Giżycko
- Gmina: Wydminy

Radzie [ˈrad͡ʑɛ] is a village in the administrative district of Gmina Wydminy, within Giżycko County, Warmian-Masurian Voivodeship, in northern Poland.
