= Gmina Wydminy =

Gmina Wydminy Wydminy Commune
- Gmina
- Coat of arms
- Interactive map of Gmina Wydminy
- Coordinates (Wydminy): 53°59′N 22°2′E
- Country: Poland
- Voivodeship: Warmian-Masurian
- County: Giżycko
- Seat: Wydminy

Area
  - Total: 233.46 km^{2} (90.14 sq mi)

Population (2006)
  - Total: 6,650
  - Density: 28.5/km^{2} (73.8/sq mi)
- Website: https://web.archive.org/web/20070801080753/http://www.wydminy.net/

Gmina Wydminy is a rural gmina (administrative district) in Giżycko County, Warmian-Masurian Voivodeship, in northern Poland. Its seat is the village of Wydminy, which lies approximately 20 kilometres (12 mi) east of Giżycko and 104 km (65 mi) east of the regional capital Olsztyn.

The gmina covers an area of 233.46 square kilometres (90.1 sq mi), and as of 2006 its total population is 6,650.

== Villages ==
Gmina Wydminy contains the villages and settlements of Berkowo, Biała Giżycka, Cybulki, Czarnówka, Dudka, Ernstowo, Franciszkowo, Gajrowskie, Gawliki Małe, Gawliki Wielkie, Gębałki, Grądzkie, Grodkowo, Hejbuty, Kowalewskie, Krzywe, Łękuk Mały, Malinka, Mazuchówka, Okrągłe, Orłowo, Pamry, Pańska Wola, Pietrasze, Radzie, Ranty, Róg Orłowski, Rostki, Rydze, Siedliska, Siejba, Siemionki, Skomack Mały, Sucholaski, Szczepanki, Szczybały Orłowskie, Talki, Wężówka, Wólka Cybulska, Wydminy and Zelki.

== Neighbouring gminas ==
Gmina Wydminy is bordered by the gminas of Giżycko, Kruklanki, Miłki, Orzysz, Stare Juchy and Świętajno.
