= Kąp, Gmina Giżycko =

Kąp
- Village
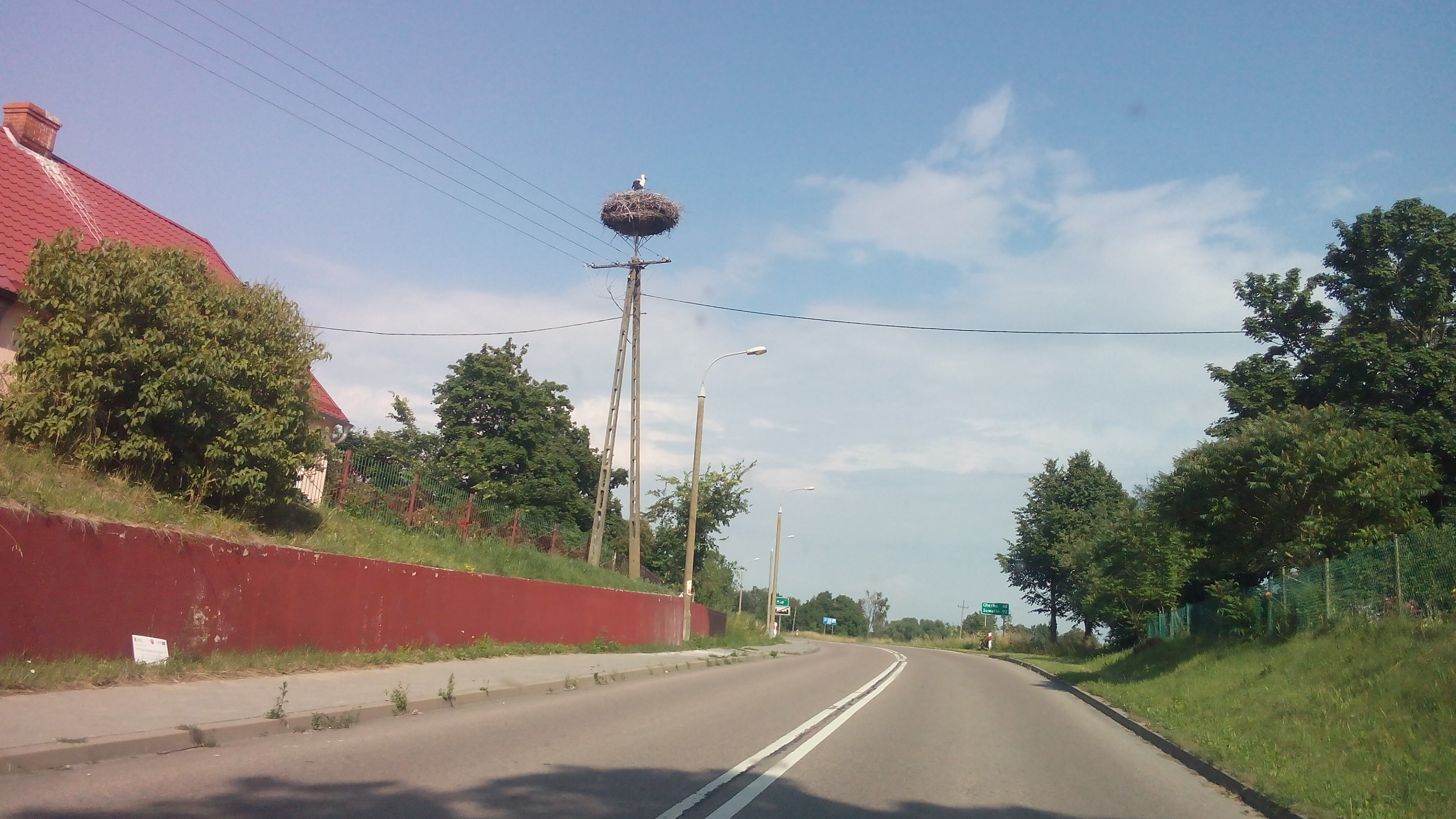

- Location within Poland
- Coordinates: 54°00′03″N 21°50′38″E
- Country: Poland
- Voivodeship: Warmian-Masurian
- County: Giżycko
- Gmina: Giżycko
- Founded: 1507
- Time zone: UTC+1 (CET)
  - Summer (DST): UTC+2 (CEST)
- Vehicle registration: NGI

Kąp [kɔmp] is a village in the administrative district of Gmina Giżycko, within Giżycko County, Warmian-Masurian Voivodeship, in north-eastern Poland. It is located in the historic region of Masuria.

For centuries, the village was inhabited by Poles, and as of 1625, it had an exclusively Polish population.
