= Ruda, Giżycko County =

Ruda
- Village
- Location within Poland
- Coordinates: 53°58′39″N 21°50′19″E
- Country: Poland
- Voivodeship: Warmian-Masurian
- County: Giżycko
- Gmina: Miłki

Ruda [ˈruda] is a village in the administrative district of Gmina Miłki, within Giżycko County, Warmian-Masurian Voivodeship, in northern Poland.
