= Zielony Gaj, Giżycko County =

Zielony Gaj
- Village
- Location within Poland
- Coordinates: 54°4′23″N 21°50′51″E
- Country: Poland
- Voivodeship: Warmian-Masurian
- County: Giżycko
- Gmina: Giżycko
- Population: 100

Zielony Gaj (Polish pronunciation: [ʑɛˈlɔnɨ ˈɡaj]) is a village in the administrative district of Gmina Giżycko, within Giżycko County, Warmian-Masurian Voivodeship, in northern Poland.
