= Wydminy =

- Village
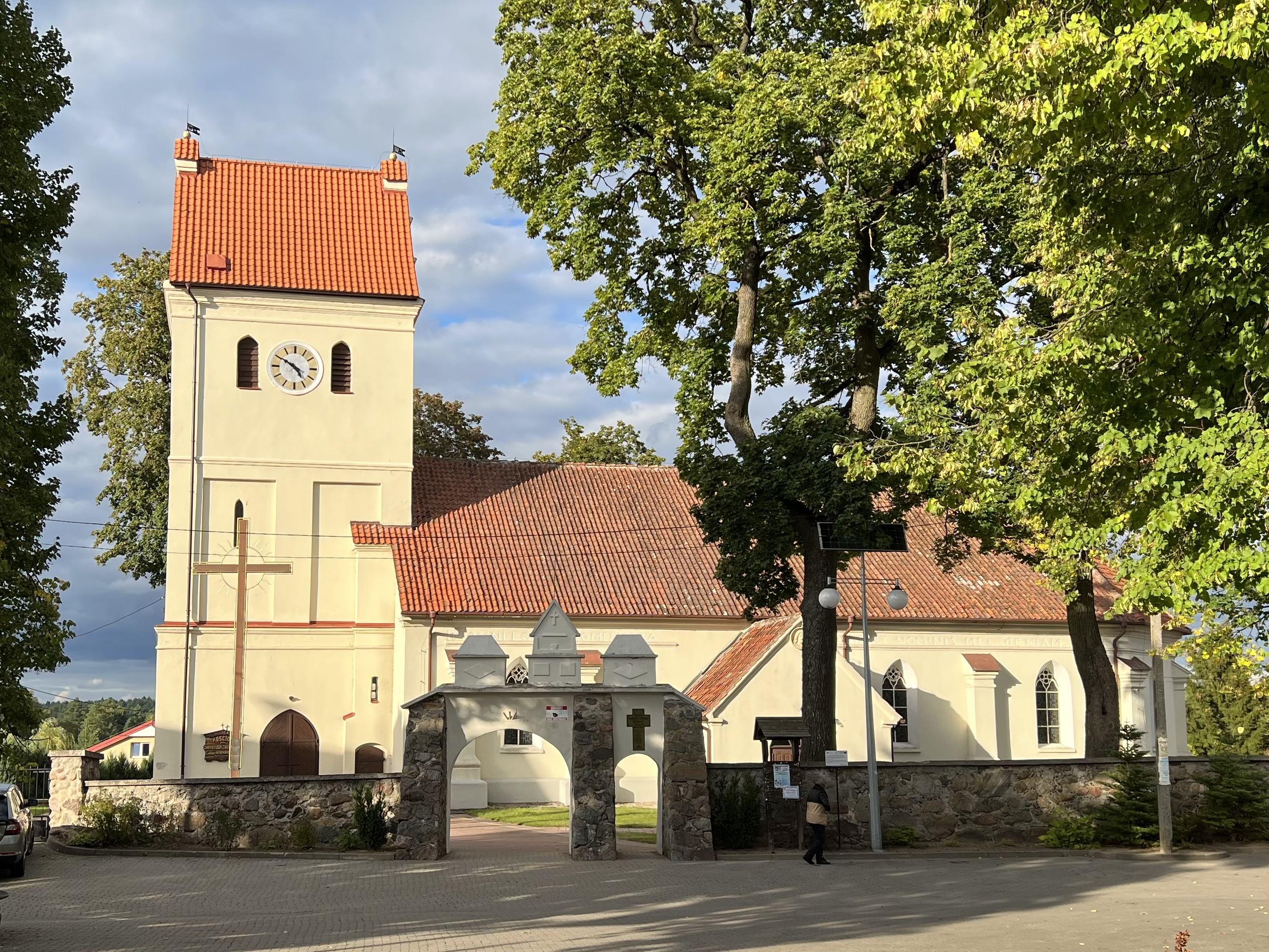
- Christ the Redeemer church in Wydminy

- Location within Poland
- Coordinates: 53°59′N 22°2′E
- Country: Poland
- Voivodeship: Warmian-Masurian
- County: Giżycko
- Gmina: Wydminy

Population
  - Total: 2,300
- Time zone: UTC+1 (CET)
  - Summer (DST): UTC+2 (CEST)
- Postal code: 11-510
- Vehicle registration: NGI
- Website: http://www.wydminy.net

Wydminy [vɨdˈminɨ] (German: Widminnen) is a village in Giżycko County, Warmian-Masurian Voivodeship, in north-eastern Poland. It is the seat of the gmina (administrative district) called Gmina Wydminy. It is situated on the southern shore of Wydmińskie Lake in Masuria.

== History ==
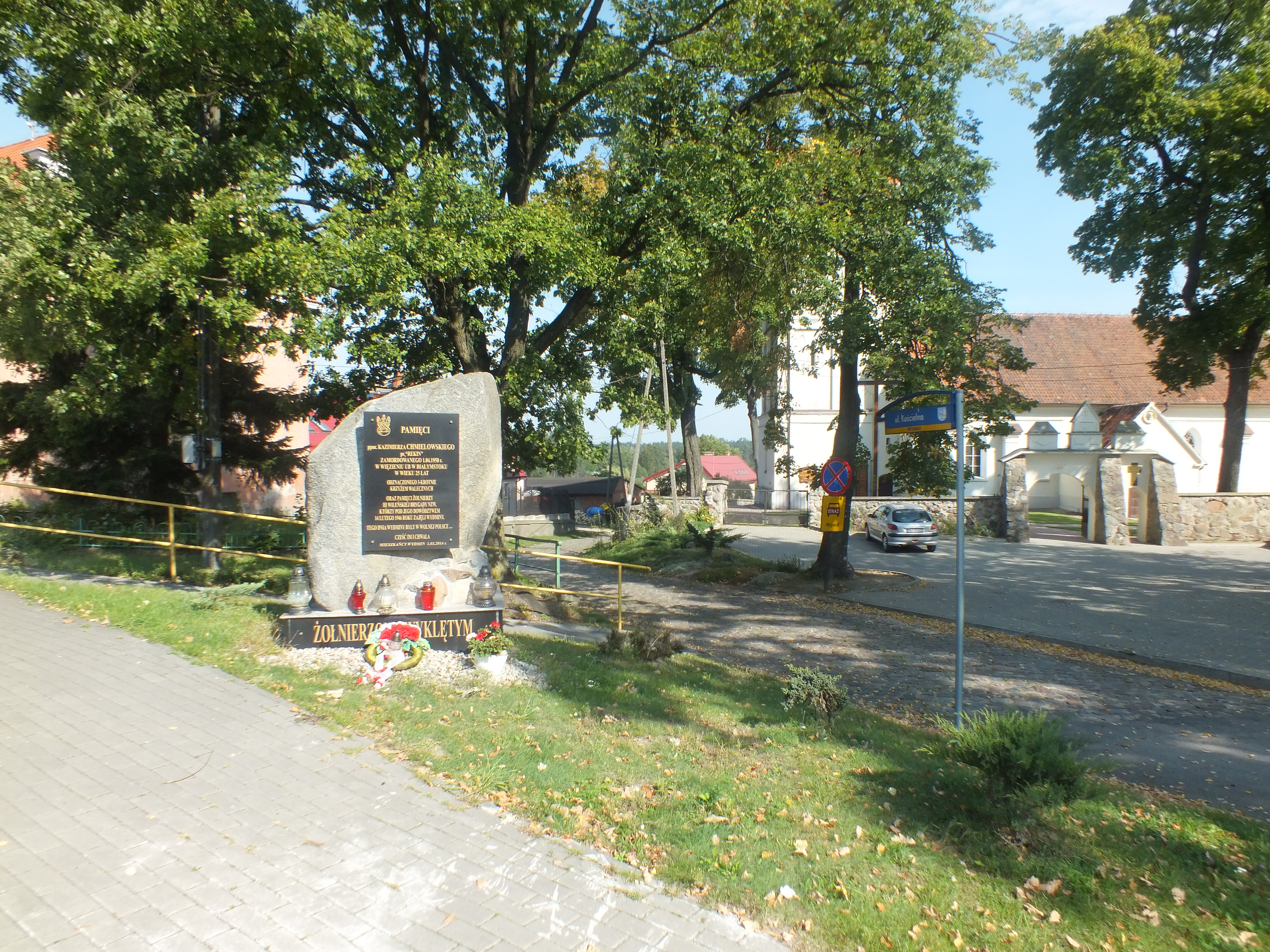
Cursed soldiers Memorial

As of 1600, the population of the village was exclusively Polish. 227 people died during the Great Northern War plague outbreak in 1710. The settlement hosted six annual fairs in the late 19th century.

On 14 February 1946, Wydminy was captured by the anti-communist partisans of the National Military Union. A memorial to the "Cursed soldiers" was unveiled in 2014.

Wydminy joined Cittaslow in 2018, but withdrew in 2024.

== Transport ==
There is a train station in Wydminy, and the Voivodeship road 655 passes through the village.
