= Rostki, Giżycko County =

Rostki
- Village
- Location within Poland
- Coordinates: 53°55′9″N 22°0′57″E
- Country: Poland
- Voivodeship: Warmian-Masurian
- County: Giżycko
- Gmina: Wydminy
- Population: 50

Rostki [ˈrɔstki] is a village in the administrative district of Gmina Wydminy, within Giżycko County, Warmian-Masurian Voivodeship, in northern Poland.
