= Siemionki, Warmian-Masurian Voivodeship =

Siemionki
- Village
- Location within Poland
- Coordinates: 53°58′N 22°2′E
- Country: Poland
- Voivodeship: Warmian-Masurian
- County: Giżycko
- Gmina: Wydminy

Siemionki [ɕɛˈmjɔnki] is a village in the administrative district of Gmina Wydminy, within Giżycko County, Warmian-Masurian Voivodeship, in northern Poland.
