= Przykop, Giżycko County =

Przykop
- Settlement
- Location within Poland
- Coordinates: 53°55′41″N 21°50′34″E
- Country: Poland
- Voivodeship: Warmian-Masurian
- County: Giżycko
- Gmina: Miłki

Przykop [ˈpʂɨkɔp] is a settlement in the administrative district of Gmina Miłki, within Giżycko County, Warmian-Masurian Voivodeship, in northern Poland.
