= Gmina Ryn =

Gmina Ryn Ryn Commune
- Gmina
- Coat of arms
- Interactive map of Gmina Ryn
- Coordinates (Ryn): 53°56′16″N 21°32′53″E
- Country: Poland
- Voivodeship: Warmian-Masurian
- County: Giżycko
- Seat: Ryn

Area
  - Total: 211.21 km^{2} (81.55 sq mi)

Population (2006)
  - Total: 5,986
  - Density: 28.34/km^{2} (73.40/sq mi)
  - Urban: 3,006
  - Rural: 2,980
- Website: http://www.ryn.pl/

Gmina Ryn is an urban-rural gmina (administrative district) in Giżycko County, Warmian-Masurian Voivodeship, in northern Poland. Its seat is the town of Ryn, which lies approximately 18 kilometres (11 mi) south-west of Giżycko and 71 km (44 mi) east of the regional capital Olsztyn.

The gmina covers an area of 211.21 square kilometres (81.5 sq mi), and as of 2006 its total population is 5,986 (out of which the population of Ryn amounts to 3,006, and the population of the rural part of the gmina is 2,980).

== Villages ==
Apart from the town of Ryn, Gmina Ryn contains the villages and settlements of Bachorza, Canki, Głąbowo, Grzybowo, Hermanowa Wola, Jeziorko, Knis, Knis-Podewsie, Kronowo, Krzyżany, Ławki, Ławki PGR, Mioduńskie, Mleczkowo, Monetki, Mrówki, Orło, Prażmowo, Rybical, Ryński Dwór, Ryńskie Pole, Siejkowo, Skop, Skorupki, Słabowo, Stara Rudówka, Sterławki Wielkie, Szymonka, Tros, Wejdyki and Zielony Lasek.

== Neighbouring gminas ==
Gmina Ryn is bordered by the gminas of Giżycko, Kętrzyn, Mikołajki, Miłki and Mrągowo.
