= Danowo, Giżycko County =

Danowo
- Village
- Location within Poland
- Coordinates: 53°52′29″N 21°56′52″E
- Country: Poland
- Voivodeship: Warmian-Masurian
- County: Giżycko
- Gmina: Miłki

Danowo [daˈnɔvɔ] is a village in the administrative district of Gmina Miłki, within Giżycko County, Warmian-Masurian Voivodeship, in northern Poland.
