= Guty, Giżycko County =

Guty
- Village
- Location within Poland
- Coordinates: 54°4′N 21°41′E
- Country: Poland
- Voivodeship: Warmian-Masurian
- County: Giżycko
- Gmina: Giżycko

Guty [ˈɡutɨ] is a village in the administrative district of Gmina Giżycko, within Giżycko County, Warmian-Masurian Voivodeship, in northern Poland.
