= Sulimy, Giżycko County =

Sulimy
- Village
- Location within Poland
- Coordinates: 54°3′N 21°49′E
- Country: Poland
- Voivodeship: Warmian-Masurian
- County: Giżycko
- Gmina: Giżycko

Sulimy [suˈlimɨ] (German: Sulimmen) is a village in the administrative district of Gmina Giżycko, within Giżycko County, Warmian-Masurian Voivodeship, in northern Poland.
