= Gmina Giżycko =

Gmina Giżycko Giżycko Commune
- Gmina
- Coat of arms
- Interactive map of Gmina Giżycko
- Coordinates (Giżycko): 54°2′24″N 21°45′32″E
- Country: Poland
- Voivodeship: Warmian-Masurian
- County: Giżycko
- Seat: Giżycko

Area
  - Total: 289.76 km^{2} (111.88 sq mi)

Population (2006)
  - Total: 7,671
  - Density: 26.47/km^{2} (68.57/sq mi)
- Website: https://web.archive.org/web/20070509150819/http://www.ugg.pl/www/index.php

Gmina Giżycko is a rural gmina (administrative district) in Giżycko County, Warmian-Masurian Voivodeship, in northern Poland. Its seat is the town of Giżycko, although the town is not part of the territory of the gmina.

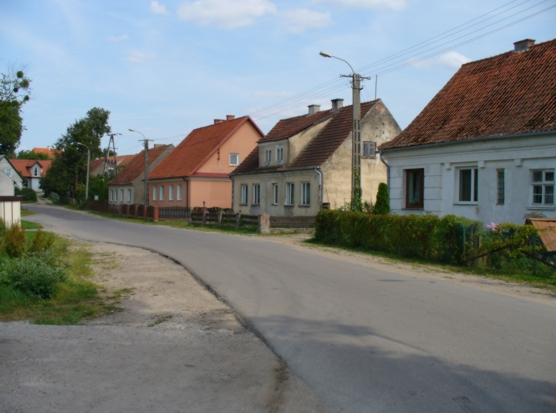

The gmina covers an area of 289.76 square kilometres (111.9 sq mi), and as of 2006 its total population is 7,671.

== Neighbouring gminas ==
Gmina Giżycko is bordered by the town of Giżycko and by the gminas of Kętrzyn, Kruklanki, Miłki, Pozezdrze, Ryn, Węgorzewo and Wydminy.

== Villages ==
The gmina contains the following villages having the status of sołectwo: Antonowo, Bogacko, Bogaczewo, Bystry, Doba, Gajewo, Grajwo, Guty, Kąp, Kamionki, Kożuchy Wielkie, Kruklin, Pieczonki, Pierkunowo, Sołdany, Spytkowo, Sterławki Małe, Sulimy, Szczybały Giżyckie, Świdry, Upałty, Upałty Małe, Wilkasy, Wilkaski, Wronka and Wrony.

There are also 12 villages without sołectwo status: Wola Bogaczkowska, Dziewiszewo, Fuleda, Kożuchy Małe, Nowe Sołdany, Zielony Gaj, Sterławki Średnie, Gorazdowo, Strzelce, Kalinowo, Piękna Góra and Wrony Nowe.
