= Miłki =

- Village
- Location within Poland
- Coordinates: 53°56′N 21°52′E
- Country: Poland
- Voivodeship: Warmian-Masurian
- County: Giżycko
- Gmina: Miłki
- Population: 580

Miłki [ˈmiu̯ki] is a village in Giżycko County, Warmian-Masurian Voivodeship, in northern Poland. It is the seat of the gmina (administrative district) called Gmina Miłki.

== Notable residents ==
- Joachim Kaiser (1928−2017), German music, literature and theatre critic
