= Gmina Miłki =

Gmina Miłki Miłki Commune
- Gmina
- Flag Coat of arms
- Interactive map of Gmina Miłki
- Coordinates (Miłki): 53°56′N 21°52′E
- Country: Poland
- Voivodeship: Warmian-Masurian
- County: Giżycko
- Seat: Miłki

Area
  - Total: 169.43 km^{2} (65.42 sq mi)

Population (2006)
  - Total: 3,861
  - Density: 22.79/km^{2} (59.02/sq mi)
- Time zone: UTC+1 (CET)
  - Summer (DST): UTC+2 (CEST)
- Vehicle registration: NGI
- Website: http://www.milki.pl/

Gmina Miłki is a rural gmina (administrative district) in Giżycko County, Warmian-Masurian Voivodeship, in northern Poland. Its seat is the village of Miłki, which lies approximately 14 kilometres (9 mi) south-east of Giżycko and 92 km (57 mi) east of the regional capital Olsztyn.

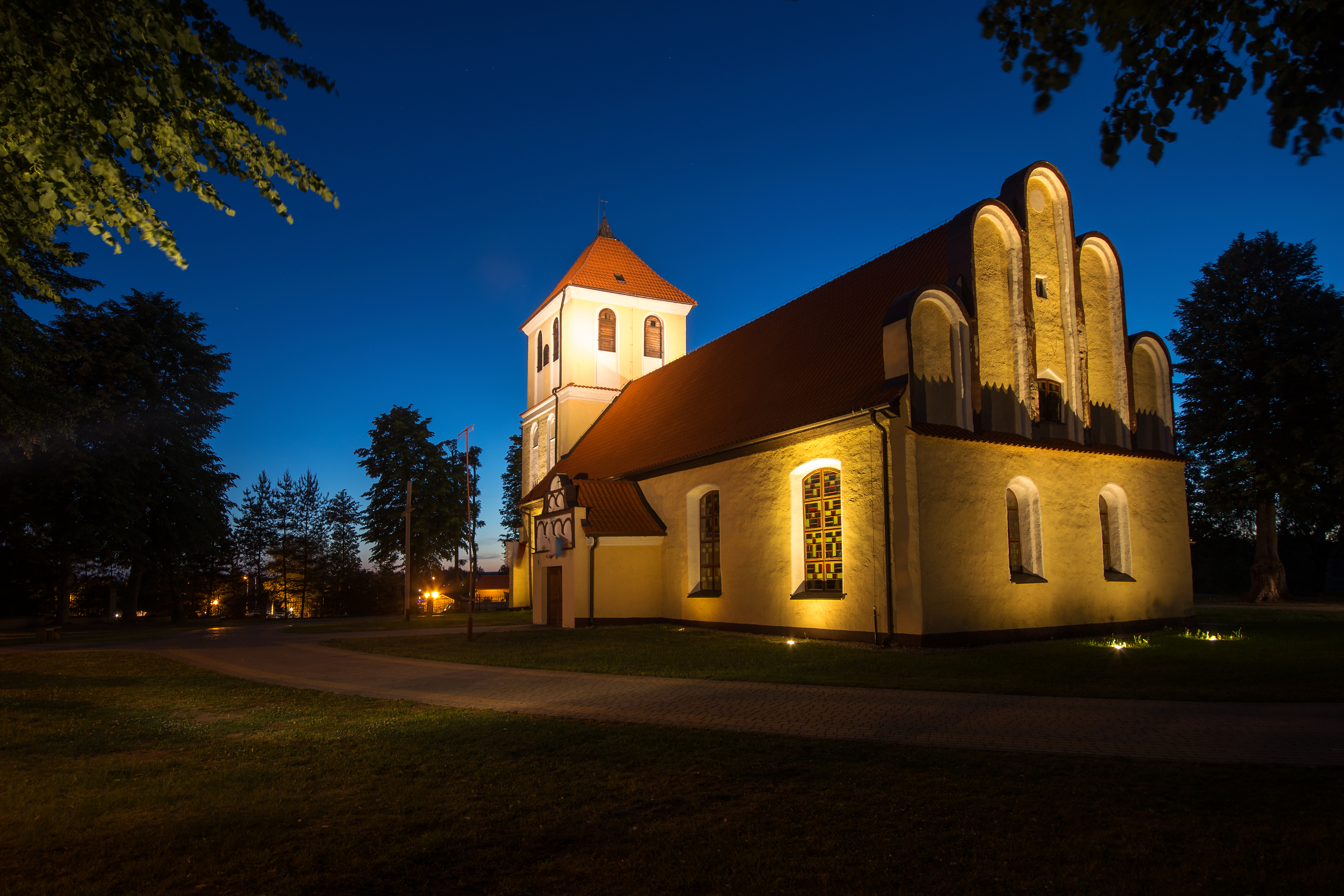
Saint Andrew Bobola church in Rydzewo

The gmina covers an area of 169.43 square kilometres (65.4 sq mi), and as of 2006 its total population is 3,861.

== Villages ==
Gmina Miłki contains the villages and settlements of Bielskie, Borki, Czyprki, Danowo, Jagodne Małe, Jagodne Wielkie, Jedamki, Kąp, Kleszczewo, Kleszczewo-Osada, Konopki Małe, Konopki Wielkie, Lipińskie, Lipowy Dwór, Marcinowa Wola, Miechy, Miłki, Paprotki, Przykop, Ruda, Rydzewo, Staświny, Staświny-Osada, Wierciejki and Wyszowate.

== Neighbouring gminas ==
Gmina Miłki is bordered by the gminas of Giżycko, Mikołajki, Orzysz, Ryn and Wydminy.
