= Bystry =

Bystry (Russian: Быстрый; masculine), Bystraya (Быстрая; feminine), or Bystroye (Быстрое; neuter) is the name of several inhabited localities in Russia:

- Bystry, Chukotka Autonomous Okrug, an urban locality (urban-type settlement) in Chukotka Autonomous Okrug; currently in the process of being liquidated
- Bystry, name of several rural localities
- Bystraya, Oryol Oblast, a rural locality (a village) in Oryol Oblast
- Bystraya, Tyumen Oblast, a rural locality (a village) in Tyumen Oblast
- Bystroye, Kaluga Oblast, a rural locality (a selo) in Kaluga Oblast
- Bystroye, name of several other rural localities
