= Bogaczewo, Giżycko County =

Bogaczewo
- Village
- Location within Poland
- Coordinates: 53°58′N 21°44′E
- Country: Poland
- Voivodeship: Warmian-Masurian
- County: Giżycko
- Gmina: Giżycko

Bogaczewo [bɔɡaˈt͡ʂɛvɔ] is a village in the administrative district of Gmina Giżycko, within Giżycko County, Warmian-Masurian Voivodeship, in northern Poland.
