= Giżycko County =

Giżycko County Powiat giżycki
- County
- Flag Coat of arms

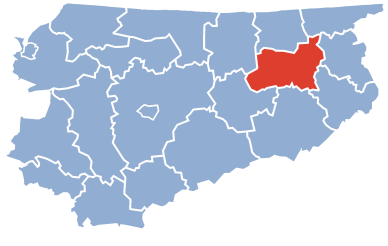
- Location within the voivodeship

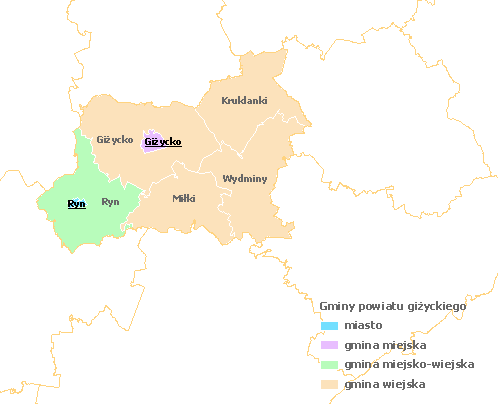
- Division into gminas
- Coordinates (Giżycko): 54°2′N 21°46′E
- Country: Poland
- Voivodeship: Warmian-Masurian
- Seat: Giżycko
- Gminas: Total 6 (incl. 1 urban): Giżycko; Gmina Giżycko; Gmina Kruklanki; Gmina Miłki; Gmina Ryn; Gmina Wydminy

Area
  - Total: 1,118.74 km^{2} (431.95 sq mi)

Population (2019)
  - Total: 56,661
  - Density: 50.647/km^{2} (131.18/sq mi)
  - Urban: 32,186
  - Rural: 24,475
- Car plates: NGI
- Website: www.gizycko.starostwo.gov.pl

Giżycko County (Polish: powiat giżycki) is a unit of territorial administration and local government (powiat) in Warmian-Masurian Voivodeship, northern Poland. It came into being on 1 January 1999, as a result of the Polish local government reforms of 1998. Its administrative seat and largest town is Giżycko, which lies 88 kilometres (55 mi) east of the regional capital Olsztyn. The only other town in the county is Ryn, lying 18 km (11 mi) south-west of Giżycko.

The county covers an area of 1,118.74 square kilometres (431.9 sq mi). As of 2019 its total population is 56,661, out of which the population of Giżycko is 29,335, that of Ryn is 2,851, and the rural population is 24,475.

Until 2002 Giżycko County also included the three gminas which now form Węgorzewo County.

== Neighbouring counties ==
Giżycko County is bordered by Węgorzewo County to the north, Gołdap County to the north-east, Olecko County and Ełk County to the east, Pisz County to the south, and Mrągowo County and Kętrzyn County to the west.

== Administrative divisions ==
The county is subdivided into six gminas (one urban, one urban-rural and four rural). These are listed in the following table, in descending order of population.

Gmina	Type	Area (km^{2})	Population (2019)	Seat
Giżycko	urban	13.9	29,335	
Gmina Giżycko	rural	289.8	8,464	Giżycko *
Gmina Wydminy	rural	233.5	6,270	Wydminy
Gmina Ryn	urban-rural	211.2	5,686	Ryn
Gmina Miłki	rural	169.4	3,742	Miłki
Gmina Kruklanki	rural	201.0	3,164	Kruklanki
* seat not part of the gmina
