= Forests of Poland =

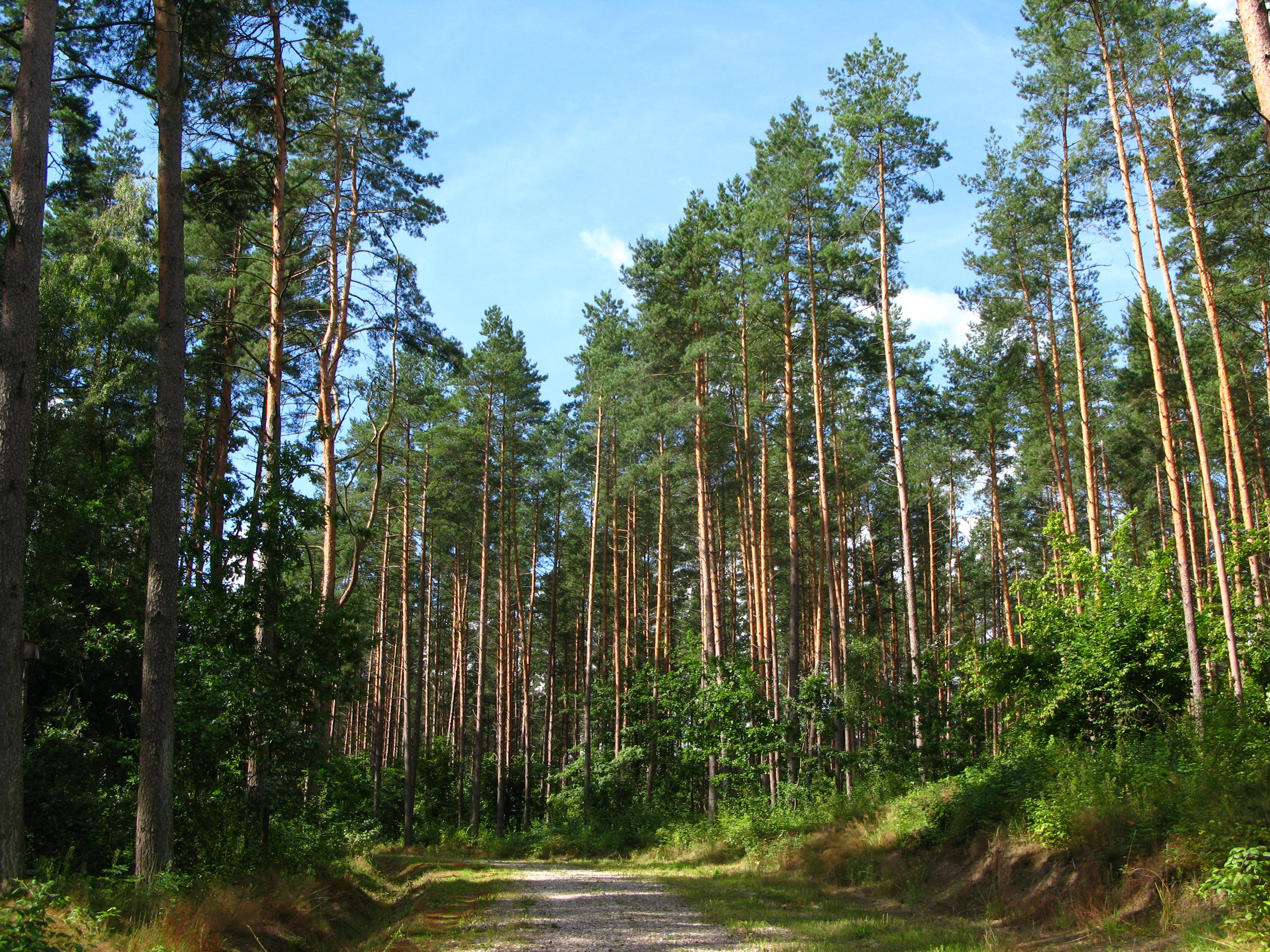
Dominant tree species in Poland is Scots pine - Pinus sylvestris with 58% share.

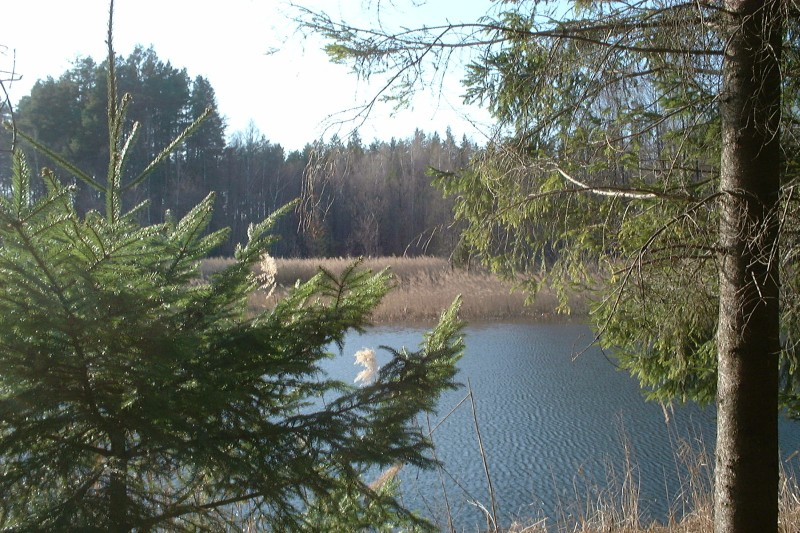
Perkuć Reserve in Puszcza Augustowska

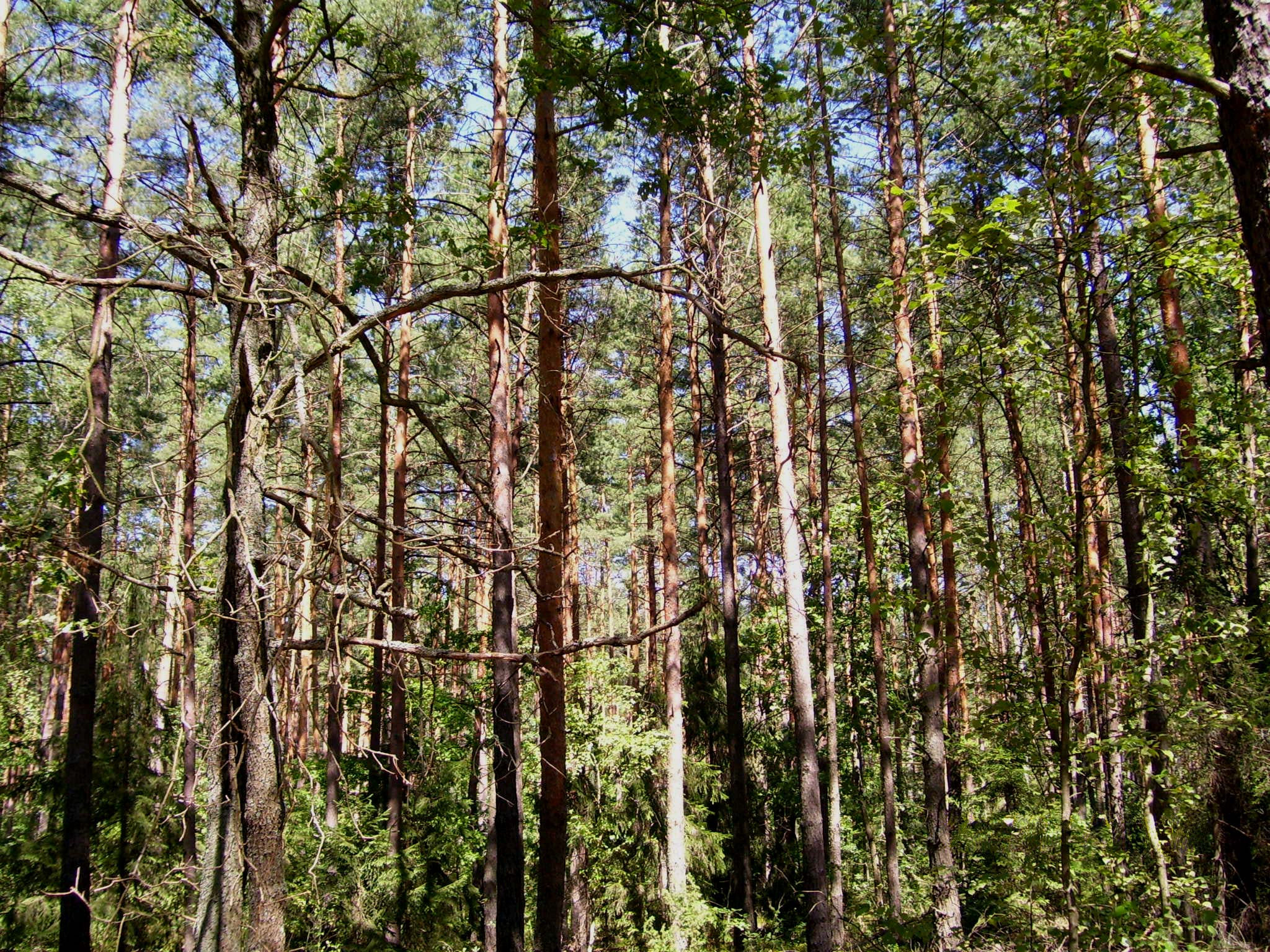
Puszcza Biała (The White Forest) of Masovia

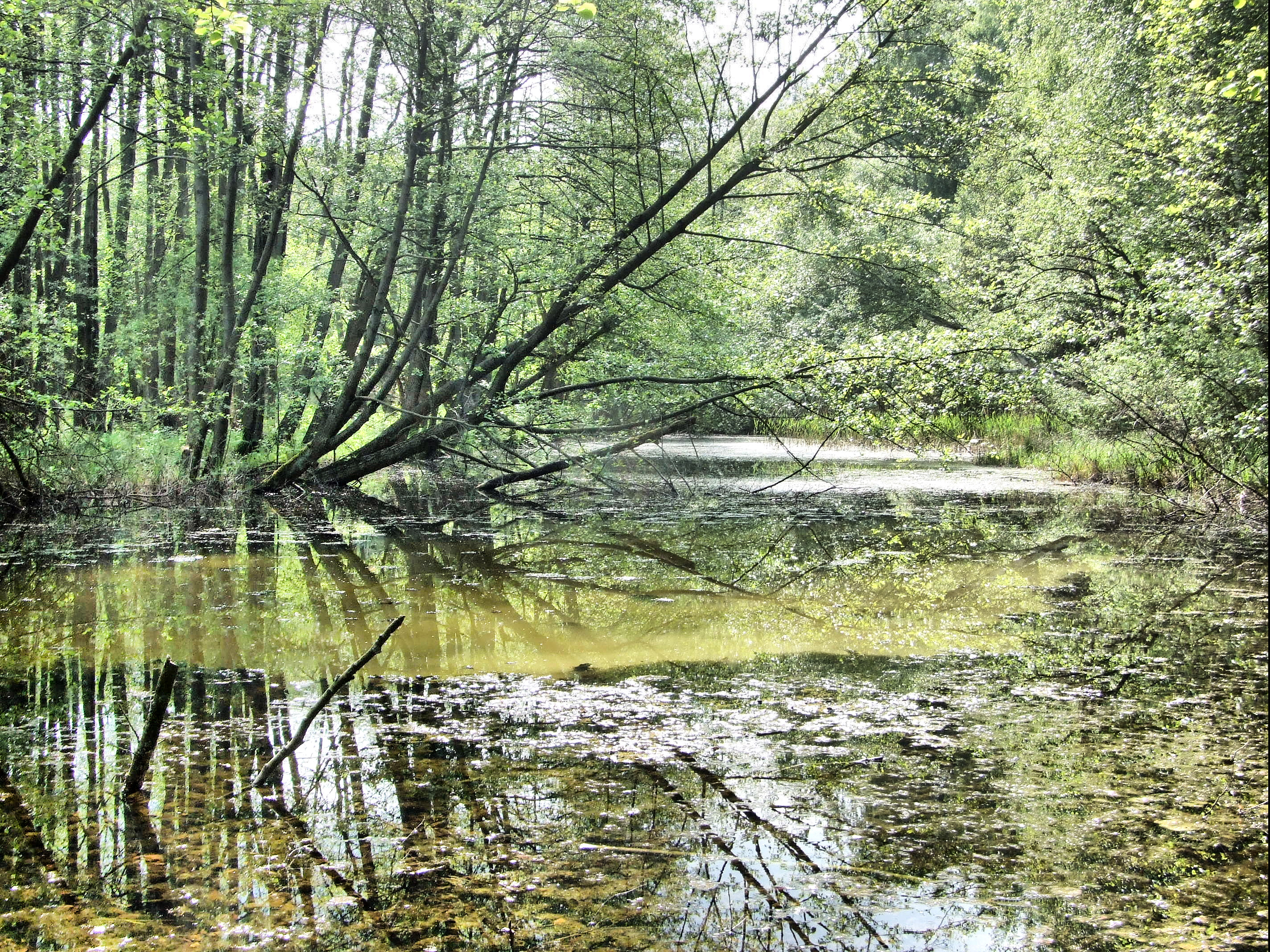
Polish part of Wkrzańska Heath near Szczecin and neighboring county town, Police

Forests cover an estimated 29.3% of Poland's territory, and are mostly owned by the state, and are increasing at a fast rate, by 2030 Polish forest percentage is to be 33%. Western and northern parts of Poland as well as the Carpathian Mountains in the extreme south, are much more forested than eastern and central provinces. The most forested administrative districts of the country are: Lubusz Voivodeship (49,5%), Subcarpathian Voivodeship (38,4%), and West Pomeranian Voivodeship (35,9%). The least forested are: Łódź Voivodeship (21,4%), Masovian Voivodeship (23,4%), and Lublin Voivodeship (23,5%).

== History ==
=== Ancient history ===
Poland in its ancient history was a deeply forested country. However, as its settled population increased, with it, agricultural and other needs, much of the forests were cut down, plummeting the share of virgin forests to single digit percentages.

=== Medieval history ===
The forests of medieval Poland contributed high quality oak timber to commercial trade throughout the Baltic region. Major trade centers for Polish timber included Danzig and Amsterdam.

=== Contemporary history ===
At the end of the 18th century, forests covered around 40% of Poland. However, due to the 19th century economic exploitation during the partitions of Poland, as well as, the Nazi German and Soviet occupations between 1939–1945 with trees shipped to battle fronts across Europe, deforestation and slash and burn conditions of war shrank Polish forests to only 21% of total area of the country (as of 1946). Furthermore, rich deciduous trees were replaced with fast growing coniferous trees of lesser value meant for commerce, such as pine. After World War II, the government of Poland initiated the National Plan of Afforestation. By 1970, forests covered 29% of the country. As of 2009 – 29,1% of Poland's territory was forested, amounting to 9,088,000 hectares. It is estimated that by 2050, the total area of forested land should increase to 33%.

As much as 81,8% of the Polish forests are state-owned, majority (77,8%) by Polish State Forests (Lasy Państwowe), 2% constitute Polish National Forests protected zones, 2% are owned by other governmental entities (such as local self-government or the Agricultural Property Agency) and 18,2% belong to private owners. The high percentage of Polish forests owned by the state is the result of nationalization of forests that occurred in the aftermath of World War II when Poland became a communist state (People's Republic of Poland) under the Soviet sphere of influence.

== Inhabitation ==
Forest in Poland occupy the poorest soil. Coniferous type accounts for 54.5% (with the absolute dominance of Scots pine - Pinus sylvestris), whereas broadleaved type accounts for 45.5% (out of that, alder and riparian forests account for 3.8%). A number of forested zones are now protected by the Polish government and, in many cases, they have become tourist destinations. Over the years, many of the largest Polish forests have been reduced in size, and that reflected on the structure of forest inhabitation.

Up until the end of the 18th Century, beginning in what is known as the Middle Ages, forests were considered places for travellers and ordinary folk to stay away from, as they were home to bandits and were believed to be inhabited by evil spirits. Law and order did not apply to forests for many centuries, except for self-policing observed and administered by their inhabitants. However, the forests did contain numerous woodsmen and their families who made the best of their remote environment. These woodsmen lived on what the forest could produce, collecting pitch resin for sale – important as method of illuminating city streets – logging construction lumber, collecting lime, beeswax, honey, hops, mushrooms and whatever other saleable items could be harvested in the forest and sold in villages outside of it.

Families of the woodsmen produced their own food through gardening and hunting, as well as their own clothing. In some cases, their sewing of intricate laces became well known outside the forest, resulting in additional family income. Because of their isolation from society in general, woodsmen and their families developed their own style of dress, music, sewing, dialect, celebrations, and the type of dwellings. The Masovia woodsmen for example, known as Kurpie people, who lived in the forested region known in Poland as the White Wilderness (Puszcza Biała) and the Green Wilderness, still proudly proclaim and celebrate their unique culture and customs.

== Tree composition ==
- Pine – 58,1% (European red pine)
- Oak – 7,7%
- Birch – 7,3%
- Spruce – 6,2% (Norway spruce)
- Beech – 5,9% (European beech)
- Alder – 5,7%
- other broadleaf – 4,9%
- other coniferous – 4,2%

Data as of 2016.

== List of Polish forest complexes ==
A

- Puszcza Augustowska (Augustów Primeval Forest)

B

- Puszcza Biała (White Wilderness or White Forest)
- Białowieża Forest, UNESCO World Heritage Site
- Puszcza Borecka (Borki's Forest) near Borki
- Puszcza Bukowa (Beech Forest) near Szczecin
- Puszcza Bydgoska (Bydgoszcz Forest) near Bydgoszcz

D

- Bory Dolnośląskie (Lower Silesian Wilderness)

J

- Lasy Janowskie (Janów Forest Landscape Park)

K

- Puszcza Kampinoska (Kampinos Forest)
- Knyszyn Forest (Knyszyń Forest Landscape Park)
- Krajna, part of Greater Poland Voivodeship
- Puszcza Kurpiowska, collective name of Puszcza Biała and Puszcza Zielona.

Ł

- Lasy Łukowskie (Łuków Forest)
- Loda (Loda Forest)

=== M ===
- Lasy Mazurskie (Masurian Forests)

N

- Puszcza Niepołomicka (Niepołomice Forest)
- Puszcza Notecka (Notec Forest) near the Lubuskie Lake District.

O

- Oliwa forests in the Gdańsk district.

P

- Puszcza Piaskowa (Piasek Forest) in the Odra valley near Cedynia.
- Puszcza Piska (Pisz Forest)
- Pomeranian Forest
- Las Prudnicki (Prudnik Forest)

R

- Puszcza Romincka (Romincka Forest)

S

- Las Szpęgawski (Szpęgawski Forest)

T

- Bory Tucholskie (Tuchola Forest) in the Pomeranian Lake District.

U

- Ueckermünder Heide (Puszcza Wkrzańska) shared by Germany and Poland

W

- Puszcza Wkrzańska (Ueckermünder Heide)

Z

- Puszcza Zielona (Green Wilderness)
- Puszcza Zielonka (Puszcza Zielonka Landscape Park)
