= Coleophora amiculella =

Scientific classification
- Kingdom: Animalia
- Phylum: Arthropoda
- Class: Insecta
- Order: Lepidoptera
- Family: Coleophoridae
- Genus: Coleophora
- Species: C. amiculella

Binomial name
- Coleophora amiculella Toll, 1956

Species of moth

Coleophora amiculella is a moth of the family Coleophoridae that can be found in Algeria and Tunisia.

Larvae possibly feed on Trifolium species.
