= Coleophora xanthoptera =

Scientific classification
- Kingdom: Animalia
- Phylum: Arthropoda
- Class: Insecta
- Order: Lepidoptera
- Family: Coleophoridae
- Genus: Coleophora
- Species: C. xanthoptera

Binomial name
- Coleophora xanthoptera Toll, 1952

Species of moth

Coleophora xanthoptera is a moth of the family Coleophoridae. It is found in Algeria.
