= Coleophora parenthella =

Scientific classification
- Kingdom: Animalia
- Phylum: Arthropoda
- Clade: Pancrustacea
- Class: Insecta
- Order: Lepidoptera
- Family: Coleophoridae
- Genus: Coleophora
- Species: C. parenthella

Binomial name
- Coleophora parenthella Toll, 1952

Species of moth

Coleophora parenthella is a moth of the family Coleophoridae. It is found in Ukraine and China.
