= Coleophora fuscopictella =

Scientific classification
- Kingdom: Animalia
- Phylum: Arthropoda
- Class: Insecta
- Order: Lepidoptera
- Family: Coleophoridae
- Genus: Coleophora
- Species: C. fuscopictella

Binomial name
- Coleophora fuscopictella Toll, 1957

Species of moth

Coleophora fuscopictella is a moth of the family Coleophoridae that is endemic to Tunisia.
