= Jurkowo =

Jurkowo may refer to the following places:

- Jurkowo, Greater Poland Voivodeship (west-central Poland)
- Jurkowo, Kuyavian-Pomeranian Voivodeship (north-central Poland)
- Jurkowo, Giżycko County, Warmian-Masurian Voivodeship (north Poland)
- Jurkowo, Olecko County, Warmian-Masurian Voivodeship (north Poland)
