= Coleophora pseudodirectella =

Scientific classification
- Kingdom: Animalia
- Phylum: Arthropoda
- Class: Insecta
- Order: Lepidoptera
- Family: Coleophoridae
- Genus: Coleophora
- Species: C. pseudodirectella

Binomial name
- Coleophora pseudodirectella Toll, 1959

Species of moth endemic to Poland

Coleophora pseudodirectella is a moth of the family Coleophoridae. It is found only in Poland.
