= Coleophora hololeucella =

Scientific classification
- Kingdom: Animalia
- Phylum: Arthropoda
- Class: Insecta
- Order: Lepidoptera
- Family: Coleophoridae
- Genus: Coleophora
- Species: C. hololeucella

Binomial name
- Coleophora hololeucella Toll, 1952

Synonyms
- Coleophora punica Baldizzone, 1985

Species of moth

Coleophora hololeucella is a moth of the family Coleophoridae. It is found in Algeria and Egypt.

The larvae feed on Atriplex parvifolia and Chenopodium species. They feed on the leaves and possibly also on the fruits of their host plant.
