= Wisliceny =

Wisliceny is a Slavic surname. Notable people with the surname include:

- Dieter Wisliceny (1911–1948), German SS officer and perpetrator of the Holocaust executed for war crimes
- Günther-Eberhardt Wisliceny (1912–1985), German SS officer
