= Coleophora weymarni =

Scientific classification
- Kingdom: Animalia
- Phylum: Arthropoda
- Class: Insecta
- Order: Lepidoptera
- Family: Coleophoridae
- Genus: Coleophora
- Species: C. weymarni

Binomial name
- Coleophora weymarni Toll, 1942

Species of moth

Coleophora weymarni is a moth of the family Coleophoridae. It is found in China (Manchuria).
