= Puszcza Zielona =

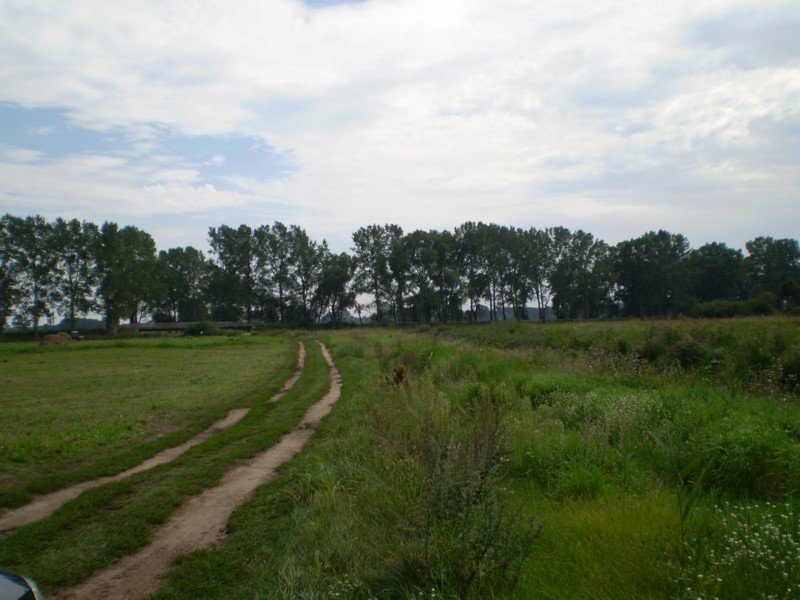
- Today’s remnants of a Kurpie forest

- Location within Poland
- Interactive map of Puszcza Zielona

Geography
- Location: Masovian Voivodeship, Podlaskie Voivodeship, Poland
- Coordinates: 53°18′50.61″N 21°27′7.84″E

Puszcza Zielona (Polish: [ˈpuʂt͡ʂa ʑɛˈlɔna]; lit. 'Green Wilderness') is a forest in Poland which extends from the Narew River and the border with the region of Masuria. It is bounded on the east by the Pisa River and on the west by the Orzyc River. The forest lies in a lowland and contains a wet sandy soil, but it is rich in various minerals which are mined.

The Green Wilderness (Puszcza Zielona) is usually associated with the White Wilderness (Puszcza Biała), and together the two forests are often referred to as the Kurpie Forest (Puszcza Kurpiowska) because the two forests were populated by inhabitants who, over the centuries retained their distinct ethnic character. Due to isolation they developed a unique culture of their own, called Kurpie.

== History ==
The forest was first ordered colonized by Duke Janusz I of Warsaw in the first half of the 14th century by peasants and petty nobles. Colonization continued on and off subsequently, and its inhabitants, because of their isolation by living deep in a forest, developed a distinct culture. Other neighboring Poles gave them the name of kurpś, because they retained their ancient tradition of making shoes made of fibers from the linden tree and sealed with lime.

== Current status ==
Because of deliberate cutting down of forest, even though the area is not suitable for agriculture, much of the forest remains in broken patches. Villages which once housed Kurpie-style structures have now been replaced, for the most part, by more modern structures.

After the Fall of Communism, portions of the forest are being preserved and protected as nature preserves by the Polish government.

== Nature preserves pertaining to Puszcza Zielona ==
- Rezerwat Czarnia
- Rezerwat Kaniston
- Rezerwat przyrody Ciemny Kąt
- Rezerwat przyrody Łokieć

== See also ==
- Polish forests
- Puszcza Kurpiowska
- Puszcza Biała
- Kurpie
