= Coleophora hadrocerella =

Scientific classification
- Kingdom: Animalia
- Phylum: Arthropoda
- Class: Insecta
- Order: Lepidoptera
- Family: Coleophoridae
- Genus: Coleophora
- Species: C. hadrocerella

Binomial name
- Coleophora hadrocerella Toll, 1952

Species of moth

Coleophora hadrocerella is a moth of the family Coleophoridae. It is found in Tunisia and Libya.

The larvae feed on Bassia muricata species. They feed on the stem of their host plant.
