= Coleophora gerasimovi =

Scientific classification
- Kingdom: Animalia
- Phylum: Arthropoda
- Class: Insecta
- Order: Lepidoptera
- Family: Coleophoridae
- Genus: Coleophora
- Species: C. gerasimovi

Binomial name
- Coleophora gerasimovi Toll, 1961

Species of moth

Coleophora gerasimovi is a moth of the family Coleophoridae. It is found in Turkestan.

The larvae feed on Amygdalus bucharica. They feed on the leaves of their host plant.
