= Coleophora parvella =

Scientific classification
- Kingdom: Animalia
- Phylum: Arthropoda
- Class: Insecta
- Order: Lepidoptera
- Family: Coleophoridae
- Genus: Coleophora
- Species: C. parvella

Binomial name
- Coleophora parvella Toll, 1942

Species of moth

Coleophora parvella is a moth of the family Coleophoridae that is endemic to Palestine.
