= Coleophora impalella =

Scientific classification
- Kingdom: Animalia
- Phylum: Arthropoda
- Class: Insecta
- Order: Lepidoptera
- Family: Coleophoridae
- Genus: Coleophora
- Species: C. impalella

Binomial name
- Coleophora impalella Toll, 1961

Species of moth

Coleophora impalella is a moth of the family Coleophoridae. It is found in Hungary and southern Russia (Middle and Lower Volga).

The larvae possibly feed on Aster species.
