= Coleophora arenicola =

Scientific classification
- Kingdom: Animalia
- Phylum: Arthropoda
- Class: Insecta
- Order: Lepidoptera
- Family: Coleophoridae
- Genus: Coleophora
- Species: C. arenicola

Binomial name
- Coleophora arenicola Toll, 1952

Species of moth

Coleophora arenicola is a moth of the family Coleophoridae that is endemic to Algeria.

The larvae feed on Hedysarum multijugum. They feed on the generative organs of their host plant.
