= Coleophora klimeschiella =

Russian thistle casebearer

Scientific classification
- Kingdom: Animalia
- Phylum: Arthropoda
- Class: Insecta
- Order: Lepidoptera
- Family: Coleophoridae
- Genus: Coleophora
- Species: C. klimeschiella

Binomial name
- Coleophora klimeschiella Toll, 1952

Species of moth

The Russian thistle casebearer (Coleophora klimeschiella) is a moth of the family Coleophoridae. It is native to Asia Minor and central Asia, but has been introduced to California, Texas and Hawaii.

The larvae feed on the foliage of Salsola australis.

== Gallery ==
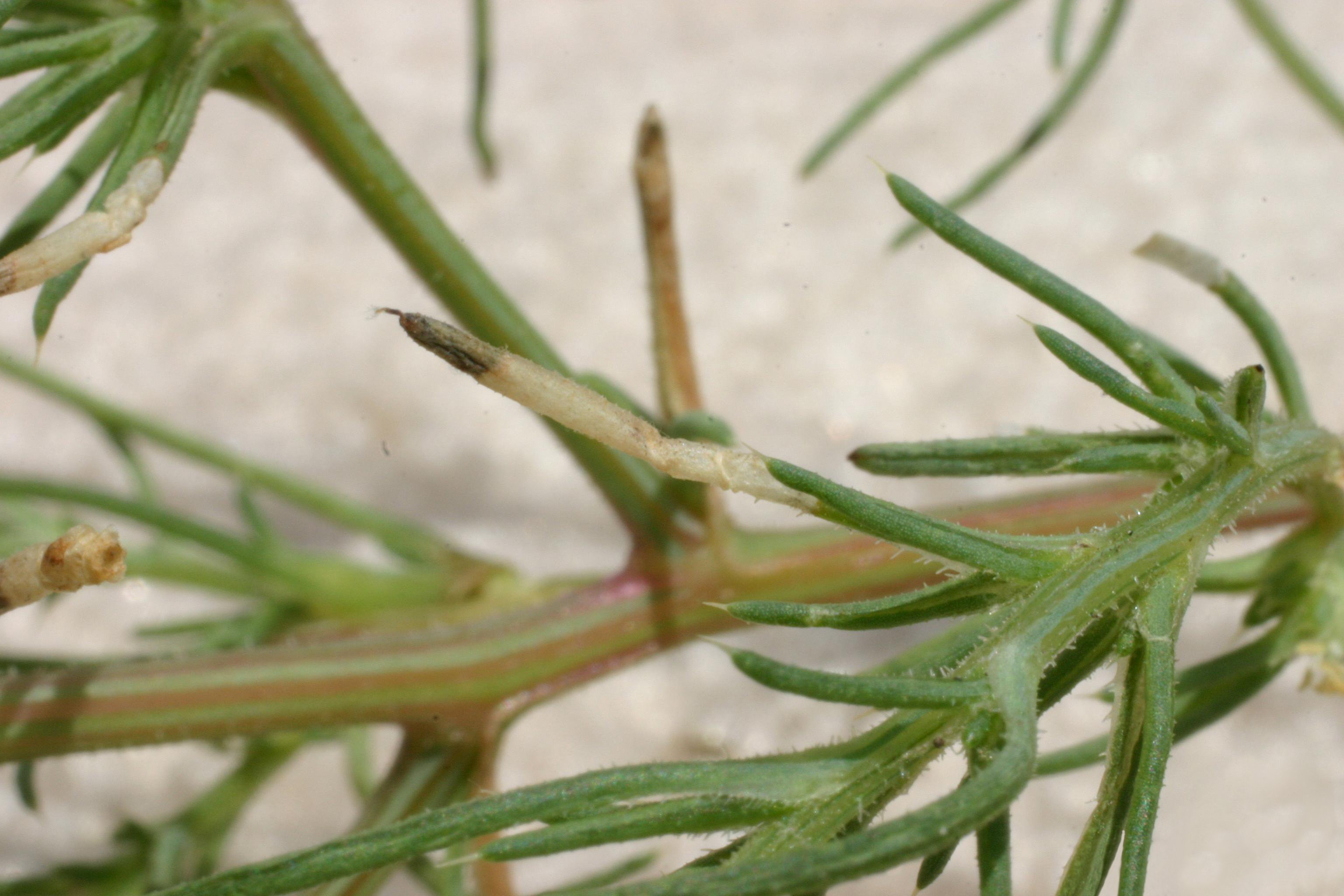

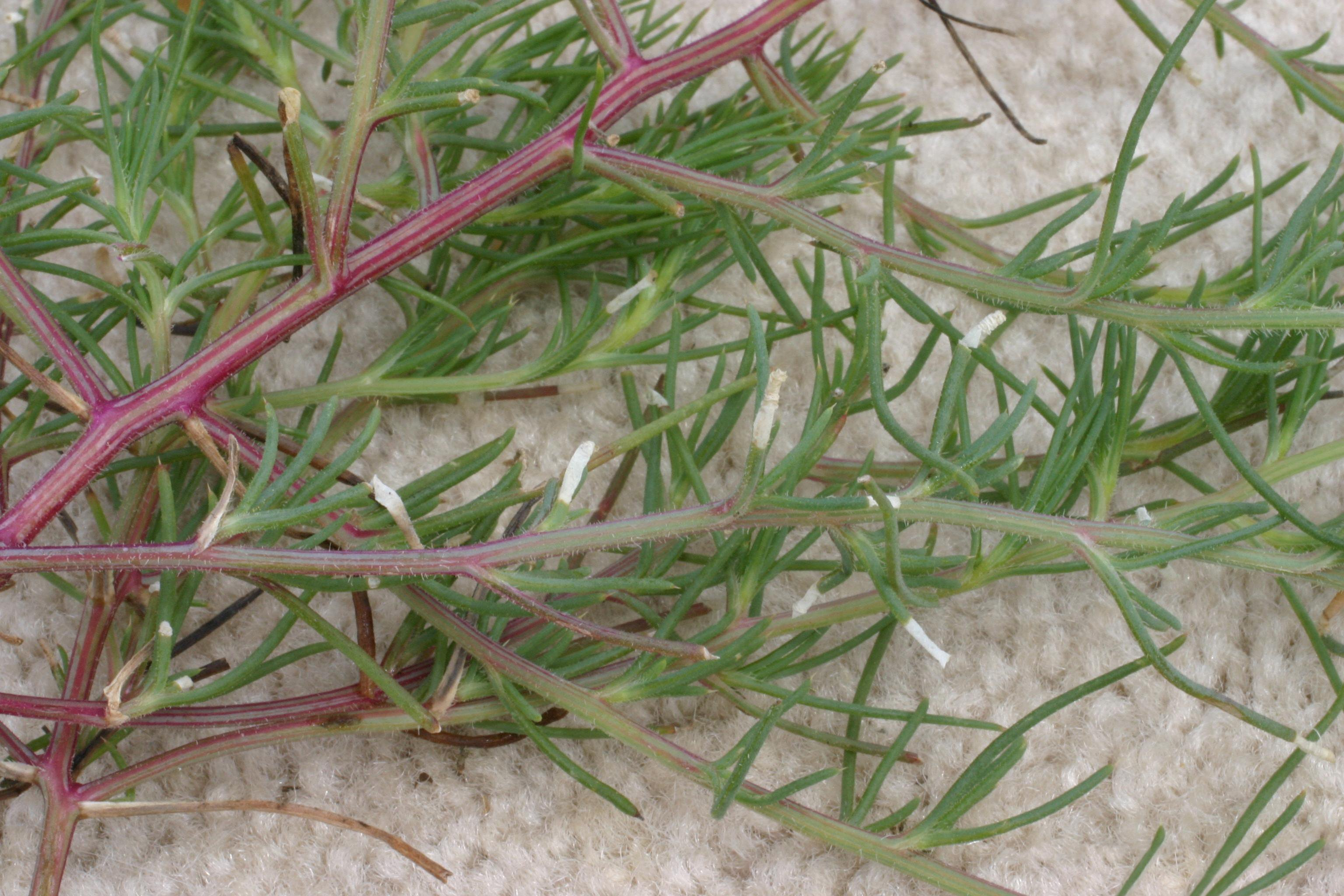

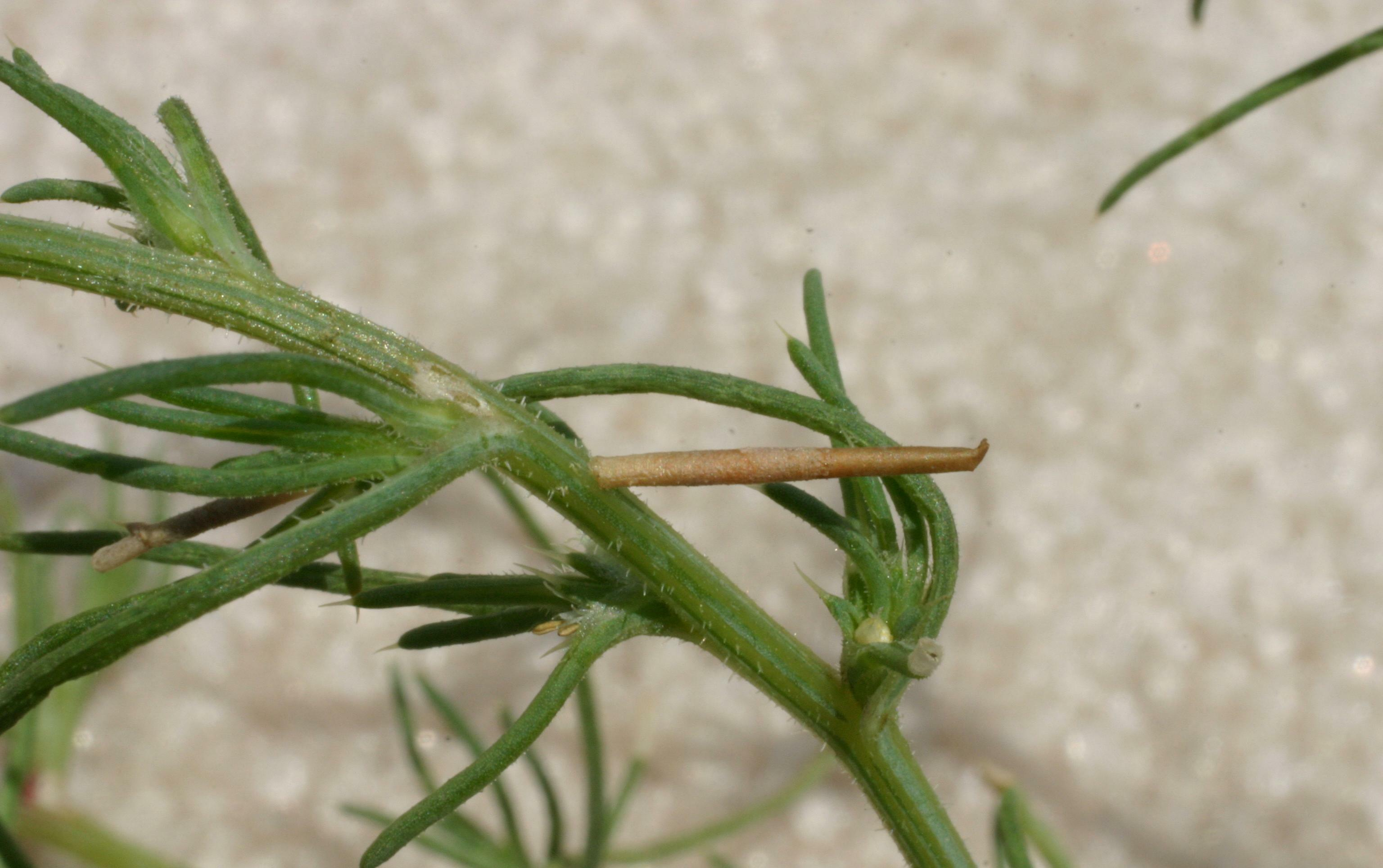
