= Boćwinka =

Boćwinka refers to the following places in Poland:

- Boćwinka, Giżycko County
- Boćwinka, Gmina Gołdap
