= Coleophora syriaca =

Scientific classification
- Kingdom: Animalia
- Phylum: Arthropoda
- Class: Insecta
- Order: Lepidoptera
- Family: Coleophoridae
- Genus: Coleophora
- Species: C. syriaca

Binomial name
- Coleophora syriaca Toll, 1942

Species of moth

Coleophora syriaca is a moth of the family Coleophoridae. It is found in Syria.
