= Coleophora fuscoaenea =

Scientific classification
- Kingdom: Animalia
- Phylum: Arthropoda
- Class: Insecta
- Order: Lepidoptera
- Family: Coleophoridae
- Genus: Coleophora
- Species: C. fuscoaenea

Binomial name
- Coleophora fuscoaenea Toll, 1952

Species of moth

Coleophora fuscoaenea is a moth of the family Coleophoridae. It is found in Israel and Egypt.

The length of the forewings is 6.5–9 mm for males and 6–7 mm for females. Adults are on wing from March to April.
