= Jasieniec, Warmian-Masurian Voivodeship =

Jasieniec
- Village
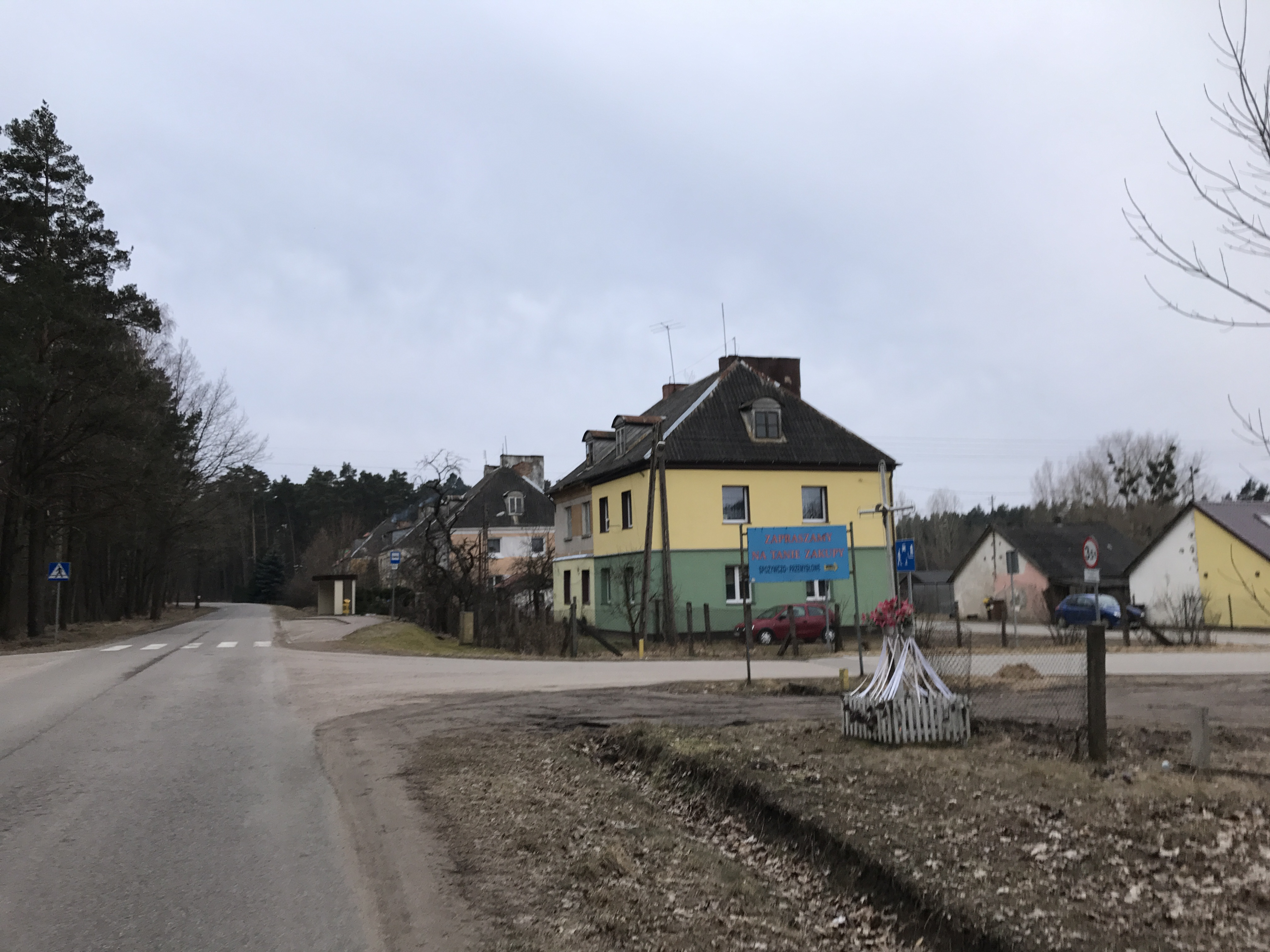
- Street in Jasiniec

- Location within Poland
- Coordinates: 54°07′31″N 21°58′24″E
- Country: Poland
- Voivodeship: Warmian-Masurian
- County: Giżycko
- Gmina: Kruklanki

Jasieniec [jaˈɕɛɲɛt͡s] is a village in the administrative district of Gmina Kruklanki, within Giżycko County, Warmian-Masurian Voivodeship, in northern Poland.
