= Gmina Kruklanki =

Gmina Kruklanki Kruklanki Commune
- Gmina
- Coat of arms
- Interactive map of Gmina Kruklanki
- Coordinates (Kruklanki): 54°5′18″N 21°55′21″E
- Country: Poland
- Voivodeship: Warmian-Masurian
- County: Giżycko
- Seat: Kruklanki

Area
  - Total: 201.01 km^{2} (77.61 sq mi)

Population (2006)
  - Total: 3,028
  - Density: 15.06/km^{2} (39.02/sq mi)
- Website: http://www.kruklanki.pl

Gmina Kruklanki is a rural gmina (administrative district) in Giżycko County, Warmian-Masurian Voivodeship, in northern Poland. Its seat is the village of Kruklanki, which lies approximately 12 kilometres (7 mi) north-east of Giżycko and 100 km (62 mi) east of the regional capital Olsztyn.

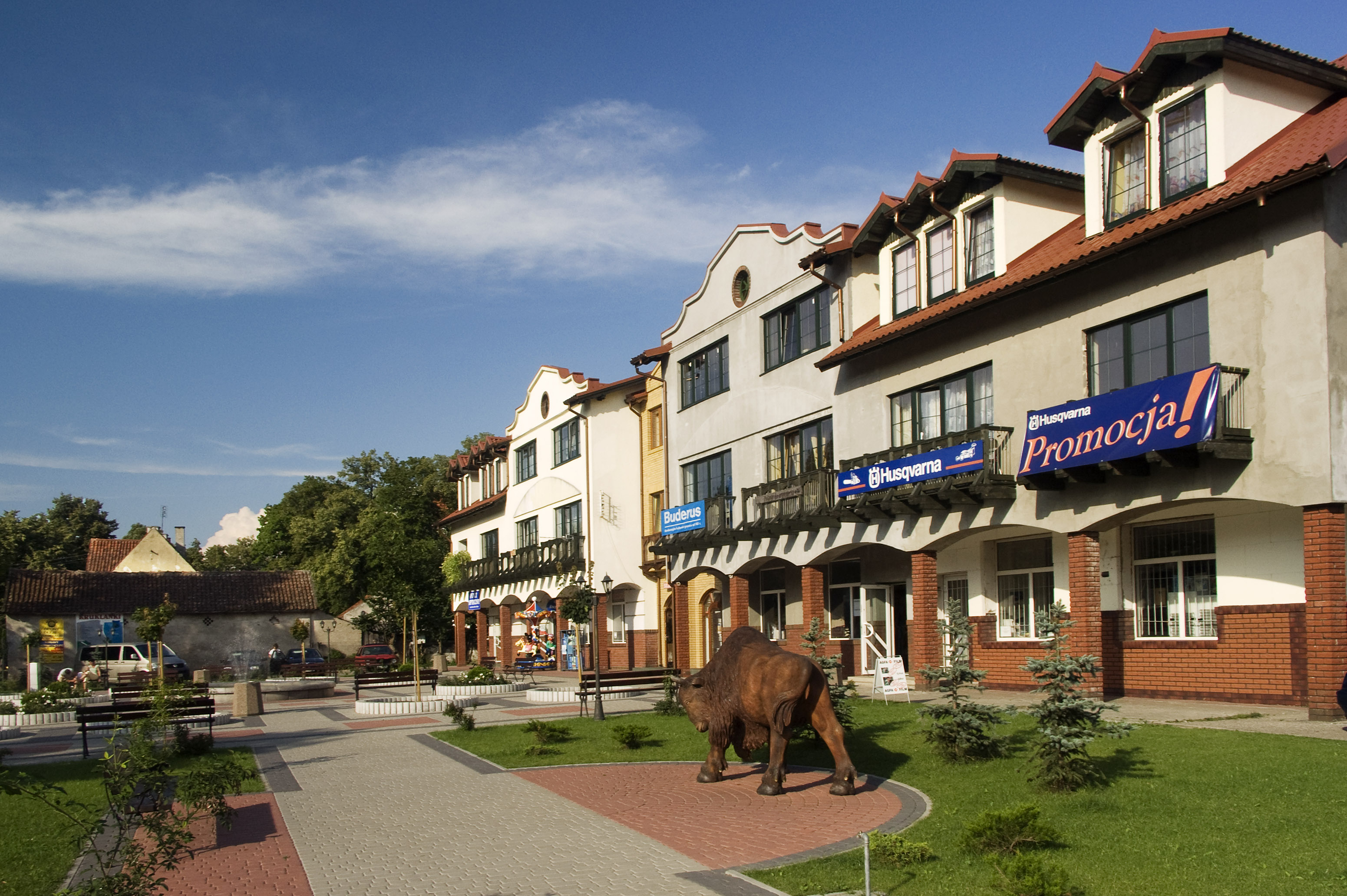

The gmina covers an area of 201.01 square kilometres (77.6 sq mi), and as of 2006 its total population is 3,028.

== Villages ==
Gmina Kruklanki contains the villages and settlements of Boćwinka, Borki, Brożówka, Budziska Leśne, Chmielewo, Czarcia Góra, Grądy Kruklaneckie, Jasieniec, Jeziorowskie, Jurkowo, Kamienna Struga, Knieja Łuczańska, Kruklanki, Lipowo, Majerka, Możdżany, Podleśne, Sołtmany, Wolisko, Żabinka, Żywki, Żywki Małe and Żywy.

== Neighbouring gminas ==
Gmina Kruklanki is bordered by the gminas of Banie Mazurskie, Giżycko, Kowale Oleckie, Pozezdrze, Świętajno and Wydminy.
