= Żywy =

- Village
- Location within Poland
- Coordinates: 54°3′30″N 22°2′8″E
- Country: Poland
- Voivodeship: Warmian-Masurian
- County: Giżycko
- Gmina: Kruklanki
- Population: 170

Żywy [ˈʐɨvɨ] is a village in the administrative district of Gmina Kruklanki, within Giżycko County, Warmian-Masurian Voivodeship, in northern Poland.
