= Chmielewo, Giżycko County =

Chmielewo
- Settlement
- Location within Poland
- Coordinates: 54°04′44″N 21°58′38″E
- Country: Poland
- Voivodeship: Warmian-Masurian
- County: Giżycko
- Gmina: Kruklanki

Chmielewo [xmjɛˈlɛvɔ] is a settlement in the administrative district of Gmina Kruklanki, within Giżycko County, Warmian-Masurian Voivodeship, in northern Poland.
