= Puszcza Kurpiowska =

Kurpiowska Forest Polish: Puszcza Kurpiowska
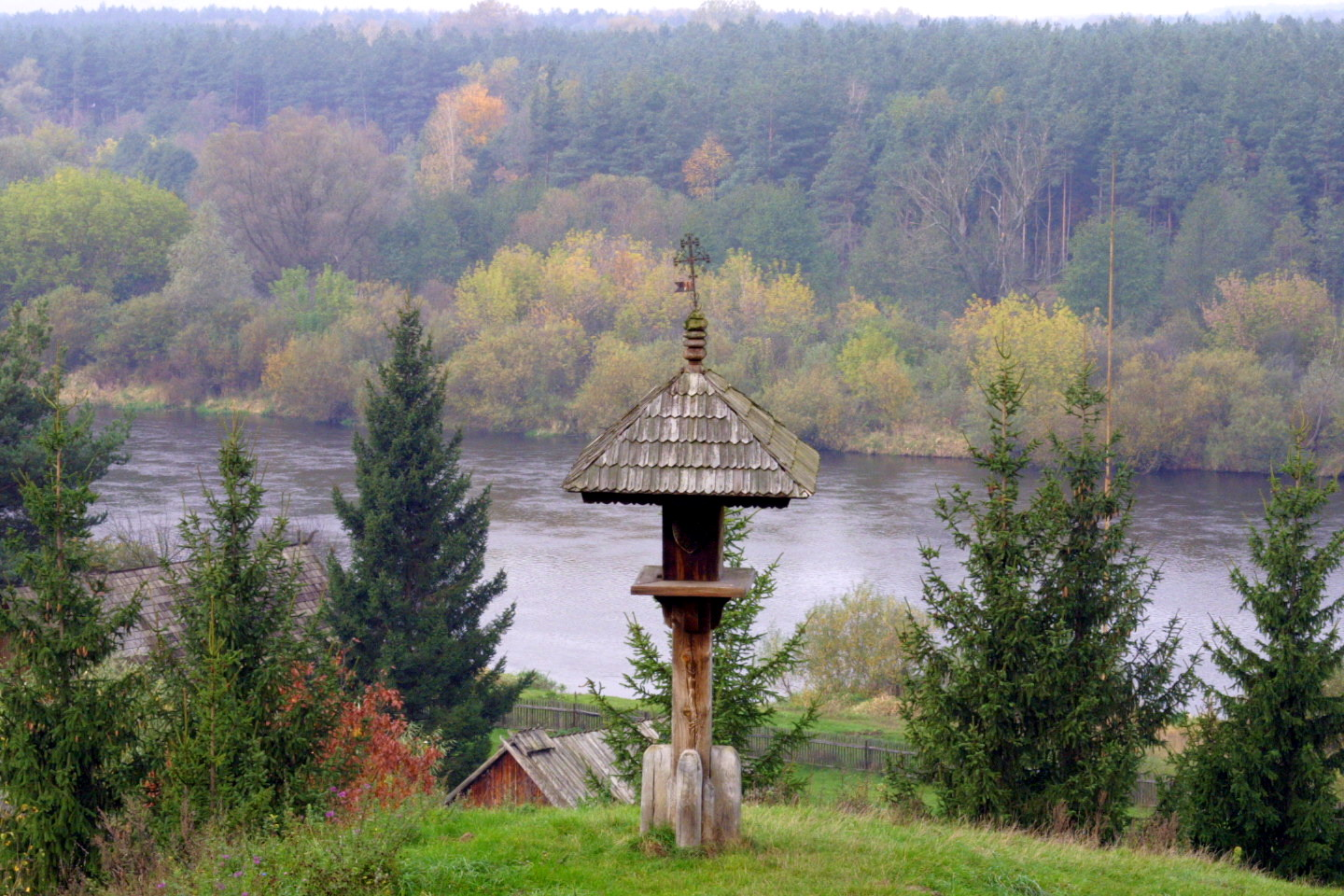
- View of Narew flowing through Puszcza Kurpiowska
- Interactive map of Kurpiowska Forest

Geography
- Location: Masovian Voivodeship, Podlaskie Voivodeship, Poland

Puszcza Kurpiowska or Kurpiowska Forest, (Polish pronunciation: [ˈpuʂt͡ʂa kurˈpjɔfska], also Kurpie Forest) is the collective name of Poland's two wilderness areas: Puszcza Biała and Puszcza Zielona (White and Green Forests), located in the central basin of Narew and Kurpiowska Plain. It is bound by the rivers: Pisa (east), Narew (south) and Orzyc (west). The north-end reaches the border with Masuria.

In the 16th century the Kurpiowska Forest was called Zagajnica, adding to its definition the counties of Łomża, Ostrołęka and Przasnysz, in which parts of the forest were located.

In the 18th century the term Kurpiowska Forest was extended to include the Green Forest (Polish: Puszcza Zielona) and White Forest (Polish: Puszcza Biała) which belonged to the Bishops of Płock. Kurpiowska Forest gradually began to be identified with Puszcza Zielona.

In the late 20th century, forested areas accounted for approximately 33% of the Kurpiowska Forest. Most (95%) of forest areas include pine, with sparse alder, spruce, oak and birch. The old-growth areas of spruce, pine and alder are protected.

== Reserves within the Forest ==
- Czarnia Reserve
- Kanistan Reserve
- Dark Angle "Ciemny Kąt"
- Elbow "Łokieć"
- Olsy Płoszyckie Reserve

== See also ==
- Polish forests
