= Sołtmany, Giżycko County =

Sołtmany
- Village
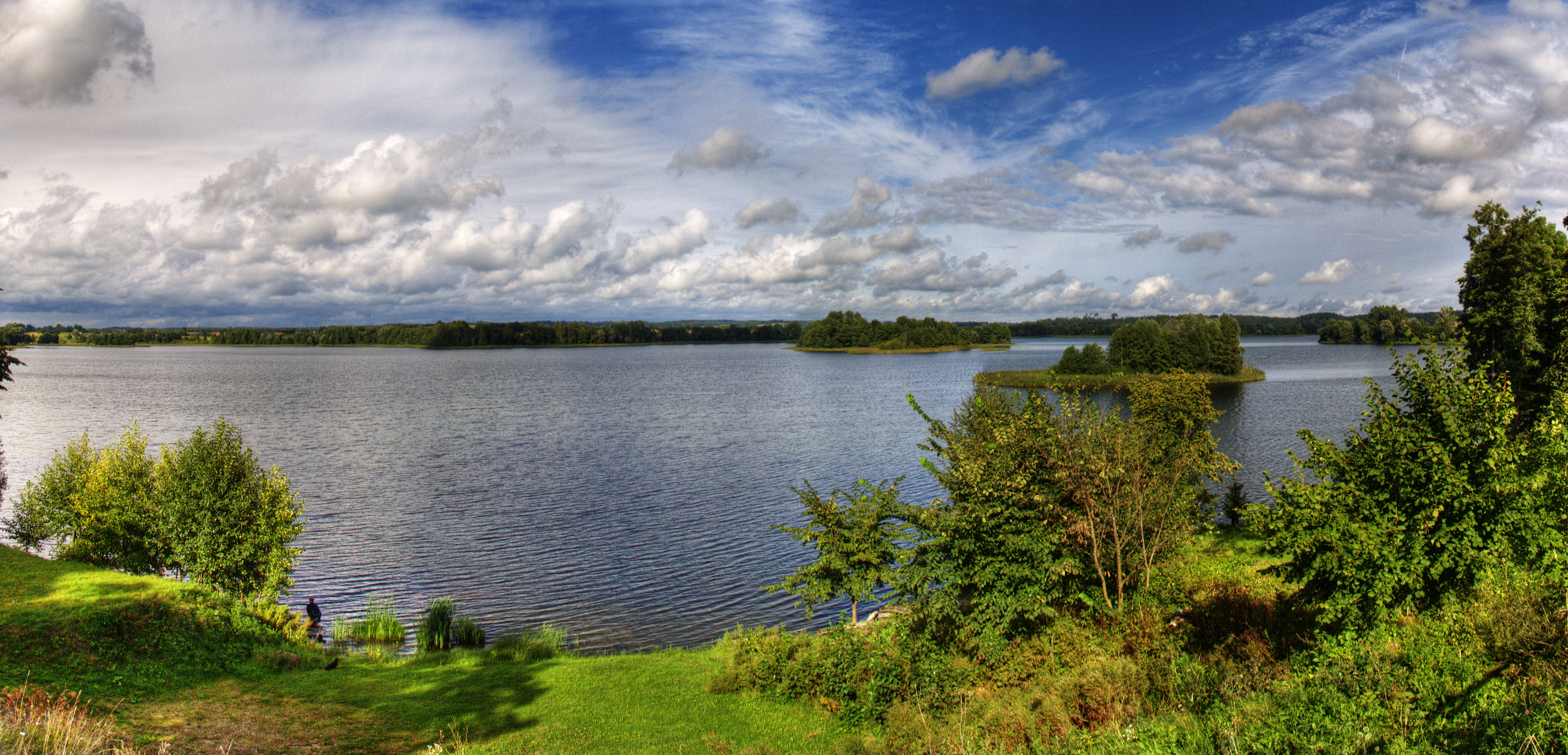
- Sołtmany Lake

- Location within Poland
- Coordinates: 54°2′29″N 22°1′18″E
- Country: Poland
- Voivodeship: Warmian-Masurian
- County: Giżycko
- Gmina: Kruklanki
- Founded: 1546
- Founder: Jan Sołtman and Paweł Sołtman
- Time zone: UTC+1 (CET)
  - Summer (DST): UTC+2 (CEST)
- Vehicle registration: NGI

Sołtmany [sɔu̯tˈmanɨ] is a village in the administrative district of Gmina Kruklanki, within Giżycko County, Warmian-Masurian Voivodeship, in northern Poland.

Sołtmany was founded in 1546 by brothers Jan and Paweł Sołtman.

On 30 April 2011, the place witnessed the fall of a stony meteorite.
