= Możdżany =

- Village
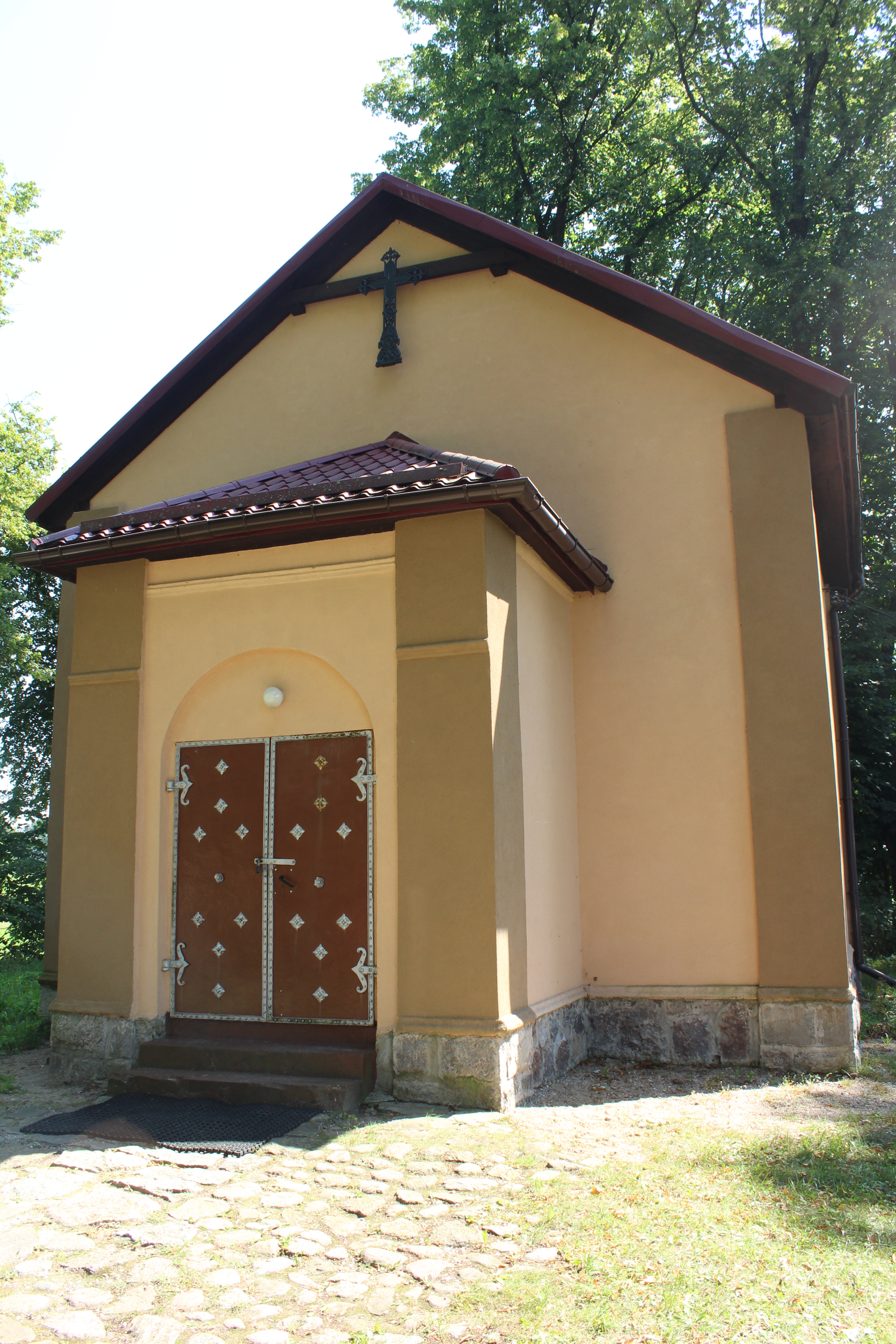
- Chapel of Good Shepherd

- Location within Poland
- Coordinates: 54°5′N 22°3′E
- Country: Poland
- Voivodeship: Warmian-Masurian
- County: Giżycko
- Gmina: Kruklanki
- Founded: 1617

Population (approx.)
  - Total: 202
- Time zone: UTC+1 (CET)
  - Summer (DST): UTC+2 (CEST)
- Vehicle registration: NGI

Możdżany [mɔʐˈd͡ʐanɨ] is a village in the administrative district of Gmina Kruklanki, within Giżycko County, Warmian-Masurian Voivodeship, in north-eastern Poland.

== History ==
The village was founded in 1617.

From the 18th century, it was part of the Kingdom of Prussia, and from 1871 to 1945 also of Germany, within which it was administratively located in the province of East Prussia. As of 1860, it had a population of 119. In 1930, it was renamed to Borkenwalde to erase traces of Polish origin. After World War II, the village became again part of Poland and its historic Polish name was restored.

== Notable residents ==
- Dieter Wisliceny (1911–1948), German Nazi SS officer and perpetrator of the Holocaust executed for war crimes
- Günther-Eberhardt Wisliceny (1912-1985), SS officer and recipient of the Knight's Cross of the Iron Cross with Oak Leaves and Swords
