= Kamienna Struga =

- Settlement
- Location within Poland
- Coordinates: 54°3′46″N 22°3′41″E
- Country: Poland
- Voivodeship: Warmian-Masurian
- County: Giżycko
- Gmina: Kruklanki

Kamienna Struga [kaˈmjɛnna ˈstruɡa] is a settlement in the administrative district of Gmina Kruklanki, within Giżycko County, Warmian-Masurian Voivodeship, in northern Poland.
