= Wolisko, Giżycko County =

Wolisko
- Village
- Location within Poland
- Coordinates: 54°6′1″N 22°5′37″E
- Country: Poland
- Voivodeship: Warmian-Masurian
- County: Giżycko
- Gmina: Kruklanki
- Population: 20

Wolisko [vɔˈliskɔ] is a village in the administrative district of Gmina Kruklanki, within Giżycko County, Warmian-Masurian Voivodeship, in northern Poland.
