= Krzna =

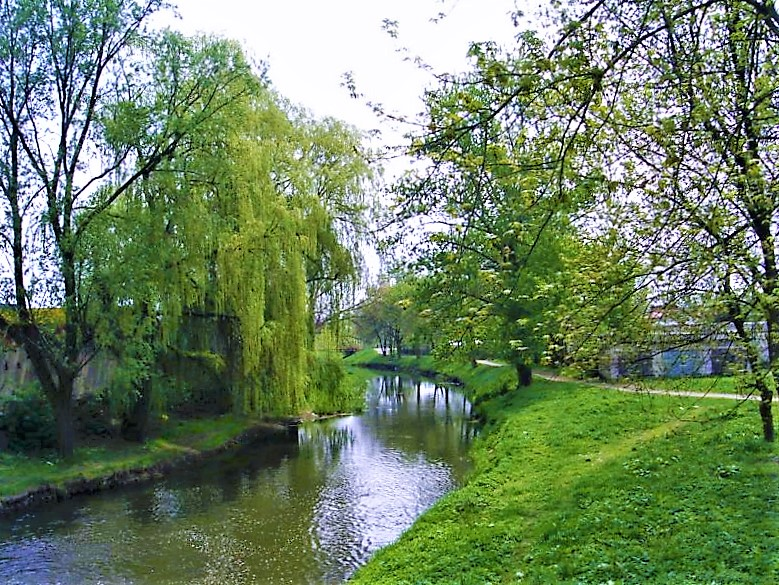
- Krzna in Międzyrzec Podlaski

Location
- Country: Poland

Physical characteristics
- Mouth
  - location: Bug
  - coordinates: 52.1328°N 23.5219°E
- Length: 107 km (66 mi)
- Basin size: 3,273 km^{2} (1,264 sq mi)
- Discharge
  - average: 11.4 m^{3}/s (400 cu ft/s)

Basin features
- Progression: Bug→ Narew→ Vistula→ Baltic Sea

The Krzna pronounced [ˈkʂna] is a river in eastern Poland, and a left tributary of the Bug. The river is 107 kilometres (66 mi) long and its watershed area is 3,273 square kilometres (1,263.7 sq mi). The Krzna flows through Poland's Lublin Voivodeship. It arises from the connection of two water jets flowing in the Łuków Forest: Northern Krzna and Southern Krzna which is considered to be the beginning of the Krzna. The river empties into the Bug near the town of Terespol and the village of Neple, close to the Belarus border near, the city of Brest. A canal connects it to the Wieprz.

== The Northern Krzna ==
The Northern Krzna is a short river which connects with the Southern Krzna in the town of Międzyrzec Podlaski. Similarly to the Southern Krzna, the river flows from Łuków Forests, center of which was formerly inaccessible Jata marsh and nowadays it is a wildlife reserve of the same name. The Northern Krzna is shorter than the Southern Krzna. However, its watershed area is bigger. During the Pleistocene epoch, the valley of the Northern Krzna was one of the routes of draining meltwater to the East. Nowadays, it drains the northern area of Łuków Plain, particularly the remainings of a sandur. From the Jata reserve to the village of Gołaszyn, the Northern Krzna is on the terrain of Łuków Park of Protected Landscape.

== Features of the Krzna ==
The Krzna is a naturally meandering river, partially unbended by hydrological processes which constantly change her original character. In the lower current, the water levels of the Krzna are strictly dependent on the Bug River. A characteristic feature of the Krzna are numerous oxbow lakes.

The average flow of the Krzna close to its estuary is 10.5 cubic metres per second (370.8 cu ft/s). The maximum range of water levels in the lower course is 3.3 metres (11 ft).

Some sections of the Krzna valley are taken into protection, e.g. in the Bug River Gorge Landscape Park of Podlachia, ornithological reserve Czapli Stóg and Kania Nature Reserve (in the Southern Krzna valley).

== Tributaries ==
The most important tributaries of the Krzna are:

- right tributaries: Dziegciarka, Rudka, Zielawa, Czapelka
- left tributaries: Krzymosza, Piszczanka, Złota Krzywula, Klukówka

== The most important towns located by the Krzna ==
Łuków (Southern Krzna), Międzyrzec Podlaski, Biała Podlaska
