= Sołtmany (meteorite) =

2011 meteorite found in Poland

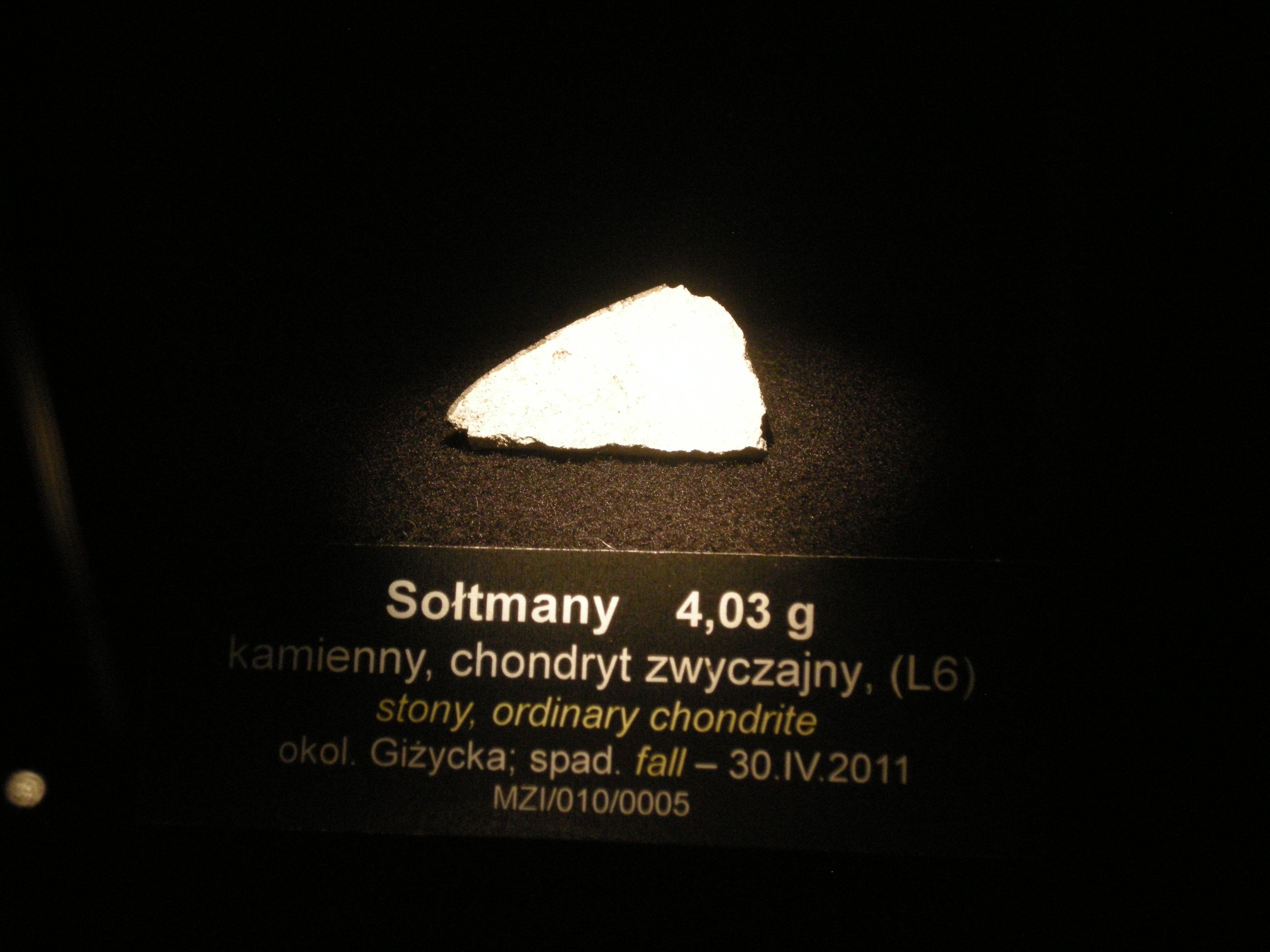
- Type: Chondrite
- Class: Ordinary chondrite
- Group: L6
- Country: Poland
- Region: Warmińsko - Mazurskie
- Coordinates: 54°00′N 22°00′E
- Observed fall: Yes
- Fall date: April 30, 2011
- TKW: 1066 g

Sołtmany is an L6 ordinary chondrite meteorite which fell on 30 April 2011 in Sołtmany village, Poland. The fall occurred at around 6:00 am. A single meteorite penetrated the edge of a roof and shattered on concrete floor into several pieces. It was immediately found by the owners of the farm, alarmed by the loud noise.

== See also ==
- Glossary of meteoritics
- Meteorite fall
