= Puszcza Biała =

Forest in Poland

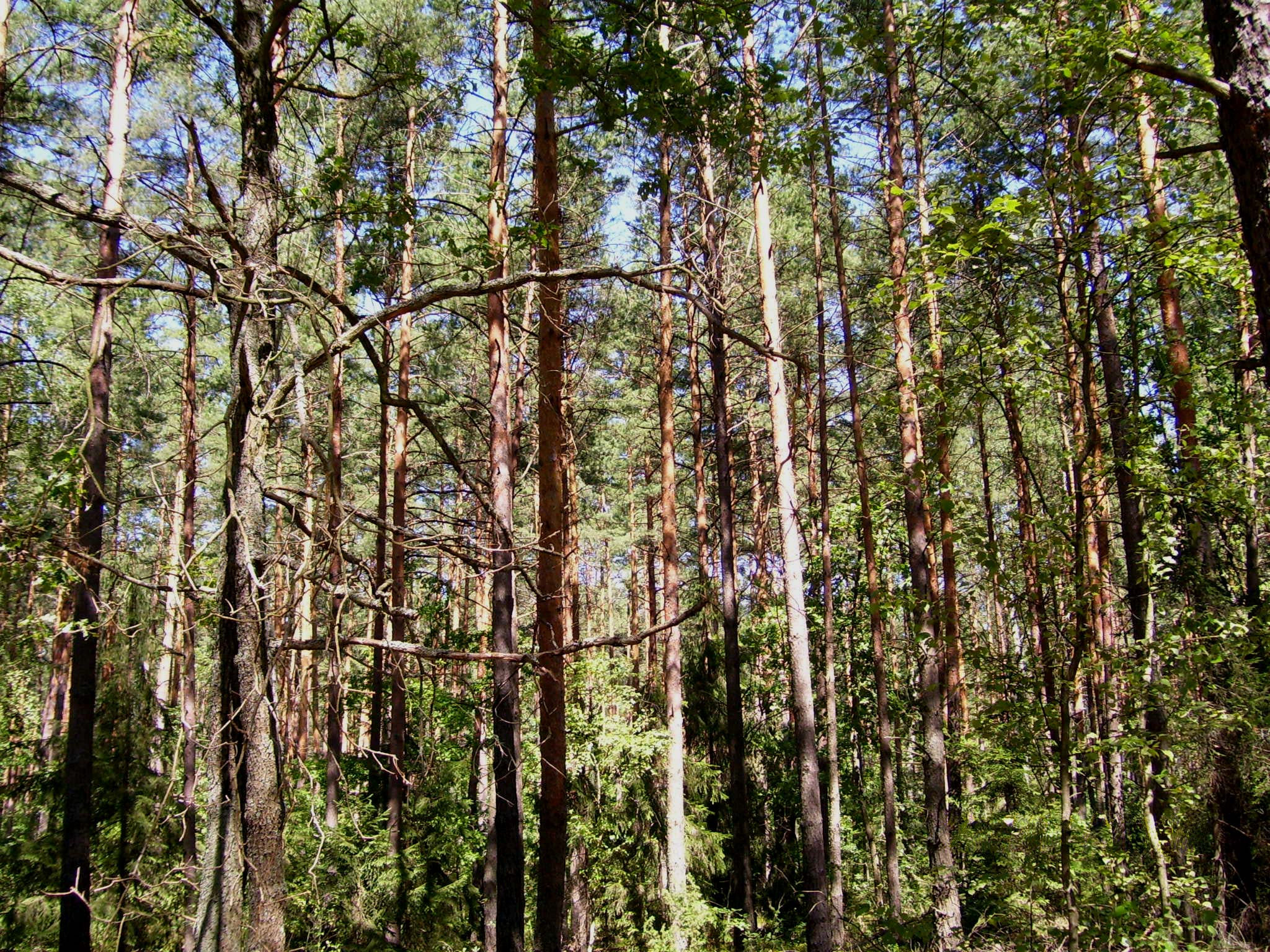

- Location within Poland
- Interactive map of Puszcza Biała

Geography
- Location: Masovian Voivodeship, Poland
- Coordinates: 52°42′54″N 21°47′24″E

Ecology
- Dominant tree species: pine

Puszcza Biała (Polish pronunciation: [ˈpuʂt͡ʂa ˈbjawa], White Wilderness) is the name given to the forest that extends in Poland from Pułtusk to Ostrów Mazowiecka. It is part of the Mazovian lowlands and consists of small trees, mostly pine.

The White Wilderness (Puszcza Biała) is usually associated with the Green Wilderness (Puszcza Zielona), and together the two forests are often referred to as the Kurpie Forest (Puszcza Kurpiowska) because the two forests were populated by inhabitants who, over the centuries of isolation, developed a unique culture of their own, called Kurpie.

== Settlements in the Puszcza Biała ==
- Pułtusk
- Pniewo
- Tocznabiel
- Ostrów Mazowiecka
- Wyszków
- Brok
- Długosiodło
- Brańszczyk
- Obryte
- Rząśnik
- Nowy Lubiel
- Popowo-Letnisko

== Rivers running through the Puszcza Biała ==
- Bug
- Narew
- Brok
- Zgorza Struga

== Nature preserves within the Puszcza Biała ==
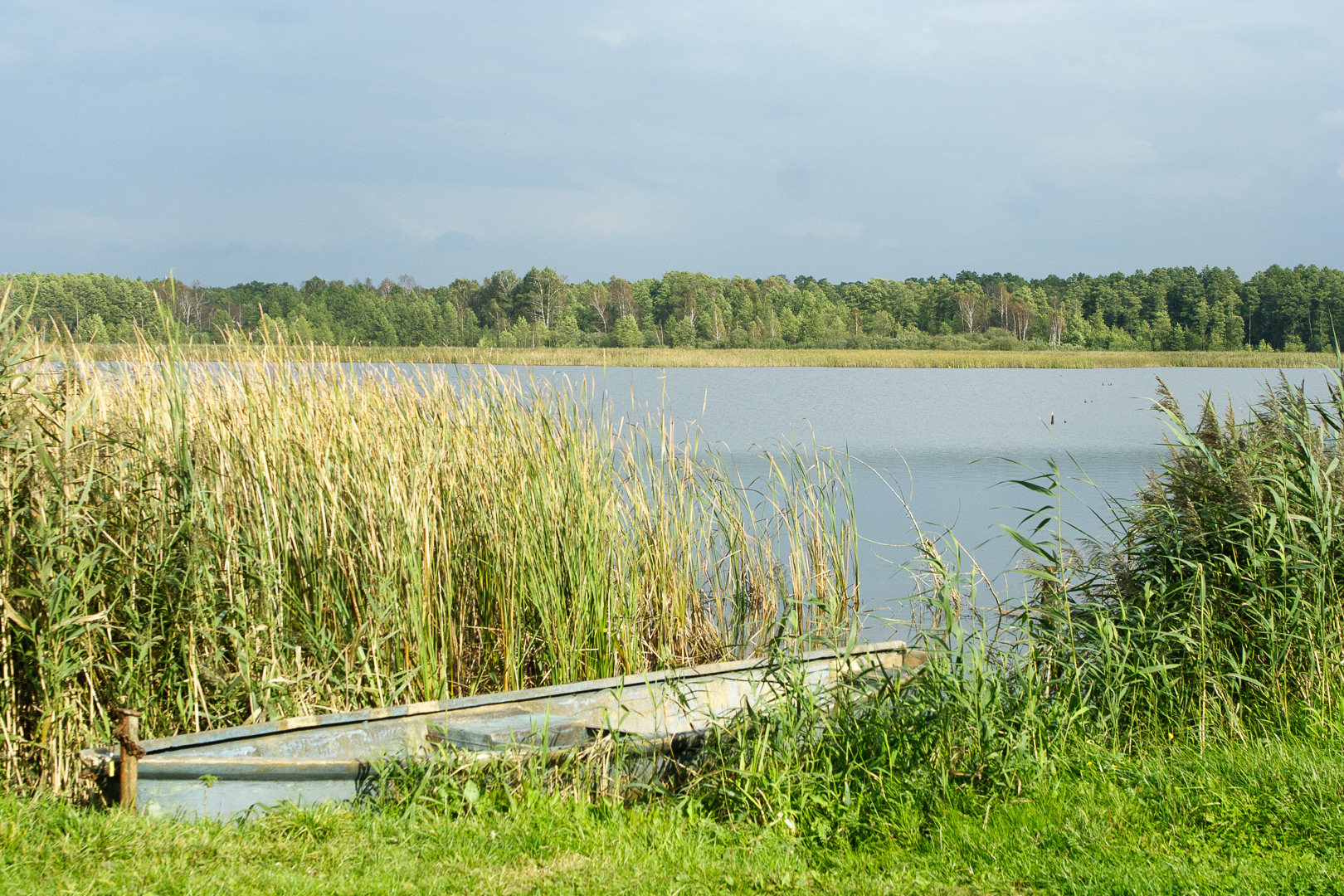
Nature reserve Stawinoga

- Rezerwat przyrody Stawinoga
- Rezerwat przyrody Popławy
- Rezerwat przyrody Bartnia
- Rezerwat przyrody Wielgolas

== See also ==
- Polish forests
- Puszcza Kurpiowska
- Puszcza Zielona
- Kurpie
- Kurpie Białe
