= Jeziorowskie, Giżycko County =

Jeziorowskie
- Village
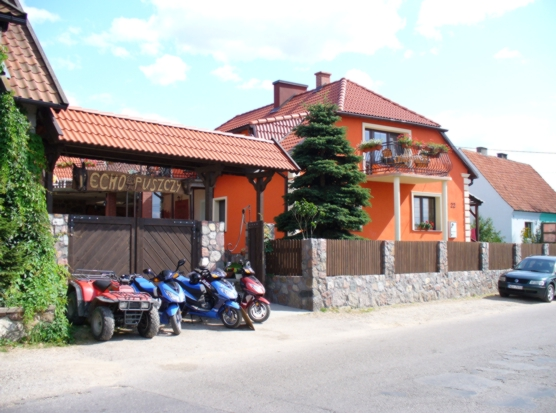
- Houses in Jeziorowskie

- Location within Poland
- Coordinates: 54°6′41″N 21°58′15″E
- Country: Poland
- Voivodeship: Warmian-Masurian
- County: Giżycko
- Gmina: Kruklanki
- Population: 190

Jeziorowskie [jɛʑɔˈrɔfskʲɛ] is a village in the administrative district of Gmina Kruklanki, within Giżycko County, Warmian-Masurian Voivodeship, in northern Poland.
