= Neple =

- Village
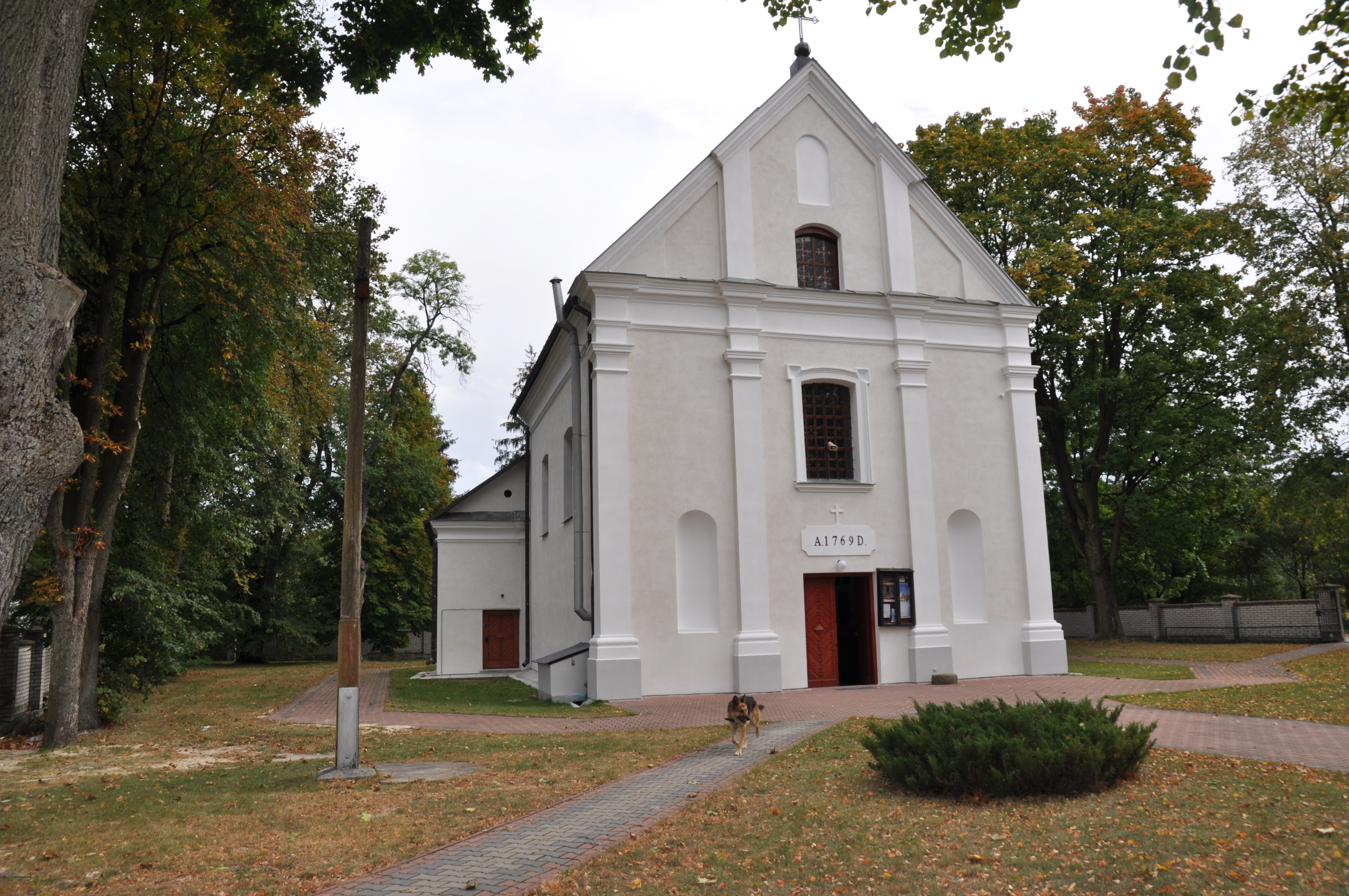
- The Parish church of the Exaltation of the Cross, Neple

- Location within Poland
- Coordinates: 52°7′N 23°32′E
- Country: Poland
- Voivodeship: Lublin
- County: Biała
- Gmina: Terespol

Neple [ˈnɛplɛ] is a village in the administrative district of Gmina Terespol, within Biała County, Lublin Voivodeship, in eastern Poland, close to the border with Belarus. The village lays in the vicinity of Krzna river and Bug river. The village has a large number of historic monuments and architecture. Caritas relief has operated a holiday resort in Neple.
