= Grądy Kruklaneckie =

- Settlement
- Location within Poland
- Coordinates: 54°04′56″N 21°56′28″E
- Country: Poland
- Voivodeship: Warmian-Masurian
- County: Giżycko
- Gmina: Kruklanki

Grądy Kruklaneckie [ˈɡrɔndɨ kruklaˈnɛt͡skʲɛ] is a settlement in the administrative district of Gmina Kruklanki, within Giżycko County, Warmian-Masurian Voivodeship, in northern Poland.
