= Lipowo, Giżycko County =

Lipowo
- Village
- Location within Poland
- Coordinates: 54°5′N 22°7′E
- Country: Poland
- Voivodeship: Warmian-Masurian
- County: Giżycko
- Gmina: Kruklanki

Lipowo ([liˈpɔvɔ]; German: Lindenheim) is a village in the administrative district of Gmina Kruklanki, within Giżycko County, Warmian-Masurian Voivodeship, in northern Poland.
