= Budziska Leśne =

- Settlement
- Location within Poland
- Coordinates: 54°10′15″N 22°5′26″E
- Country: Poland
- Voivodeship: Warmian-Masurian
- County: Giżycko
- Gmina: Kruklanki

Budziska Leśne [buˈd͡ʑiska ˈlɛɕnɛ] is a settlement in the administrative district of Gmina Kruklanki, within Giżycko County, Warmian-Masurian Voivodeship, in northern Poland.
