= Podleśne, Giżycko County =

Podleśne
- Village
- Location within Poland
- Coordinates: 54°6′50″N 22°1′16″E
- Country: Poland
- Voivodeship: Warmian-Masurian
- County: Giżycko
- Gmina: Kruklanki
- Population: 10

Podleśne [pɔdˈlɛɕnɛ] is a village in the administrative district of Gmina Kruklanki, within Giżycko County, Warmian-Masurian Voivodeship, in northern Poland.
