= Brożówka =

- Village
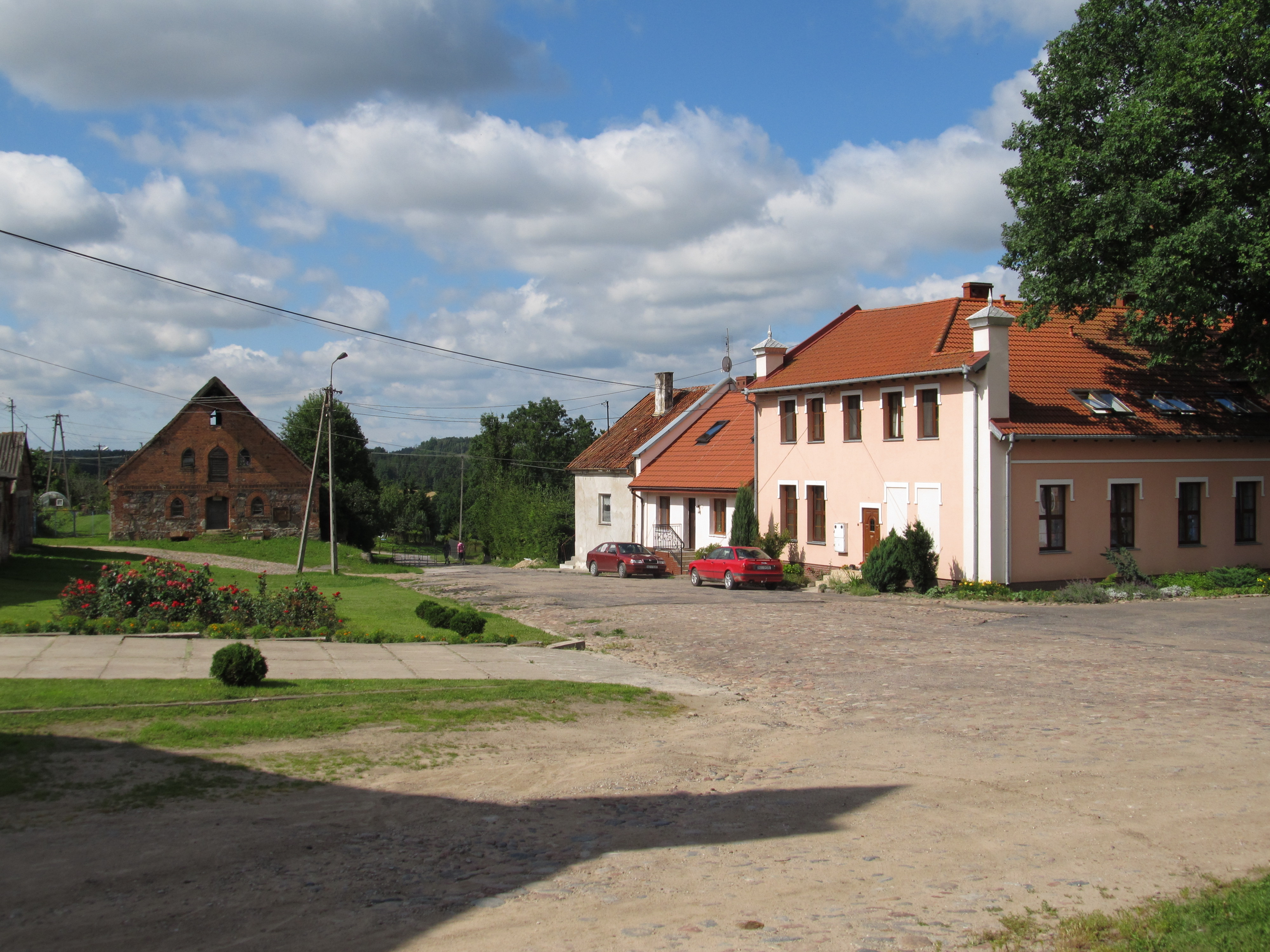
- Houses in Brożówka

- Location within Poland
- Coordinates: 54°6′N 21°58′E
- Country: Poland
- Voivodeship: Warmian-Masurian
- County: Giżycko
- Gmina: Kruklanki

Brożówka [brɔˈʐufka] is a village in the administrative district of Gmina Kruklanki, within Giżycko County, Warmian-Masurian Voivodeship, in northern Poland.
