= Żabinka, Warmian-Masurian Voivodeship =

Żabinka
- Village
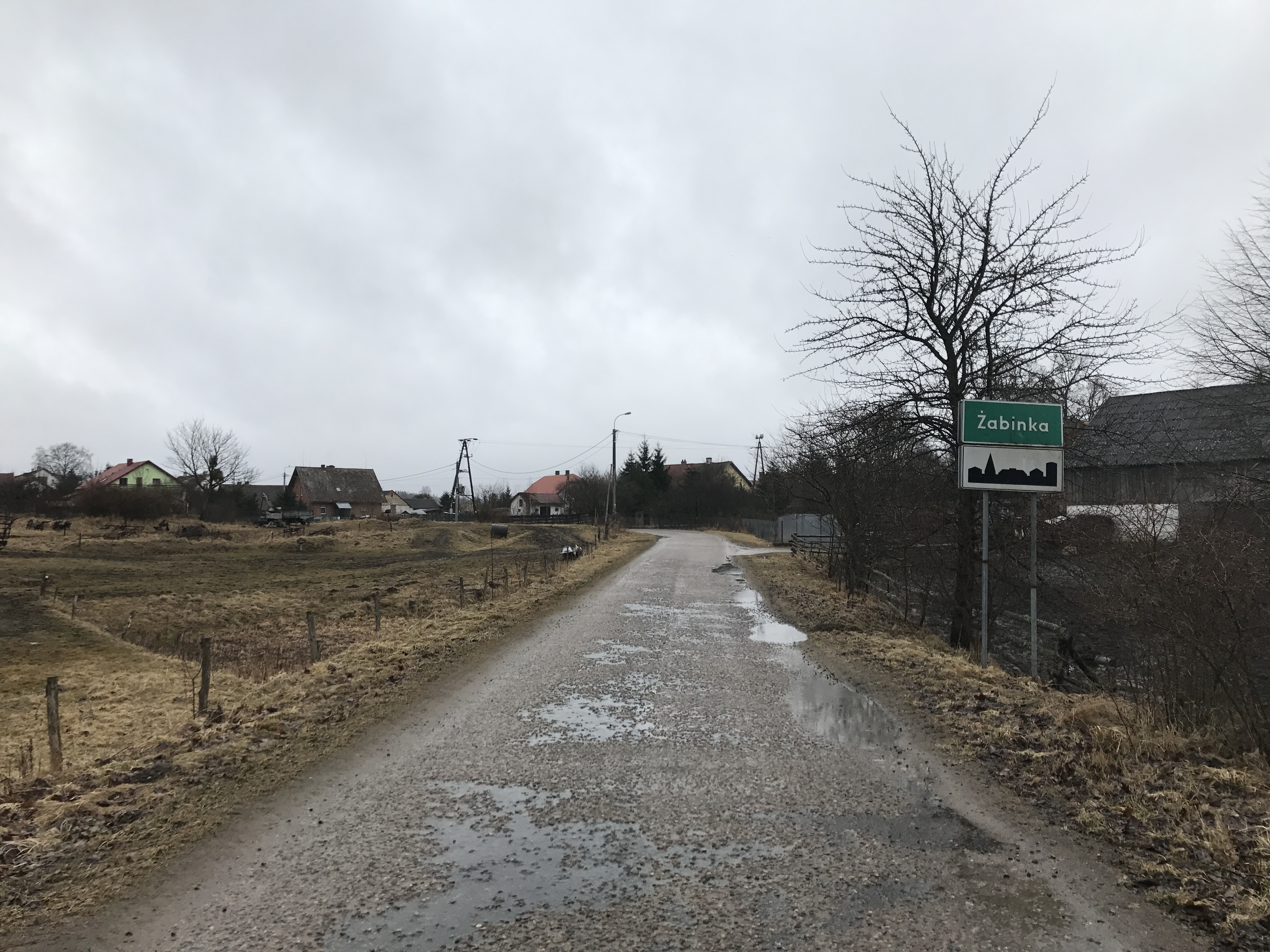
- Entering Żabinka

- Location within Poland
- Coordinates: 54°7′40″N 21°59′31″E
- Country: Poland
- Voivodeship: Warmian-Masurian
- County: Giżycko
- Gmina: Kruklanki
- Population: 100

Żabinka [ʐaˈbinka] is a village in the administrative district of Gmina Kruklanki, within Giżycko County, Warmian-Masurian Voivodeship, in northern Poland.
