= Kruklanki =

- Village
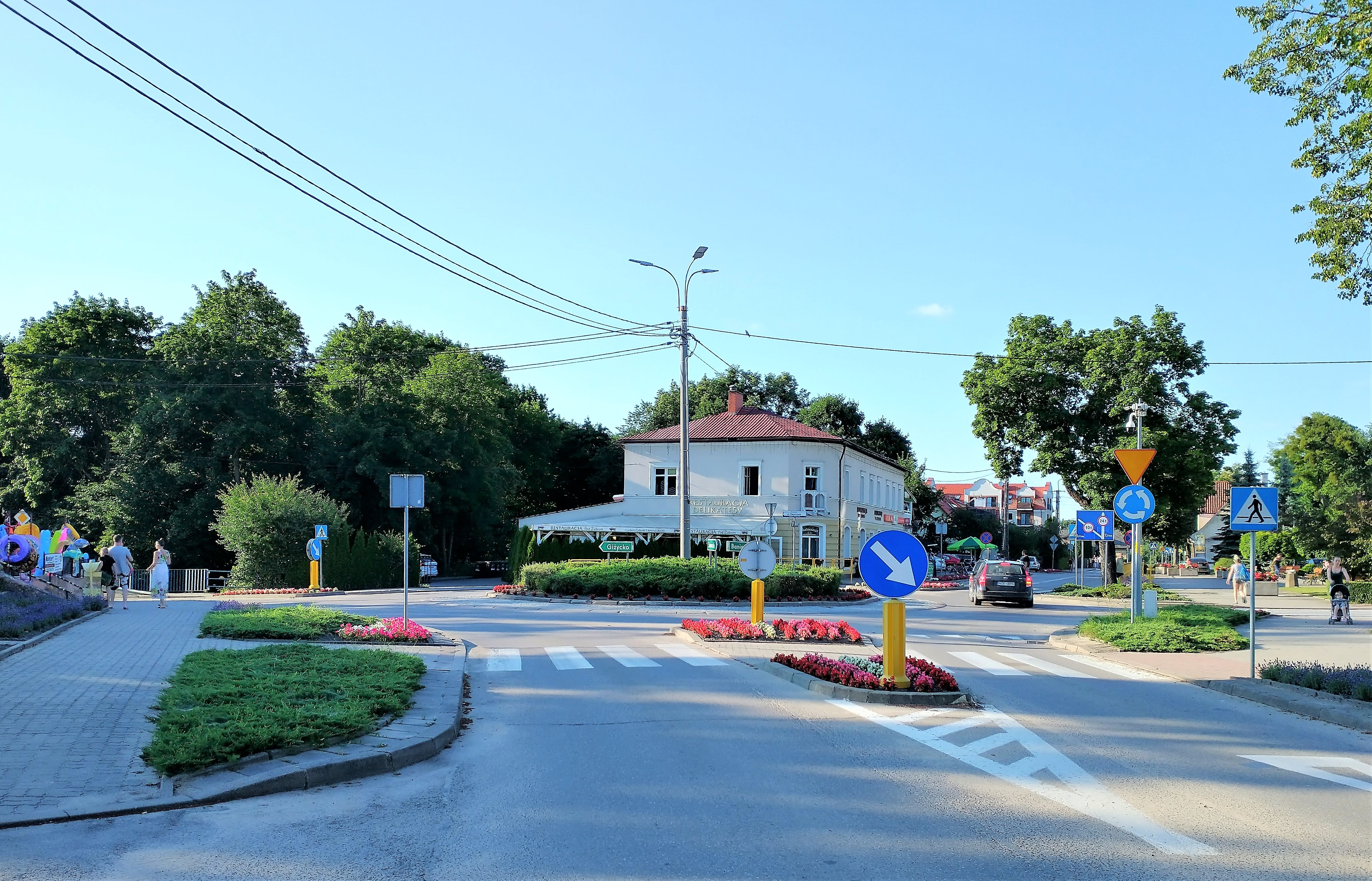
- Center of Kruklanki

- Location within Poland
- Coordinates: 54°5′18″N 21°55′21″E
- Country: Poland
- Voivodeship: Warmian-Masurian
- County: Giżycko
- Gmina: Kruklanki
- Founded: 1545
- Founder: Jan Bębelnik

Population
  - Total: 1,100
- Time zone: UTC+1 (CET)
  - Summer (DST): UTC+2 (CEST)
- Vehicle registration: NGI
- Website: http://www.kruklanki.pl

Kruklanki [kruˈklanki] is a village in Giżycko County, Warmian-Masurian Voivodeship, in northern Poland. It is the seat of the gmina (administrative district) called Gmina Kruklanki.

It is located in Masuria.

== History ==
Kruklanki was established in 1545 by Jan Bębelnik, who bought land to establish the village. It was first settled and then predominantly inhabited for centuries by Polish people. A new church was built in c. 1574.

During World War II, six Polish generals, including Tadeusz Bór-Komorowski, and around 20 aides-de-camp and orderlies were initially held as prisoners of war by the Germans in the village after the suppression of the Warsaw Uprising in 1944. The Germans offered the Polish generals to collaborate, but the Poles declined.
