= Knieja Łuczańska =

- Settlement
- Location within Poland
- Coordinates: 54°6′6″N 22°0′57″E
- Country: Poland
- Voivodeship: Warmian-Masurian
- County: Giżycko
- Gmina: Kruklanki

Knieja Łuczańska [ˈkɲɛja wuˈt͡ʂaɲska] is a settlement in the administrative district of Gmina Kruklanki, within Giżycko County, Warmian-Masurian Voivodeship, in northern Poland.
