= Żywki =

- Village
- Location within Poland
- Coordinates: 54°4′N 22°3′E
- Country: Poland
- Voivodeship: Warmian-Masurian
- County: Giżycko
- Gmina: Kruklanki

Żywki [ˈʐɨfki] is a village in the administrative district of Gmina Kruklanki, within Giżycko County, Warmian-Masurian Voivodeship, in northern Poland.
