= Jurkowo, Giżycko County =

Jurkowo
- Village
- Location within Poland
- Coordinates: 54°4′23″N 22°3′26″E
- Country: Poland
- Voivodeship: Warmian-Masurian
- County: Giżycko
- Gmina: Kruklanki
- Population: 170

Jurkowo [jurˈkɔvɔ vɛnɡɔˈʐɛfskʲɛ] (formerly Jurkowo Węgorzewskie) is a village in the administrative district of Gmina Kruklanki, within Giżycko County, Warmian-Masurian Voivodeship, in northern Poland.
