= Orzyc (river) =

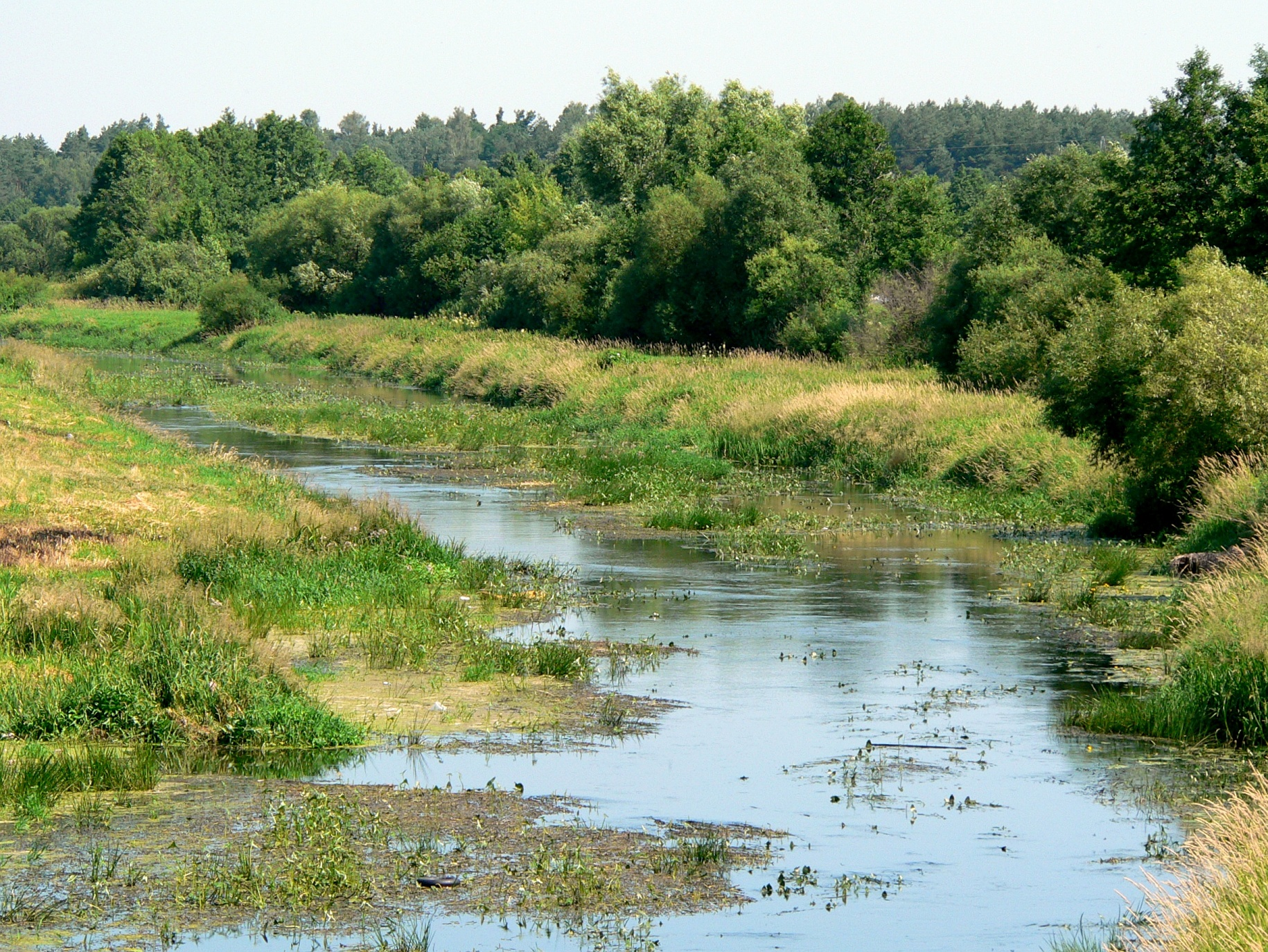

Location
- Country: Poland

Physical characteristics
- Mouth
  - location: Narew
  - coordinates: 52.7678°N 21.2282°E
- Length: 146 km (91 mi)

Basin features
- Progression: Narew→ Vistula→ Baltic Sea

Orzyc (also Orzycz or Orzyca) is a river in east-central Poland, a right tributary of the Narew, with a length of 146 kilometers. It forms the western border of the Puszcza Kurpiowska, and flows into the Narew at Kalinowo.

Its own tributaries include the Grabowski Rów, Baranowska Struga, Tamka, Bobrynka, Ulatówka, Bramura, and Węgierka.
