= Dieter Wisliceny =

German Nazi officer and war criminal (1911–1948)

- Born: Dietrich Wisliceny; 13 January 1911; Estate Regulowken near Mosdzehnen, Kreis Angerburg, Kingdom of Prussia
- Died: 4 May 1948 (aged 37); Bratislava, Czechoslovakia
- Status: Executed by hanging
- Conviction: Crimes against humanity
- Penalty: Death
- Military career
- Relatives: Günther-Eberhardt Wisliceny (brother)
- Allegiance: Nazi Germany
- Branch: Sturmabteilung; Schutzstaffel
- Service years: 1931–1945
- Rank: SS-Hauptsturmführer
- Units: SS-Totenkopfverbände

Dietrich "Dieter" Wisliceny (13 January 1911 – 4 May 1948) was a member of the Schutzstaffel (SS) and one of the deputies of Adolf Eichmann, helping to organise and coordinate the large-scale deportations of the Jews across Europe during the Holocaust. At the Nuremberg trials, he testified about the Nazi deportation and murder of European Jews.

== Life ==
Dieter was born in 1911 as the son of the lord of the manor (Rittergut Regulowken) Erich Wisliceny (d. 1928) and his wife Wally, née Paul, in East Prussia. In 1919, after losing the estate, the family moved to Silesia.

After graduating from Gymnasium in Breslau, Wisliceny began studying theology in 1930 at the University of Breslau, but dropped out after one semester.

On 1 October 1931, Wisliceny became a member of the Nazi Party and of a formation of the Sturmabteilung (SA). In 1934, he switched from the SA to the SS and became a member of the SD. Wisliceny eventually rose to the rank of SS-Hauptsturmführer (captain) in 1940; he worked in the Reich Security Main Office Referat IV B4 under Adolf Eichmann.

During implementation of the Final Solution, his task was the ghettoization and liquidation of several important Jewish communities in Nazi-occupied Europe, including those of Greece, Hungary and Slovakia. Wisliceny also re-introduced the yellow star in occupied countries; the yellow star being used to distinguish Jews from non-Jews.

Wisliceny was an important witness at the Nuremberg trials. His testimony would later prove important in the successful prosecution of Eichmann for his complicity in the Holocaust in Israel in 1961.

During the trial on 3 January 1946, Wisliceny was asked what happened to approximately 450,000 Hungarian Jews who had been deported. He answered: "They were, without exception, taken to Auschwitz and brought to the final solution." When the prosecutor asked, "Do you mean they were killed?", Wisliceny replied: "Yes, with the exception of perhaps 25 to 30 percent who were used for labor purposes". He added that his estimate came from a conversation involving Rudolf Höss and Eichmann in Budapest.

== Death ==
Wisliceny was extradited to Czechoslovakia, where he was tried and hanged for war crimes in 1948.

== Awards and decorations (excerpt) ==
- Honour Chevron for the Old Guard
- Honour Sword of the Reichsführers-SS
- Danzig Cross, 2nd Class
- Nazi Party Long Service Award in Bronze (10 years)
- SS Long Service Award, 3rd Grade (8 years) in 1942
- War Merit Cross (1939), 2nd Class with Swords
