= Łuków Forest =

Forest in Poland

Łuków Forest Polish: Lasy Łukowskie
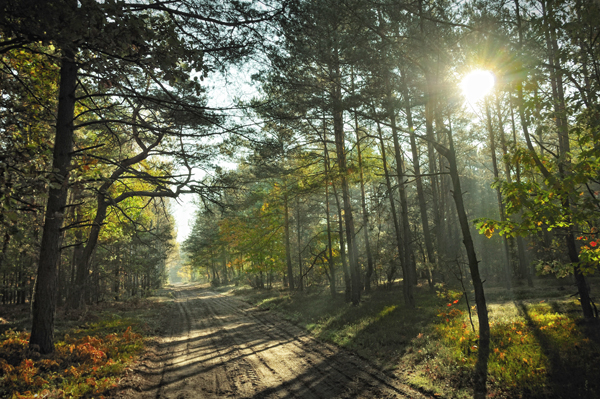
- A road in nature reserve Jata

- Location within Poland
- Interactive map of Łuków Forest

Geography
- Location: Łuków County, Siedlce County, Lublin Voivodeship, Masovian Voivodeship, Poland
- Coordinates: 51.98°N 22.21°E

Ecology
- Dominant tree species: pine

Łuków Forest (Polish: Lasy Łukowskie) is the largest forest complex in South Podlachia Plain near Łuków in eastern Poland. Krzna river flows out of the forest. The complex has an area of 105 square kilometres (41 sq mi)

== History ==
Before the Partitions of Poland the forests were the royal wilderness. During the January Uprising the area were used to be a base and shelter of Polish insurgents led by priest Stanisław Brzóska. During the Second World War, partisans of the Polish resistance movement also operated in the area.

Memorials in the Łuków Forest

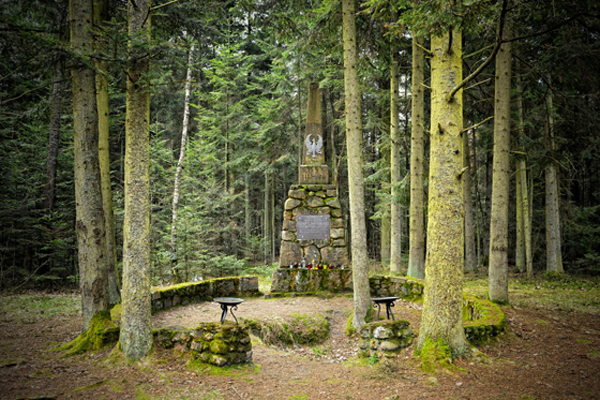
Memorial to Stanisław Brzóska

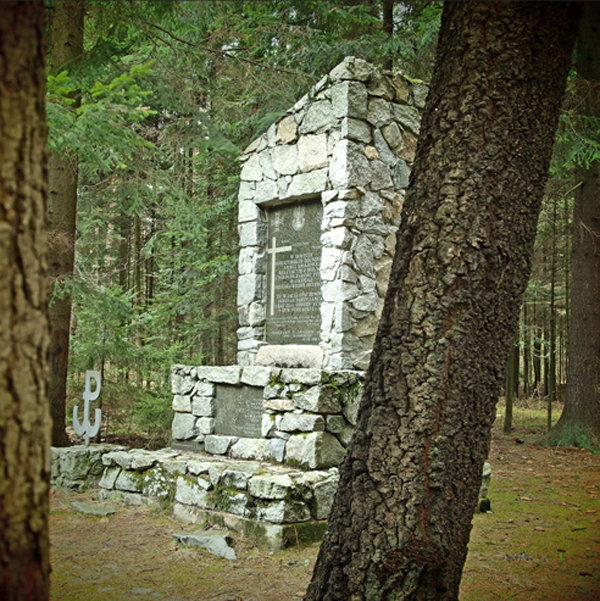
Memorial to the Home Army

== Flora ==
Nature of the Łuków Forest

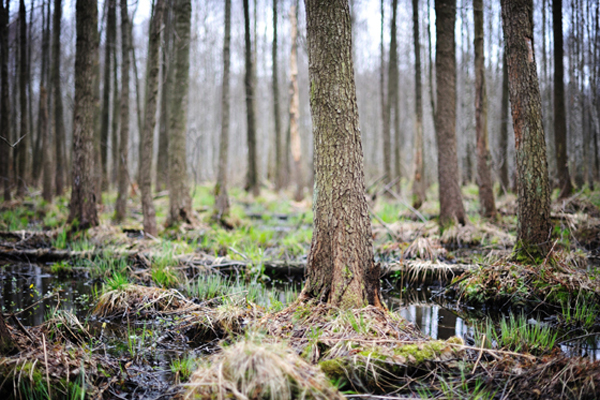
Swamp in nature reserve Jata

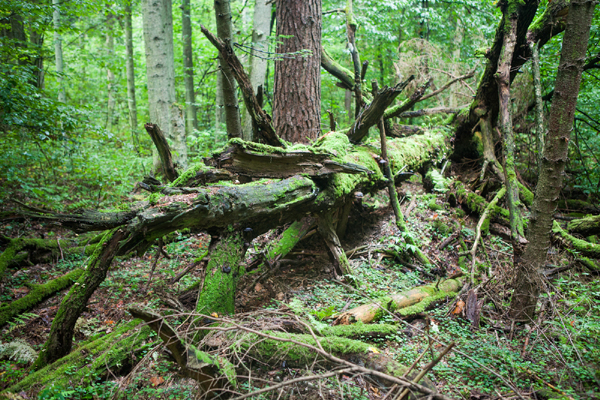
Fragment of strict nature reserve Jata

Species of trees in the forest:

Nr	Species of tree	Percent
1.	Pine	83.28
2.	Oak	5.12
3.	Alder	5.05
4.	Birch	4.34
5.	Fir	0.83
6.	Spruce	0.74
7.	Larch	0.21
8.	Ash	0.12
9.	Aspen	0.07
10.	Douglas	0.04

== Nature conservation ==
In Łuków Forest occur two nature reserves: Jata and Topór.

Object of the protection are fir forests growing out of range occurring the species.

== Bibliography ==
- Chudek, Mariusz (2004). Powiat Łukowski [Łuków County] (in Polish and English). Toruńskie Wydawnictwo Promocyjne ″Kopernik 2000″. ISBN 83-88755-20-X.
- Superintendency Łuków
