= State Forests (Poland) =

Government agency of Poland

- Lasy Państwowe; Państwowe Gospodarstwo Leśne Lasy Państwowe
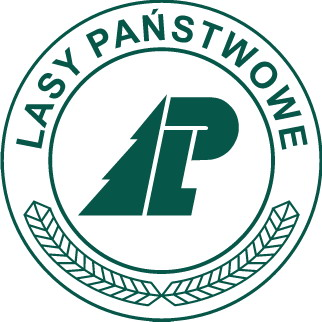

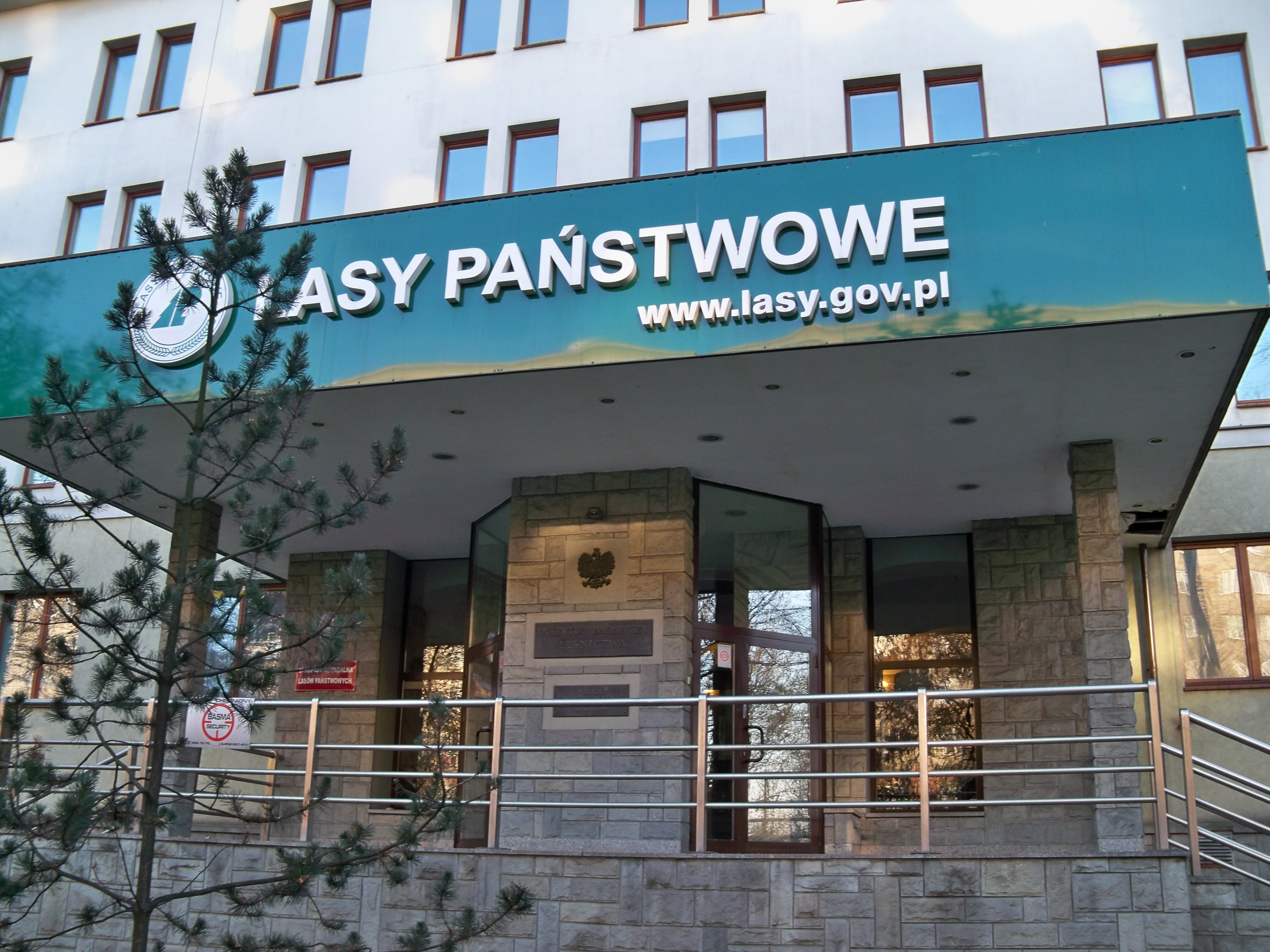
- General Directorate of State Forest

Agency overview
- Formed: 1924; 102 years ago
- Jurisdiction: Poland
- Headquarters: Warsaw
- Parent agency: Treasury of Poland
- Website: http://www.lasy.gov.pl/

State Forests (Polish: Lasy Państwowe, full name: Państwowe Gospodarstwo Leśne Lasy Państwowe, literally National Forest Holding "State Forests", but usually referred to as State Forests National Forest Holding)^{[a]} is a Polish governmental organization that manages state-owned Polish forests on behalf of the Polish State Treasury. The organization does not have a legal personality and is required to be financially self-sufficient.

The Act on Forests of 28 September 1991, with amendments, makes the State Forests responsible for "forest management to ensure general protection of forests, sustainable maintenance, continuity and sustainable use of all forest functions and increase of forest resources".

It was founded in 1924 and oversees about 7.5 million hectares (an area that constitutes about 25% of Poland's territory) of forested terrain. The territory managed by the State Forests covers about 77.8% of Polish forests.^{[b]} Notably, State Forests do not manage Poland's National Parks^{[c]}. They are, however, involved in managing of forests in Landscape Parks (which cover about 8% of Poland's territory).

As of 2008, the fixed assets owned by State Forests were worth PLN 3,659.3 million.

In 2013, State Forests received the prestigious Sultan Qaboos Prize for Environmental Preservation, for outstanding contributions in the management and preservation of the environment (see and ).

== Managed forests ==
As of 31 December 2008, State Forests managed 7,595,372 hectares. These were classified as:

- forests, total 7,264,353 ha, including: afforested land 6,972,731 ha, non-afforested land 91,714 ha
- farmland 153,261 ha
- wasteland 102,742 ha
- waters 9,392 ha
- trees and shrubs outside forest 13,118 ha

Over 70% of trees administered by State Forests are pine and larch. The average age of the trees is around 60 years.

== Organization ==
State Forests is headed by the Director General. The General Directorate supervises 17 Regional Directorates, which in turn are divided into 431 Forest Districts. There are also 22 organisational units (departments), seven organisational units – departments with national authority, nine Forest Protection Teams and eleven Inspection Regions.

Since 7 February 2012, the Director General is Adam Wasiak.

The 17 Regional Directorates of State Forests are:

- Białystok
- Gdańsk
- Katowice
- Kraków
- Krosno
- Lublin
- Łódź
- Olsztyn
- Piła
- Poznań
- Radom
- Szczecin
- Szczecinek
- Toruń
- Warsaw
- Wrocław
- Zielona Góra

In 2008, State Forests employed 26,054 people.

== Notes ==
a The Act on Forests of September 28, 1991, translated, states that "Forests constituting Treasury property are under the administration and management of the Lasy Państwowe (State Forests) National Forest Holding, hereinafter referred to as “the State Forests”". Organization's own website uses the term "State Forests National Forest Holding" without parenthesis or quotation marks.

b As of 2012, Poland had 9,100,000 hectares of forests, representing about 29,2% of country's total territory. Its overall percentage is still increasing. Forests of Poland is managed by the national program of reforestation (KPZL), aiming at an increase of forest-cover to 33% in 2050.

c National Parks constitute 2% of Polish forests, and cover about 0,6% of Poland's territory.

== See also ==
- Forests of Poland
- National Parks of Poland
- List of Landscape Parks of Poland
- Nature reserves in Poland
- ordynacja
