= Boćwinka, Giżycko County =

Boćwinka
- Village
- Location within Poland
- Coordinates: 54°4′N 21°59′E
- Country: Poland
- Voivodeship: Warmian-Masurian
- County: Giżycko
- Gmina: Kruklanki
- Founded: 1554
- Founder: Łukasz Lipiński
- Time zone: UTC+1 (CET)
  - Summer (DST): UTC+2 (CEST)
- Vehicle registration: NOE

Boćwinka [bɔt͡ɕˈfinka] is a village in the administrative district of Gmina Kruklanki, within Giżycko County, Warmian-Masurian Voivodeship, in north-eastern Poland. It is located in the region of Masuria.

== History ==
The origins of the village date back to 1554, when Łukasz Lipiński bought land to establish a village. In 1860, the village had a population of 354.
