= Borki, Gmina Kruklanki =

Borki
- Village
- Location within Poland
- Coordinates: 54°04′14″N 22°02′09″E
- Country: Poland
- Voivodeship: Warmian-Masurian
- County: Giżycko
- Gmina: Kruklanki

Borki [ˈbɔrki] is a village in the administrative district of Gmina Kruklanki, within Giżycko County, Warmian-Masurian Voivodeship, in northern Poland.
