= Sergiusz Toll =

Late entomologist

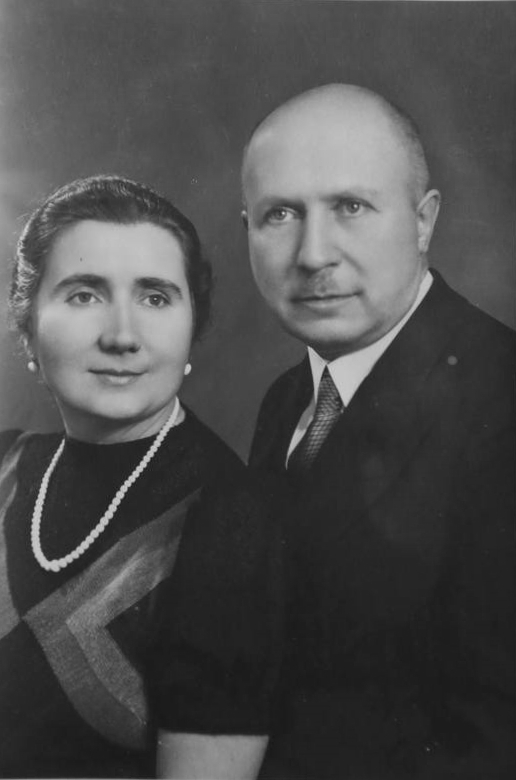
Józefina and Sergiusz Toll

Sergiusz Graf von Toll (22 November 1893 – 19 December 1961) was a Polish entomologist who specialised in microlepidoptera and particularly Coleophoridae. He was a member of the Polish Academy of Sciences.

== Education ==
Toll was born on 22 November 1893 in Warsaw, the son of Alexander Toll and his wife Adelaide (or Anna). He had four elder brothers and sisters. He came from a noble family; his great-grandfather, General Karol Toll, was made a count by Nicholas I of Russia and the family owned Uniejów Castle at Łódź Voivodeship in central Poland. He received his schooling in Warsaw and went to the University of Warsaw where he studied law. During World War I, the university was evacuated to Rostov-on-Don in Russia, and while there, he added biology to the subjects he was studying. In 1918, he was awarded his PhD in law. He had already developed his interest in butterflies and moths and while in Russia he studied the lepidoptera of the Rostov region.

== Career ==
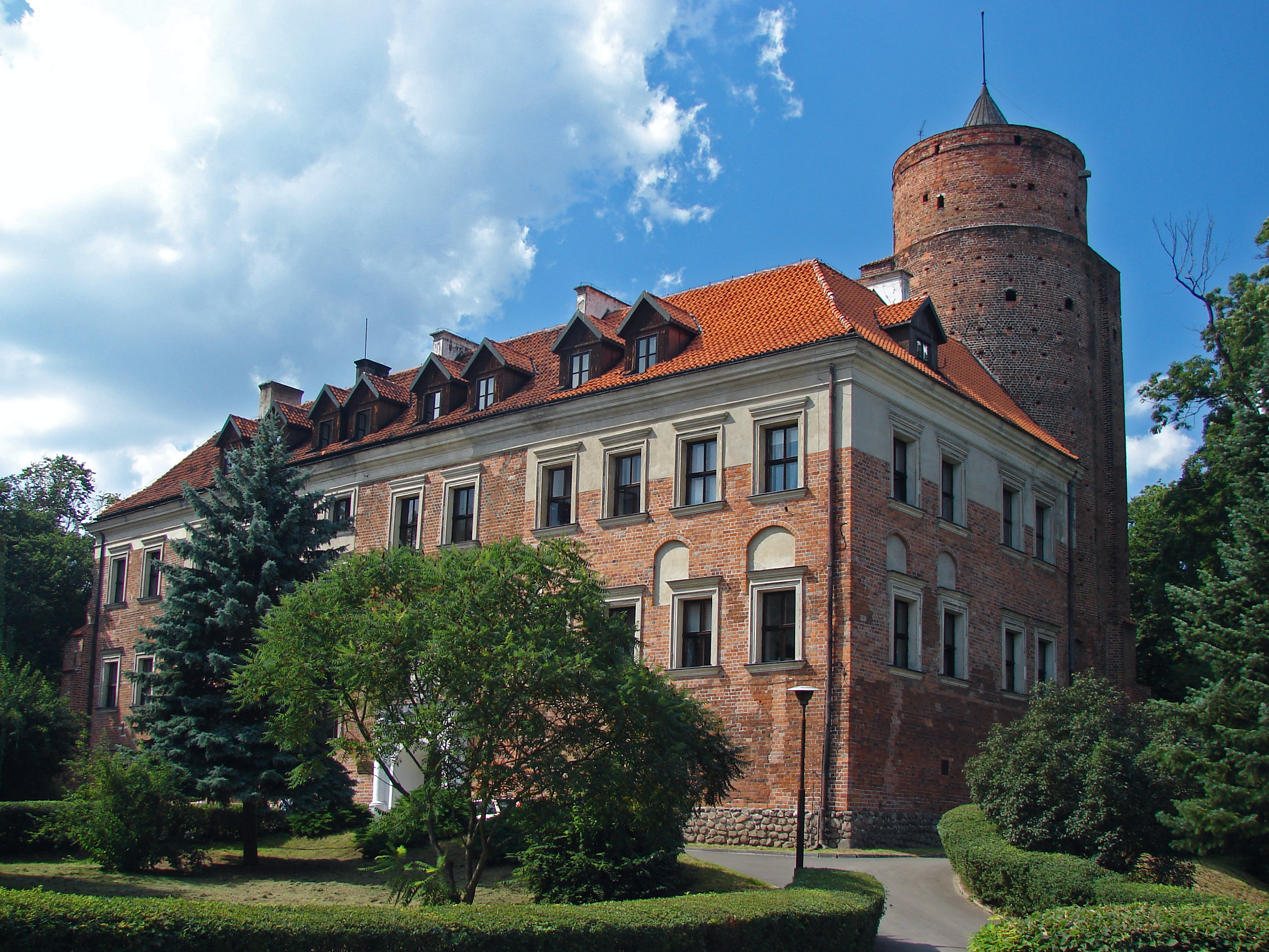
Uniejów Castle

After the war, the family's castle was confiscated, and his parents moved to Bydgoszcz in North Poland. By 1924, Toll had returned to Poland. In 1930 he started work as an apprentice at the National Scientific Institute in Bydgoszcz, and between then and 1934 he studied the lepidoptera of the region, joining the Polish Entomological Society and founding its North Silesian branch. By 1937 he was working at the Silesian Museum at Katowice, and also doing teaching work. His interest in Lepidoptera continued, and after World War II he became the head of the Nature Conservancy Department of the Directorate of State Forests. He became a member of the editorial board of the Microlepidoptera Palaearctica, and was writing the Coleophoridae section, a volume with 1500 pages and 5000 drawings. He had nearly finished this monograph in 1961 when he developed appendicitis, and died of heart failure soon after surgery.

== Research ==
Toll's research was mainly concentrated on the smaller moths of the Microlepidoptera group, specialising from 1929 on the Tortricidae and Nepticulidae families, and from 1939 onwards, on the Coleophoridae family, on which he was still working when he died. He reared many caterpillars at home, and worked out the life cycle of a number of species. He accumulated a large collection of insects, and donated about 40,000 specimens to the Municipal Museum at Rostov. About 100,000 specimens were given to the Natural History Museum of the Institute of Systematics and Evolution of Animals of the Polish Academy of Sciences. He also collected about 8,000 bird eggs and 12,000 butterflies and moths during his time living in Bydgoszcz. He scientifically described over 200 lepidopteran species, and undertook faunal surveys of several parts of Poland.

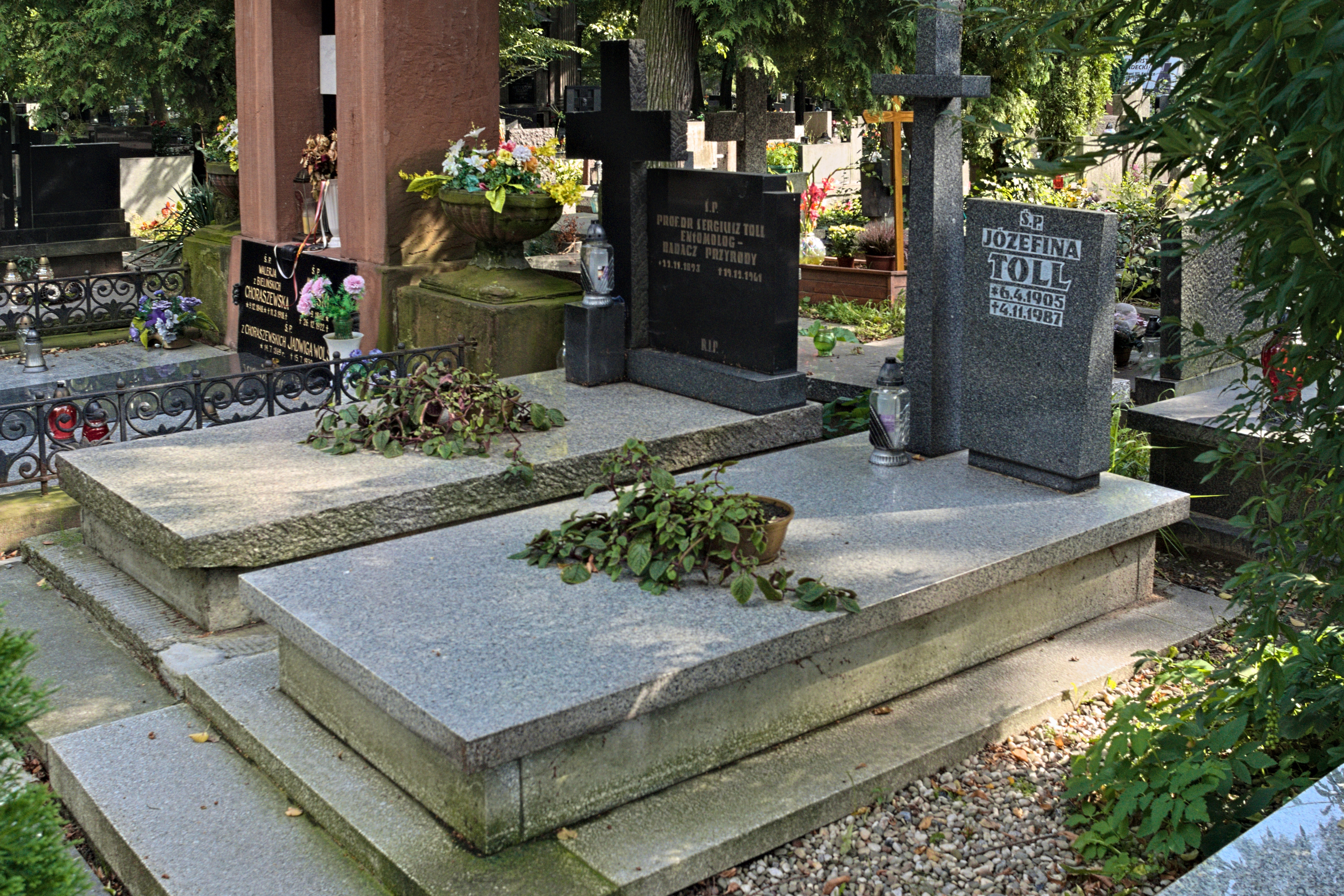
Sergiusz and Józefina Toll's graves

== List of works ==
- Toll, S.Gr.v., 1936. Untersuchung der Genitalien bei Pyrausta purpuralis L. und P. ostrinalis Hb., nebst Beschreibung 11 neuer Microlepidopteren-Arten. Ann. Mus. Zool. Polonici 11:403–413, pis. 47–49.
- Toll, S.Gr.v., 1941, Die Genitalien der europäischen Hyponomeuta. – Zeitschrift des Wiener Entomologen-Vereines (26): 170–176, Pl. XVII-XX.
- Toll, S.Gr.v., 1953. Rodzina Eupistidae Polski.Documenta Physiographica Poloniae 32 (1952): 1–292, pl. 1-38.
