= Grizzly Ridge Wildland Provincial Park =

Protected area in central Alberta, Canada

- IUCN category Ib (wilderness area)
- Location within Alberta Location within Canada Location within M.D. of Lesser Slave River
- Interactive map of Grizzly Ridge Wildland Provincial Park
- Location: Municipal District of Lesser Slave River, Alberta
- Nearest town: Slave Lake
- Coordinates: 55°7′N 115°2′W
- Area: 10,706.07 ha (41.3364 sq mi)
- Established: 14 April 1999
- Governing body: Alberta Forestry, Parks and Tourism

Grizzly Ridge Wildland Provincial Park is a wildland provincial park in northern Alberta, Canada. The park was established on 14 April 1999 and has an area of 10,706.07 hectares (26,455.28 acres; 41.34 sq mi). The park is included in the Upper Athabasca Region Land Use Framework.

== Location ==
The park is primarily in the Municipal District of Lesser Slave River but the western portion is in Big Lakes County. The park is an oblong, irregular shape, running generally north-northeast to south-southwest. The northeast tip of the park is approximately nine kilometres (5.6 mi) southwest of Slave Lake and the southwest tip is approximately nine kilometres (5.6 mi) east of Highway 33. It follows the local ridges and valleys of the plateaus. The park does not have government-recognized road access; however, there was a forest fire observation tower on Sawridge Hill so unimproved trails still lead to that area. The observation tower has been rebuilt as a replica. In addition, previous logging cutblocks and a number of seismic cut lines are still evident from when forestry and petroleum exploration were permitted in the area before the park was established.

== Ecology ==
The park protects a sample of the Upper and Lower Foothills Subregions of the Foothills Natural Region of Alberta. The park is split approximately equally between the two subregions (53 square kilometres (20 sq mi) of Upper Foothills and 54 square kilometres (21 sq mi) of Lower Foothills). In the National Ecological Framework for Canada used by Environment and Climate Change Canada, the park is in both the Driftpile Upland and Swan Hills ecodistricts of the Western Alberta Upland ecoregion in the Boreal Foothills ecoprovince of the Boreal Plains Ecozone. Under the OneEarth classification (previously World Wildlife Fund), the park is in the Alberta–British Columbia foothills forests ecoregion of the Mid-Canada Boreal Plains & Foothill Forests bioregion.

=== Geography ===
The park is in the Swan Hills Uplands, a series of isolated plateaus that rise above the surrounding plains. The park is a flat-topped plateau with an elevation of 1,000 to 1,100 metres (3,300 to 3,600 ft). The lowest elevations in the park, at about 770 metres (2,530 ft), are found along stream valleys as they exit the park. This is compared to the elevation of Lesser Slave Lake at 577.5 metres (1,895 ft); just 10 kilometres (6.2 mi) away.

=== Climate ===
The Köppen climate classification of the park is Continental, Subarctic (Dfc) characterized by long, cold winters, and short, warm to cool summers. Using the data from a nearby and similar weather station (Flat Top Auto), average daily temperatures exceed 10 °C (50 °F) only for June, July, and August while average daily temperatures are less than 0 °C (32 °F) for November through March. The long-run average precipitation on the plateaus for the wettest months, June and July, is over 100 millimetres (3.9 in) per month; conversely, it is less than 40 millimetres (1.6 in) per month from October through April. The plateaus are slightly cooler and receive significantly more precipitation than the neighbouring lowlands; Slave Lake receives 30 millimetres (1.2 in) less precipitation during summer months than the plateaus. The Upper Foothills Subregion, which is represented in the plateaus in the park, has the highest summer precipitation of any Natural Region or Subregion in Alberta.

=== Hydrology ===
The park includes the headwaters of the Adams, Mooney, and Sawridge Creeks. The Adams, Island, Stoney, and Bolder Creeks drain the western slopes, the Assineau River and Mooney Creek drain the north, and the Sawridge Creek drains the eastern flank. There is a small lake in the southeast edge of the park. All drainage ultimately flows into Lesser Slave Lake

=== Natural history themes ===
Natural history themes are a method of organizing information about landscape features: visible landform and biotic complexes; and significant ecosystems within the Subregion. There are seven natural history themes represented in the park.

==== Deciduous birch/aspen and mixedwood forests ====
At lower elevation, on slopes of creek valleys, the deciduous mixedwood forest are widespread. Dominant trees are quaking aspen and Alaska paper birch. White spruce, subalpine fir, balsam poplar, and lodgepole pine will regenerate the understory after forest fires. Speckled alder and American green alder are the dominant tall shrubs with pussy willow, Saskatoon serviceberry, devil's club, pin cherry, and Greene mountain-ash are present in smaller numbers. Shrubs that occur frequently and are dominant in the low shrub layer are prickly rose, American red raspberry, mooseberry viburnum and velvetleaf huckleberry. The dominant grasses and low plants are bluejoint and wild sarsaparilla.

==== Conifer-black spruce ====
Black spruce forests and bogs are found on the plateau throughout the park. Black spruce is the dominant tree in this area with a very dense tree canopy but subalpine fir, Alaska paper birch, and lodgepole pine in small patches never exceeding 10% of the tree cover. Tall shrubs are pussy willow and Greene mountain-ash but exist with low plant density. Dominant low shrubs are bog Labrador tea and velvetleaf huckleberry with lingonberry as a frequent dwarf shrub. Important herbs include cloudberry and strawberryleaf raspberry.

==== Coniferous and coniferous mixedwood. ====
The most widespread of the forest types is the mixed coniferous and coniferous-dominated woodlands. There is greater variety of plant species in these areas. Woodlands on the plateau have a greater proportion of conifers, especially subalpine fir and black spruce. Alaska paper birch and quaking aspen are almost always found but at lower tree density. Density of tall shrubs is low with Greene mountain-ash being the most dominant. The dominant low shrubs are bog Labradorte a, blue huckleberry, and velvetleaf huckleberry. Th velvetleaf huckleberry is the most common. The principal dominant herbs are bluejoint, bunchberry dogwood, and strawberryleaf raspberry.

==== Conifer-Pine ====
There are pure pine woodlands in the southern part of the park. Lodgepole pine is the dominant species with white spruce, subalpine fir, and Alaska paper birch are found in low densities. Greene mountain ash is the dominant tall shrub but the density is also low. Bog Labrador tea and huckleberry are low shrubs with moderate density. The dwarf shrubs are lingonberry in high density and dwarf blueberry in low density. The principal dominant herbs are bunchberry dogwood, bluejoint, and stiff clubmoss.

==== Wetland-Mineral: Graminoid and Wetland-Lake ====
There are few graminoid wetlands in the park. Wetlands and open water are very scarce; there is one small lake in the southeast corner of the park. TRee density is very low. Shrubs include: diamondleaf willow, bog birch, bog Labrador tea, velvetleaf huckleberry, and lingonberry. Bluejoint is proliferous.

==== Wetland-Organic: Open Bog ====
Black spruce bogs occur throughout the plateaux but very few have open untreed areas. Plant diversity in these open bogs is low. Black spruce bogs are typified by organic soils. The dominant species are black spruce and lodgepole pine. These are usually quite stunted. Tamarack is sometimes present. Bog Labrador tea, bog rosemary, and leatherleaf are the dominant low shrubs. Important herbs include star sedge which is significant in the wetter areas, water sedge, tussock cottongrass, cloudberry, small cranberry, and threeleaf false Solomon's seal. Most herbs are typically at low densities. The ground cover in the bog is composed mostly of non-vascular plants, especially Sphagnum.

==== Meadow Complex ====
Meadow complexes occur on several slopes throughout the park. They contain open meadows of bluejoint with Alaska birch and speckled alder scattered throughout. American red raspberry is the most frequent small shrub.

=== Wildlife ===
There are fifteen species of mammals surveyed within the park. Common small mammals include snowshoe hare, American red squirrel, deer mouse. Ungulates include mule and white-tailed deer, wapiti, and moose. Carnivores include coyote, grey wolf, American black bear, Canada lynx, marten, and fisher.

There are sixty species of birds surveyed in the park. There are several species of small birds. Larger birds include ruffed and spruce grouse. Water birds common loon and mallard. Birds of prey include bald eagle, great grey owl, sharp-shinned hawk, and red-tailed hawk.

== Activities ==
The park has no developed facilities so only random backcountry camping and backcountry hiking are permitted. Geocaching is also allowed. Hunting and fishing are allowed under restrictions and with permits. Off-highway vehicle riding is on existing trails only; off-trail use is prohibited.

== See also ==
- List of provincial parks in Alberta
- List of Canadian provincial parks
