= Coleophora paludoides =

Scientific classification
- Kingdom: Animalia
- Phylum: Arthropoda
- Clade: Pancrustacea
- Class: Insecta
- Order: Lepidoptera
- Family: Coleophoridae
- Genus: Coleophora
- Species: C. paludoides

Binomial name
- Coleophora paludoides McDunnough, 1957

Synonyms
- Coleophora paludicola McDunnough, 1946 (Junior primary homonym of Coleophora paludicola Stainton, 1887)

Species of moth

Coleophora paludoides is a moth of the family Coleophoridae. It is found in Canada, including Ontario.

The larvae feed on the leaves of Myrica, Gaylussacia and Comptonia species. They create a spatulate leaf case.
