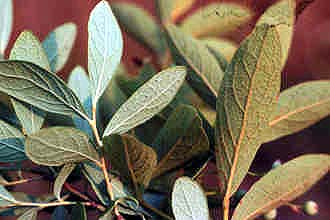

Conservation status
- Secure (NatureServe)

Scientific classification
- Kingdom: Plantae
- Clade: Embryophytes
- Clade: Tracheophytes
- Clade: Angiosperms
- Clade: Eudicots
- Clade: Asterids
- Order: Ericales
- Family: Ericaceae
- Genus: Gaylussacia
- Species: G. frondosa

Binomial name
- Gaylussacia frondosa (L.) Torr. & A.Gray ex Torr. 1843

Synonyms
- List: Vaccinium frondosum L. 1753; Adnaria frondosa (Torr. & A.Gray) Kuntze; Decachaena frondosa (L.) Small; Decamerium frondosum (L.) Nutt.; Vaccinium decamerocarpon Dunal; Vaccinium glaucum Lam.; Vaccinium tomentosum Pursh ex A.Gray; Vaccinium venustum Aiton

= Gaylussacia frondosa =

Berry and plant

Gaylussacia frondosa is a species of flowering plant in the heath family known by the common names dangleberry and blue huckleberry. It is native to the eastern United States, where it occurs from New Hampshire to South Carolina.

This shrub grows up to two meters (80 inches) tall. The plant spreads via rhizome, sprouting up new stems to form colonies. The leaves are up to 6 centimeters (2.4 inches) long by 3 cm (1.2 inches) wide. They are hairy and glandular. The inflorescence contains 1 to 4 flowers that hang on pedicels up to 2 centimeters (0.8 inch) long. The flower is bell-shaped and greenish white. The fruit is a juicy, sweet-tasting drupe which is usually blue but may be black or white.

This plant grows on the Atlantic coastal plain. It grows in wooded areas and next to bogs and swamps. It is common in the pine barrens of New Jersey. It grows on acidic soils low in nutrients. It grows with other related plants such as highbush blueberry (Vaccinium corymbosum), hillside blueberry (V. pallidum), Lyonia spp., sheep-laurel (Kalmia angustifolia), wintergreen (Gaultheria procumbens), dwarf huckleberry (Gaylussacia dumosa), and black huckleberry (G. baccata).

Many animals eat the berries and disperse the seeds.

== Description ==
The stems are round and may be brown, green or red and can have some hairs present.

The bell-shaped and greenish white flowers blooms in late springtime, usually in May and June.

The fruiting period for Gaylussacia frondosa begins in the summer, usually July through August. During this time the loose hanging fruits turn from green to dark blue and black as they mature.

The plant spreads via rhizome within small patches, sprouting up new stems to form colonies. Two or more stems may branch up above the surface from the larger rhizome system below, usually around 2–6 feet apart. These rhizomes are often confined to the humus layer along with the roots of the plants. These branches of rhizomes create larger colonies of the plant over time. New colonies can be created when animals eats the berries and disperse the seeds.

Although the plant grows in similar habitats and looks very similar to the plant Gaylussacia baccata, the leaves of Dangleberry can be distinguished by their often pale green leaves that are typically more pale below than on G. baccata. When squeezed, the leaf of G. baccata produces a glandular, sticky yellow resin from both sides, but only the bottom of G. frondosa produces this resin.

== Taxonomy ==
Gaylussacia frondosa was once more widely circumscribed, encompassing three varieties; however, G. frondosa var. nana and G. frondosa var. tomentosa are now widely recognized at species level, as Gaylussacia nana and Gaylussacia tomentosa.

Synonyms for this plant include both Vaccinium frondosum (L.) and Decachaena frondosa (L.).

== Distribution and habitat ==
This plant is native to the East coast of the United States from New Hampshire and as far west and south as Mississippi. It grows in wooded areas and next to bogs and swamps. It is found in the wetland regions of Atlantic and Gulf Coastal Plain, Eastern Mountains and Piedmont, and Northcentral & Northeast. The wetland indicator status of this shrub is facultative in all three wetland regions it is present in.

It is very common in the pine barrens of New Jersey and the eastern piedmont and coastal plain of North and South Carolina. It most often grows in areas with acidic soils low in nutrients and a shallow organic layer. Blue huckleberry colonies are often found in habitats such as the maritime forest, cedar swamp, hardwood swamp, pine lowland communities. They are also commonly found in disturbed areas such as roadsides and annually burned pinelands.

Gaylussacia frondosa is often found near other similar ericaceous shrubs such as the highbush blueberry (Vaccinium corymbosum), hillside blueberry (V. pallidum), Lyonia spp., sheep-laurel (Kalmia angustifolia), wintergreen (Gaultheria procumbens), dwarf huckleberry (Gaylussacia dumosa), and black huckleberry (G. baccata).[4].

== Ecology ==
Dangleberry is known to provide both food and shelter to wildlife. The low shrub can provide cover for small mammals and birds. Many birds, including sharp-tailed grouse, greater prairie-chicken, wild turkey, and mourning dove as well as mammals like American black bears and raccoon eat the berries. These animals and many more eat the berries and disperse the seeds. The stems can also be eaten by white-tailed deer and cottontail rabbit.

This plant is also known to be valuable for pollinators, especially insect pollinators. These pollinators often feed on the nectar of the pink or white flowers when they bloom from the plant in the spring. Butterflies especially are attracted to Gaylussacia frondosa for its flower nectar. Blue huckleberry is a host plant for the larvae of Callophrys henrici, also known as Henry's Elfin butterfly, which appear from February to May.

== Fire ecology ==
Gaylussacia frondosa is considered to be a highly fire tolerant shrub. Low-intensity fires have been found to encourage vegetative growth in this plant and stimulate sprouting. Although the parts of the plant exposed above the ground are often destroyed by the fires, rhizomes beneath the surface often survive and sprout from dormant buds following fire events. This shrub can be found in many habitats have relatively high fire frequency.

Despite being highly fire tolerant plants, high intensity fires that damage the humus layer may reduce or eliminate Blue Huckleberry from a site by destroying the underlying rhizomes. When the rhizomes below the surface are destroyed, the plant can only be reintroduced to an area through dispersal by animals. In addition, fires that are too frequent could also badly damage these root systems and reduce populations of this shrub.

== Uses ==
When ripe, the fruits found on this plant are edible. The small berries can be picked fresh and eaten raw or cooked. The fruits can be used in pudding.
