= Bog huckleberry =

Bog huckleberry is a common name for several plants and may refer to:

- Gaylussacia bigeloviana, native to coastal plains of eastern North America
- Vaccinium uliginosum, widely distributed throughout the northern hemisphere
