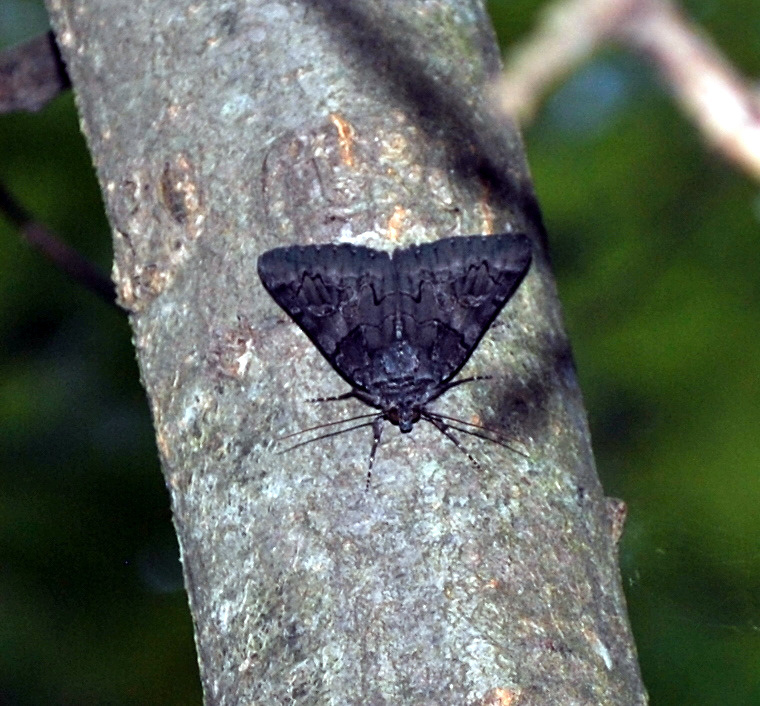

Scientific classification
- Kingdom: Animalia
- Phylum: Arthropoda
- Clade: Pancrustacea
- Class: Insecta
- Order: Lepidoptera
- Superfamily: Noctuoidea
- Family: Erebidae
- Genus: Catocala
- Species: C. antinympha

Binomial name
- Catocala antinympha (Hübner, 1823)

Synonyms
- Ephesia antinympha Hübner, 1823; Catocala affinis Westwood 1837; Catocala melanympha Guenee, 1852; Catocala multiconspicua; Catocala antinympha f. paranympha Reiff, 1919

= Catocala antinympha =

Species of moth

Catocala antinympha, the sweetfern underwing, is a moth of the family Erebidae. It is found from Quebec and Ontario east to Nova Scotia and south to Connecticut, Rhode Island, New York, Massachusetts, Pennsylvania and Maryland.

The wingspan is 45–55 mm. Adults are on wing from July to September. There is one generation per year.

The larvae feed on Comptonia peregrina.
