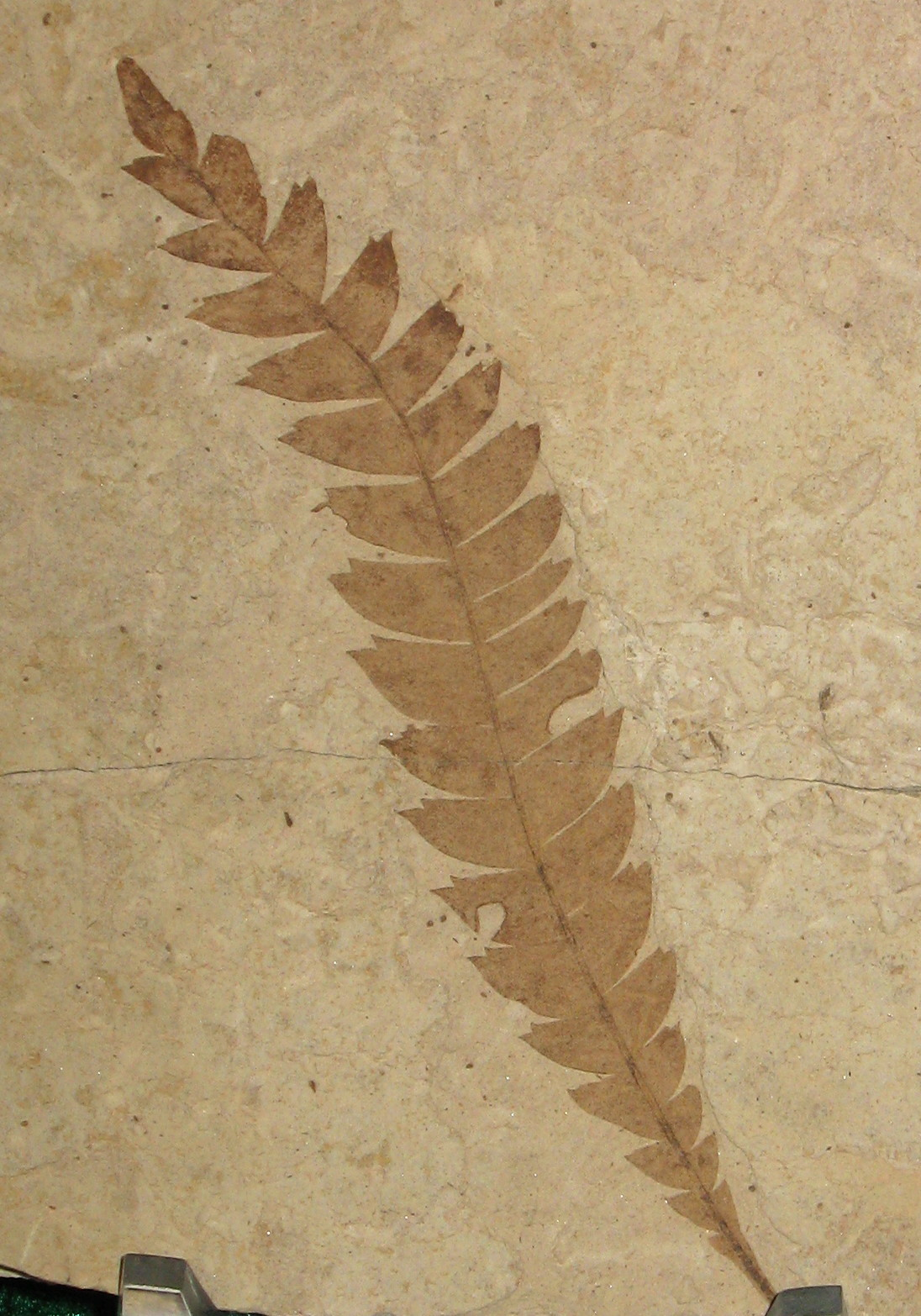
- Fossil leaf SRIC SR 05-09-01

Scientific classification
- Kingdom: Plantae
- Clade: Tracheophytes
- Clade: Angiosperms
- Clade: Eudicots
- Clade: Rosids
- Order: Fagales
- Family: Myricaceae
- Genus: Comptonia
- Species: †C. columbiana

Binomial name
- †Comptonia columbiana Dawson

= Comptonia columbiana =

Comptonia columbiana Temporal range: Ypresian-?Early Oligocene

Extinct species of sweet fern

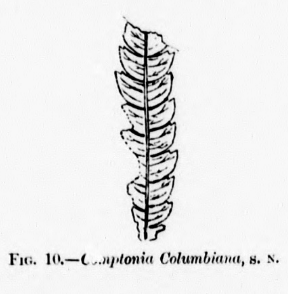
Type illustration from Dawson 1890

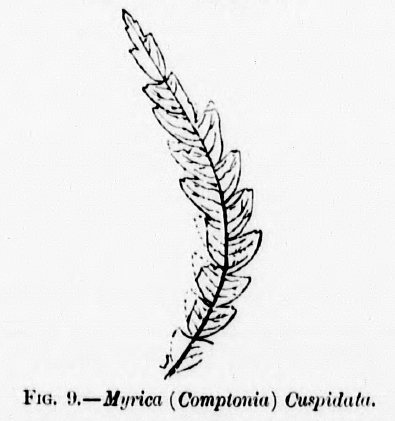
"Myrica (Comptonia) cuspidata)" illustration from Dawson 1890

Comptonia columbiana is an extinct species of sweet fern in the flowering plant family Myricaceae. The species is known from fossil leaves found in the early Eocene deposits of central to southern British Columbia, Canada, plus northern Washington state, United States, and, tentatively, the late Eocene of Southern Idaho and Earliest Oligocene of Oregon, United States.

== Distribution and paleoenvironment ==
Comptonia columbiana was likely an understory plant during the Early Eocene Climatic Optimum and one of the floral components of a number of the Eocene Okanagan Highlands floras. The original specimens are from sites in the Allenby and Tranquille Formations, while subsequent fossil finds have spread the species to other locations in those formations, such as the Falkland flora and McAbee Fossil Beds of the Tranquille Formation and the Thomas Ranch site in the Allenby Formation. Work in other Okanagan Highlands localities has also increased the distribution of C. columbiana, with specimens reported from the Quilchena flora and the Klondike Mountain Formation of Washington state. Tuffs of the Klondike Mountain Formation had been dated to 49.42 ± 0.54 million years ago, the youngest of the Okanagan Highlands sites, though a revised oldest age of 51.2 ± 0.1 million years ago was given based on isotopic data published in 2021.

The Okanagan Highland sites represent upland lake systems that were surrounded by a warm temperate ecosystem with nearby volcanism. The highlands likely had a mesic upper microthermal to lower mesothermal climate, in which winter temperatures rarely dropped low enough for snow, and which were seasonably equitable. The Okanagan Highlands paleoforest surrounding the lakes have been described as precursors to the modern temperate broadleaf and mixed forests of Eastern North America and Eastern Asia. Based on the fossil biotas the lakes were higher and cooler then the coeval coastal forests preserved in the Puget Group and Chuckanut Formation of Western Washington, which are described as lowland tropical forest ecosystems. Estimates of the paleoelevation range between 0.7–1.2 km (0.43–0.75 mi) higher than the coastal forests. This is consistent with the paleoelevation estimates for the lake systems, which range between 1.1–2.9 km (1,100–2,900 m), which is similar to the modern elevation 0.8 km (0.50 mi), but higher.

Estimates of the mean annual temperature have been derived from climate leaf analysis multivariate program (CLAMP) analysis and leaf margin analysis (LMA) of both the Princeton and Republic paleofloras. The CLAMP results after multiple linear regressions for Republic gave a mean annual temperature of approximately 8.0 °C (46.4 °F), while the LMA gave 9.2 ± 2.0 °C (48.6 ± 3.6 °F). Princeton's multiple linear regression CLAMP results gave a slightly lower 5.1 °C (41.2 °F), and the LMA returned a mean annual temperature of 5.1 ± 2.2 °C (41.2 ± 4.0 °F). This is lower than the mean annual temperature estimates given for the coastal Puget Group, which is estimated to have been between 15–18.6 °C (59.0–65.5 °F). The bioclimatic analysis for Republic and Princeton suggest mean annual precipitation amounts of 115 ± 39 cm (45 ± 15 in) and 114 ± 42 cm (45 ± 17 in) respectively.

In his monograph on the Middle Eocene Thunder Mountain Flora near Thunder Mountain, southern central Idaho, Daniel Axelrod (1997) reported Comptonia from two of the sites collected. Fossil Comptonia from Thunder Mountain was first placed in Comptonia hesperia by Roland Brown (1937), a Miocene species first described from the Latah Formation. Further specimens and better dating of the Thunder Mountain flora to an older Eocene age led Axelrod to move the Comptonia fossils to C. columbiana.

Meyer and Manchester (1997) tentatively placed fossils recovered from the John Day Formations Rupelian stage Bridge Creek Flora within Comptonia columbiana. When first studied by Leo Lesquereux and John Strong Newberry the Bridge Creek flora was thought to be Miocene age, while Frank Hall Knowlton placed the flora into the Eocene Clarno Formation in 1902. It was not until Ralph Works Chaney's studies of the fossils in the 1920s that the age was corrected to the Early Oligocene. The Bridge Creek flora is identified as a fully temperate flora, and represents the transition of the Oregon floras from older "borealtropical" forests to more modern forests most similar to the temperate deciduous hardwood assemblages of Southeast Asia.

== History and classification ==
The first fossils for Comptonia columbiana were collected from outcrops of the Allenby Formation along the Similkameen River near Princeton, and from Tranquille Formation outcrops near Kamloops. These were examined and described by John William Dawson (1890) as a new species, along with several fossils Dawson placed into the species "Myrica (Comptonia) cuspidata". The fossils were briefly mentioned again by Edward Wilber Berry (1906) in his revision of the fossil record of Comptonia. Based on the descriptions and illustrations provided by Dawson, Berry included the M. cuspidata fossil in "Comptonia dryandrifolia", and the Comptonia columbiana fossil in Comptonia difformis, both from the Miocene of Europe.

The species received little attention in the following years and was not revisited until renewed collection of fossils from the Klondike Mountain Formation in and around the town of Republic during the late 1970s through the 1980s resulted in additional Comptonia fossils being recovered. In their monograph of the flora, Jack Wolfe and Wesley Wehr (1987) placed the Republic fossils into Comptonia columbiana without comment on Berry's 1906 synonymizations of the original fossils. Wolfe and Wehr viewed the referral of fossils collected by Brown to Comptonia hesperia as incorrect based on the leaf morphology, and treated the fossils as part of a distinct valid species.

Comptonia columbiana has been used in phylogenetic research as the oldest confirmed member of Myricaceae. During the study of Morella rubra and its relationships in the family Liu et al (2015) utilized C. columbiana for a calibration species anchored at 49 mya rooting the Comptonia peregrina outgroup data.

== Paleoecology ==
One fossil leaf recovered from the Klondike Mountain Formation has been described showing damage from insect herbivory on the leaf lobes. The damage, a form of leaf mining has been attributed to the moth family Heliozelidae, possibly a genus close to Antispila by Labandeira (2002) who noted that Comptonia is not a host genus for any living Heliozelidae species. The leaf shows three distinct 5.3 mm × 2.9 mm (0.21 in × 0.11 in) ovoid "windows" where the leaf tissue was cut out, which the final instar would have sewn together with silk to form a case in which it would then pupate.

== Description ==
Dawson (1890) described the incomplete type fossil as 7 cm (2.8 in) by 1 cm (0.39 in) wide. The leaf lobes are alternating, with an upward curve to the tips, and typically two veins in each lobe. The lobes have one to two teeth on the upper apex, and the slightly curving veins angling into the tooth tips. Wolfe and Wehr expanded on the description to note the leaves are simple rather than compound, and notably double serrate.

The Bridge Creek specimens range between 2.1–8.4 cm (0.83–3.31 in) in length and widths between 0.8–1.7 cm (0.31–0.67 in) resulting in an elongated elliptical outline. The leaves are lobed, with the lobe sinuses extending between 1/3 and 1/2 the distance to the main vein. As with the Okanagan Highlands specimens, each lobe displays between one and three apical teeth along the lobe tips. Two secondary veins run from the main vein through the lobes and terminate in the teeth, with one vein forking into an additional vein branch that enters the third tooth where present.

The toothed lobing of Comptonia columbiana was noted by Liang et al (2010) as a distinguishing feature between it and Comptonia naumannii a widespread species from the Asian and Alaskan Miocene to Asian Pliocene. The multiple teeth are also used to distinguish Comptonia columbiana from the living species and all other fossil species by Meyer and Manchester (1997), and as such they tentatively placed the Bridge Creek specimens into the species. They noted the lobe depth of the Oligocene material to be distinct from the Eocene specimens, however, with the Eocene leaves having lobe sinuses that nearly always reached to the main-vein. On the Bridge Creek leaves, the shallower sinuses led Meyer and Manchester to note the possibility that further specimens and study may lead to splitting the Bridge Creek fossils out into a distinct species.

The Thunder Mountain fossils are reported to range between 3–5 cm (1.2–2.0 in) long with a lanceolate outline. The lobes are described as large and rounded to falcate on the upper tips, with occasionally a tooth present, but more often having an entire tip, unlike fossils of the species from the other localities which often have two or three teeth per lobe. Additionally, the Thunder Mountain fossils are reported to have between 2 and 3 secondary veins per lobe, which branch into disorganized venation that terminates with quaternary veins ending in the irregularly shaped areolae formed by the tertiary venation.
