= Coleophora gaylussaciella =

Scientific classification
- Kingdom: Animalia
- Phylum: Arthropoda
- Class: Insecta
- Order: Lepidoptera
- Family: Coleophoridae
- Genus: Coleophora
- Species: C. gaylussaciella

Binomial name
- Coleophora gaylussaciella Heinrich, 1915

Synonyms
- Coleophora peregrinaevorella McDunnough, 1954

Species of moth

Coleophora gaylussaciella is a moth of the family Coleophoridae. It is found in North America, including Virginia and Nova Scotia.

The larvae feed on the leaves of Gaylussacia species, including Gaylussacia baccata, as well as Comptonia peregrina. They create a composite leaf case.
