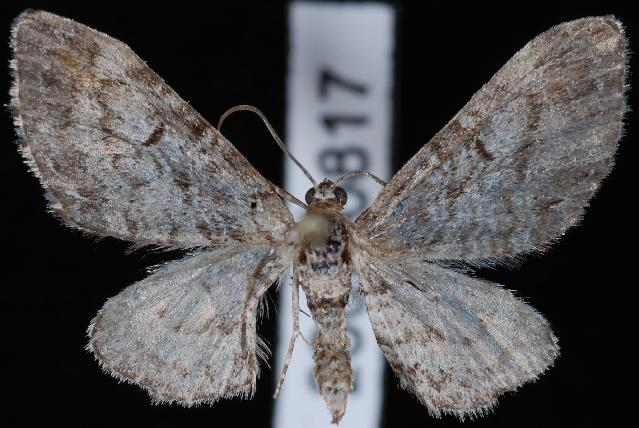

Scientific classification
- Kingdom: Animalia
- Phylum: Arthropoda
- Class: Insecta
- Order: Lepidoptera
- Family: Geometridae
- Genus: Eupithecia
- Species: E. graefi

Binomial name
- Eupithecia graefi (Hulst, 1896)

Subspecies
- E. g. graefi; E. g. tulareata

Synonyms
- Eucymatoge graefi Hulst, 1896; Eupithecia graefii; Eupithecia stikineata Cassino & Swett, 1922; Eucymatoge vancouverata Taylor, 1906; Eucymatoge vancouverensis Pearsall, 1910

= Eupithecia graefi =

Species of moth

Eupithecia graefi, or Graef's pug, is a moth in the family Geometridae. The species was first described by George Duryea Hulst in 1896. It is found in North America from south-western Alberta west to Vancouver Island, north to Alaska and south to California. The habitat consists of wooded areas.

The wingspan is 17–25 mm. Adults are mostly on wing in summer, but have been recorded from April to November.

The larvae feed on Arbutus and Gaylussacia species, and possibly also Thuja and Pseudotsuga species. The larvae are variable in colour, ranging from green to rosy pink and reddish pink.

== Subspecies ==
- Eupithecia graefi graefi
- Eupithecia graefi tulareata Cassino & Swett, 1922 (High Sierras of southern California)
