= Blue huckleberry =

"Blue huckleberry" refers to either of two plants native to North America:

- Gaylussacia frondosa, Eastern United States - a dangleberry
- Vaccinium corymbosum, Eastern North America
- Vaccinium deliciosum (also called Cascade bilberry or Cascade huckleberry), Western United States and British Columbia, Canada - a bilberry
