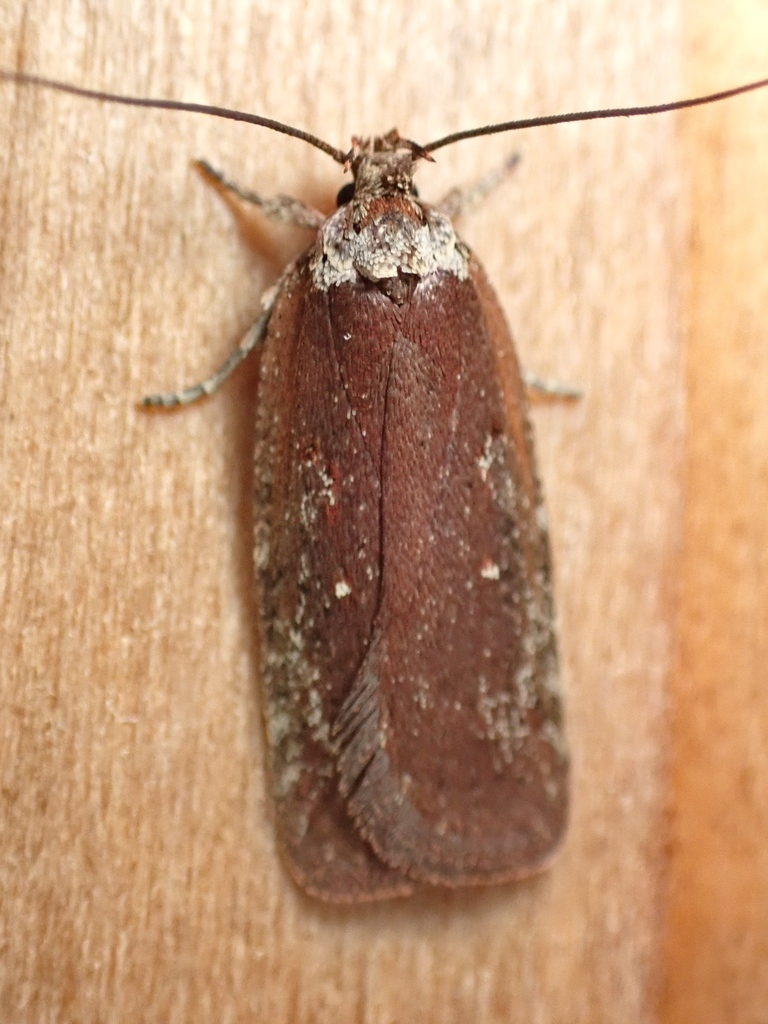

Scientific classification
- Kingdom: Animalia
- Phylum: Arthropoda
- Clade: Pancrustacea
- Class: Insecta
- Order: Lepidoptera
- Family: Depressariidae
- Genus: Agonopterix
- Species: A. walsinghamella

Binomial name
- Agonopterix walsinghamella (Busck, 1902)

Synonyms
- Depressaria walsinghamella Busck, 1902; Depressaria fernaldella Walsingham, 1889 (preocc.)

= Agonopterix walsinghamella =

Walsingham's agonopterix moth

Species of moth

Agonopterix walsinghamella, or Walsingham's agonopterix moth, is a moth in the family Depressariidae. It was described by August Busck in 1902. It is found in North America, where it has been recorded from the north-eastern United States and Canada.

The wingspan is 20–22 mm. The forewings are deep crimson red, irrorated (speckled) with black and cinereous (ash-gray) scales. The costa is broadly tawny red nearly to the apex, with veins nine to twelve strongly indicated by cinereous and irrorated with black scales and with poorly defined fuscous spots on the extreme edge. The discal spots are white. The first discal spot at the basal third is edged with carmine and the second at the end of the cell is preceded by a few carmine scales. The hindwings are light fuscous.

The larvae feed on Comptonia peregrina, Myrica aspleniifolia and Myrica gale.
