= Gaylussacia orocola =

Conservation status
- Critically Imperiled (NatureServe)

Scientific classification
- Kingdom: Plantae
- Clade: Tracheophytes
- Clade: Angiosperms
- Clade: Eudicots
- Clade: Asterids
- Order: Ericales
- Family: Ericaceae
- Genus: Gaylussacia
- Species: G. orocola

Binomial name
- Gaylussacia orocola (Small) Camp 1935

Synonyms
- Lasiococcus orocola Small 1933

Species of flowering plant

Gaylussacia orocola, is a plant species native only to the southern Appalachians of western North Carolina. This plant grows only in Mountain Bogs, severely limiting available habitat. This plant has many common names which may be shared with other species. It is known to The North Carolina Natural Heritage Program as the Appalachian dwarf huckleberry and The North Carolina Botanical Garden knows it as the Blue Ridge bog huckleberry. It may also be referred to as the Gopherberry, Blue Ridge huckleberry, or Dwarf Huckleberry.

== Description ==
Gaylussacia orocola is an erect, branched shrub. It has oval, leathery leaves which feature "mucronate" tips. The uppermost leaves exposed to the sun may become red tinged. It has white bell-shaped flowers, which grow in clusters on the stems. The plant's juicy berries are a deep blue-black, adored by birds and mammals, and considered essentially tasteless.

== Conservation ==
According to The North Carolina Natural Heritage Program (NCNHP), G. orocola has legally protected status through the North Carolina Plant Conservation Program (NCPCP) and is listed as Endangered. The NCNHP has also provided an additional status of "Significantly Rare-Limited", indicating that, as an endemic species, the preponderance of G. orocola distribution is in North Carolina and its fate depends largely on conservation within the state. As of 2021, the species has been given a state and global rank of "Critically Imperiled" indicating 5 or fewer occurrences or <1000 remaining individuals making the species especially vulnerable to extinction.

Despite this state assessment of Endangered status, Gaylussacia orocola has not been evaluated for The International Union for Conservation of Nature (IUCN)'s Red List nor does it have national protected status. The Centre for Plant Conservation identified the species as being at extreme risk of extinction due to habitat loss. While it was previously found in Avery, Buncombe, Haywood, & Macon counties, as of 2021 occurrences could only be verified in Transylvania & Henderson counties.

In an effort to save the plant from extinction, The North Carolina Botanical Garden has collected 2,136 seeds from two of the three known sites where the plant still occurs as part of their rare plant seed banking initiative. Seeds are stored at the Botanical Garden's own seed bank and at the National Laboratory for Genetic Resource Preservation in Colorado.
