= Bucculatrix paroptila =

Scientific classification
- Kingdom: Animalia
- Phylum: Arthropoda
- Clade: Pancrustacea
- Class: Insecta
- Order: Lepidoptera
- Family: Bucculatricidae
- Genus: Bucculatrix
- Species: B. paroptila

Binomial name
- Bucculatrix paroptila Braun, 1963

Species of moth

Bucculatrix paroptila is a moth in the family Bucculatricidae. It is found in North America, where it has been recorded from Maine, Massachusetts, Ontario and Nova Scotia. It was described by Annette Frances Braun in 1963.

The larvae feed on Comptonia peregrina and Myrica gale.
