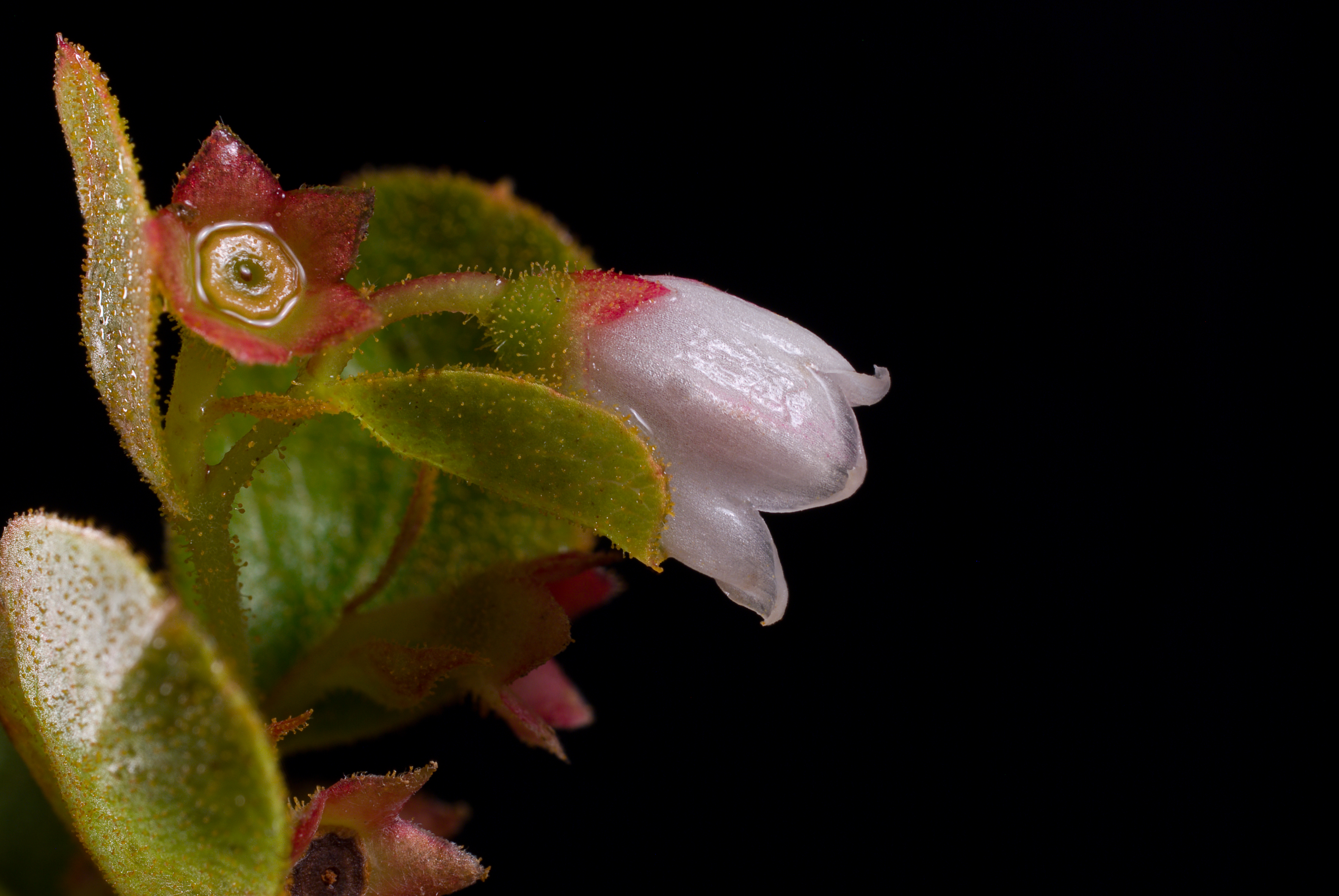

Conservation status
- Secure (NatureServe)

Scientific classification
- Kingdom: Plantae
- Clade: Tracheophytes
- Clade: Angiosperms
- Clade: Eudicots
- Clade: Asterids
- Order: Ericales
- Family: Ericaceae
- Genus: Gaylussacia
- Species: G. dumosa

Binomial name
- Gaylussacia dumosa (Andrews) A.Gray 1846

Synonyms
- Adnaria dumosa (Torr. & A.Gray) Kuntze; Decamerium dumosum (Andr.) Nutt.; Decamerium hirtellum (Aiton) Nutt.; Decamerium hirtellum var. griseum Ashe; Decamerium hirtellum f. minimum Ashe; Gaylussacia dumosa (Andrews) A.Gray; Gaylussacia dumosa var. humilis Zabel; Gaylussacia hirtella (W.T.Aiton) Torr. & A.Gray; Lasiococcus dumosus (Andrews) Small; Vaccinium dumosum Andrews 1800 (basionym); Vaccinium dumosum var. humile P.Watson

= Gaylussacia dumosa =

Berry and plant

Gaylussacia dumosa is a species of flowering plant in the heath family known by the common names dwarf huckleberry, bush huckleberry, and gopherberry. It is native to eastern North America from Newfoundland to Louisiana and Florida. It occurs along the coastal plain and in the mountains.

This shrub branches from the base and grows erect to a maximum height around 75 centimeters (30 inches). It grows from a rhizome. The young twigs are coated in curly hairs. The deciduous leaves are oval, leathery, and glandular. The inflorescence is a raceme of bell-shaped flowers. The fruit is a berry. The plant reproduces by seed and by sprouting from the rhizome. It sprouts readily after episodes of wildfire.

This plant grows in dry or moist habitat types. It can be found in forests, pine barrens, pine flatwoods, bogs, and bays. It grows alongside plants such as eastern red cedar (Juniperus virginiana), tamarack (Larix laricina), redbay (Persea borbonia), sweetbay (Magnolia virginiana), flowering dogwood (Cornus florida), dangleberry (Gaylussacia frondosa), yaupon (Ilex vomitoria), fetterbush (Leucothoe racemosa), and blueberry (Vaccinium spp.).

The epithet 'dumosa' means bushy or shrubby.
