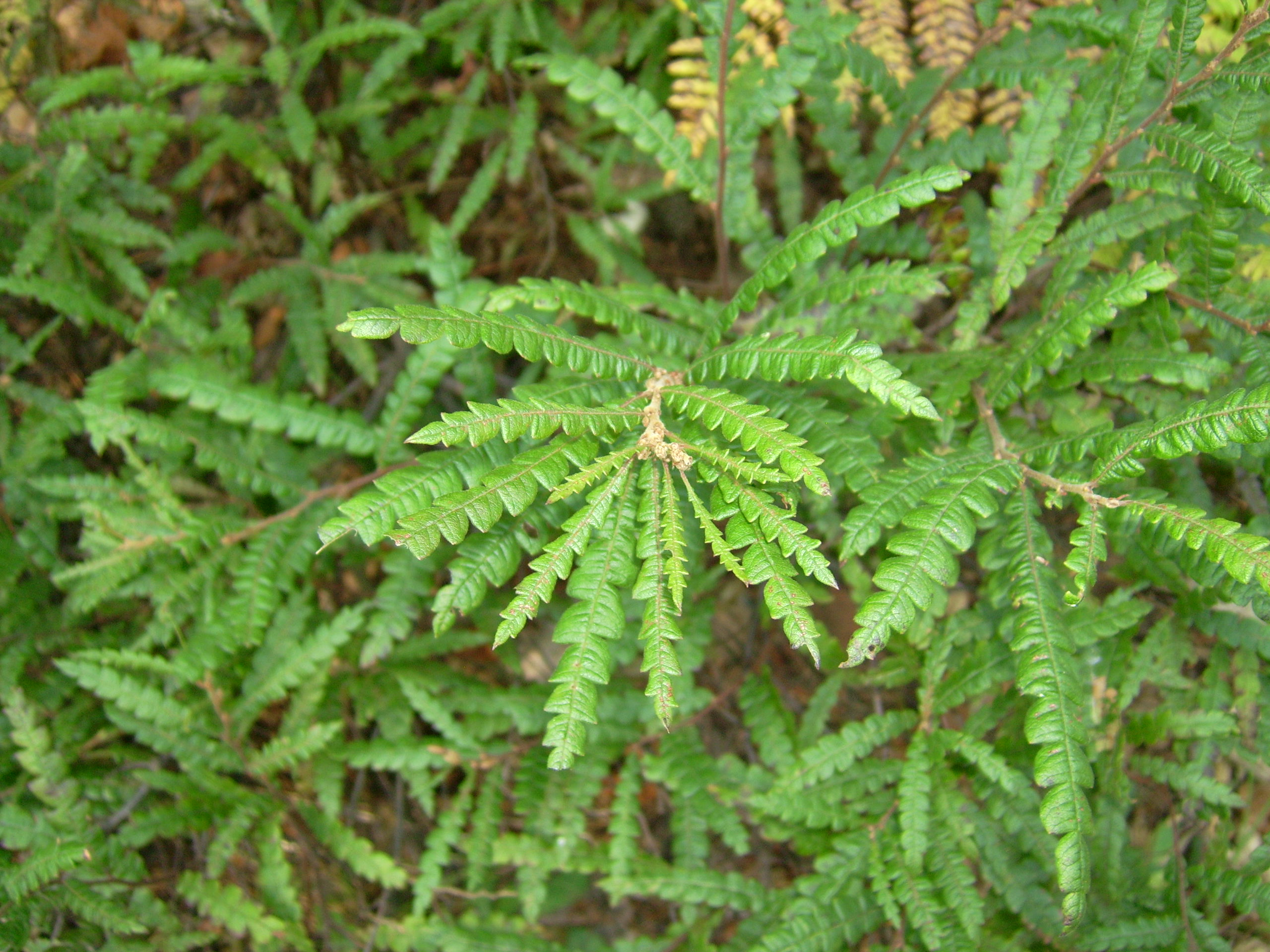

Conservation status
- Secure (NatureServe)

Scientific classification
- Kingdom: Plantae
- Clade: Tracheophytes
- Clade: Angiosperms
- Clade: Eudicots
- Clade: Rosids
- Order: Fagales
- Family: Myricaceae
- Genus: Comptonia
- Species: C. peregrina

Binomial name
- Comptonia peregrina (L.) Coult.

Synonyms
- Comptonia aspleniifolia (L.) L'Hér.; Comptonia ceterach Mirb.; Comptonia peregrina var. aspleniifolia (L.) Fernald; Comptonia peregrina var. tomentosa A.Chev.; Liquidambar aspleniifolia (L.) L.; Liquidambar peregrina L.; Myrica aspleniifolia L.; Myrica aspleniifolia var. tomentosa (A.Chev.) Gleason; Myrica comptonia C.DC.; Myrica peregrina (L.) Kuntze

= Comptonia peregrina =

Sweetfern

Species of plant native to eastern North America

Comptonia peregrina is a species of flowering plant in the family Myricaceae native to eastern North America. It is the only extant (living) species in the genus Comptonia, although some extinct species are placed in the genus.

== Etymology ==
The common name is sweetfern or sweet-fern (although it is not a fern), or in Quebec, comptonie voyageuse. The genus Comptonia is named in honor of Rev. Henry Compton, 18th century bishop of Oxford.

The species name peregrina literally means one that travels. Compare the plant's Quebec French name, comptonie voyageuse: "traveling comptonia."

== Taxonomy ==
The species was first described, as Liquidambar peregrina, by Carl Linnaeus in 1753 in the second volume of Species Plantarum. Further on in the same volume, he describes Myrica aspleniifolia as a different species (with the epithet spelt asplenifolia (Note: Article 60.10 of the International Code of Nomenclature for algae, fungi, and plants requires names not formed in accordance with the article to be corrected. The epithet aspleniifolia is formed from Asplenium and folia, so must be constructed as aspleni+i+folia.)). In 1763, he changed his mind concerning Myrica aspleniifolia, and it became Liquidambar aspleniifolia, and so in the same genus as Liquidambar peregrina.

In 1789, Charles Louis L'Héritier placed Linnaeus's original Myrica aspleniifolia in his new genus Comptonia. In 1894, John M. Coulter transferred Linnaeus's Liquidambar peregrina to Comptonia and treated Linnaeus's Myrica aspleniifolia as a synonym.

== Description ==
Comptonia peregrina is the only extant (living) species in the genus. It is a deciduous shrub, growing to 1.5 m (4.9 ft) tall. Its leaves are linear to lanceolate, 3–15 cm (1.2–5.9 in) long and 0.3–3 cm (0.1–1.2 in) broad, with a lobed margin; the leaves give off a sweet odor, especially when crushed. Plants are monoecious with separate unisexual flowers. The staminate flowers grow in clusters at the ends of branches, and are up to 5 cm (2.0 in) long. The pistillate flowers are only 5 mm (0.2 in) but elongate when the fruits form, reaching 5 cm (2.0 in).

== Distribution and habitat ==
Comptonia peregrina is native to eastern North America, from the Canadian provinces of Ontario and Quebec in the north, east to Nova Scotia, to extreme northern Georgia in the south, and west to Minnesota. It tends to grow on dry sandy sites and is associated with pine stands.

== Ecology ==
Comptonia peregrina is used as a food plant by the larvae of some Lepidoptera species, including Bucculatrix paroptila, grey pug, setaceous Hebrew character, Io moth, and several Coleophora case-bearers: C. comptoniella, C. peregrinaevorella (which feeds exclusively on Comptonia), C. persimplexella, C. pruniella and C. serratella. It is a non-legume nitrogen fixer for wet soils, with resistance to drought.

== Uses and consumption ==
The plant produces a bristly burr that contains 1 to 4 edible nutlets. The aromatic leaves (fresh or dried) are used to make a tea. Canadian author Catharine Parr Traill includes it in her book The Female Emigrant's Guide in a list of substitutes for China tea. "When boiled," she notes, "it has a slightly resinous taste, with a bitter flavour, that is not very unpleasant." Mistaking it for a fern, she says that it is in high repute "among the Yankee and old Canadian housewifes (sic)." Tea made from the plant has been said to treat the effects of poison ivy when applied to the affected area. The plant can be used as a seasoning.
