= Gaylussacia cinerea =

Scientific classification
- Kingdom: Plantae
- Clade: Tracheophytes
- Clade: Angiosperms
- Clade: Eudicots
- Clade: Asterids
- Order: Ericales
- Family: Ericaceae
- Genus: Gaylussacia
- Species: G. cinerea

Binomial name
- Gaylussacia cinerea Taub.

Synonyms
- Gaylussacia thymelaeoides var. latifolia Meisn.

Species of flowering plant

Gaylussacia cinerea is a species of flowering plant in the family Ericaceae. It is native to southeastern Brazil.
