= Coleophora multicristatella =

Scientific classification
- Kingdom: Animalia
- Phylum: Arthropoda
- Class: Insecta
- Order: Lepidoptera
- Family: Coleophoridae
- Genus: Coleophora
- Species: C. multicristatella

Binomial name
- Coleophora multicristatella McDunnough, 1954

Species of moth

Coleophora multicristatella is a moth of the family Coleophoridae. It is found in Canada, including Nova Scotia.

The larvae feed on the leaves of Gaylussacia baccata and Rhododendron canadense. They create a composite leaf case.
