= Coleophora comptoniella =

Birch casebearer moth

Scientific classification
- Kingdom: Animalia
- Phylum: Arthropoda
- Clade: Pancrustacea
- Class: Insecta
- Order: Lepidoptera
- Family: Coleophoridae
- Genus: Coleophora
- Species: C. comptoniella

Binomial name
- Coleophora comptoniella (McDunnough, 1926)

Synonyms
- Haploptilia comptoniella McDunnough, 1926; Coleophora betulivora McDunnough, 1946

Species of moth

Coleophora comptoniella, the birch casebearer moth, is a moth of the family Coleophoridae. It is found in Canada, including Nova Scotia and Ontario.

The larvae feed on the leaves of Comptonia, Myrica, Betula, Alnus species. They create a spatulate leaf case.
