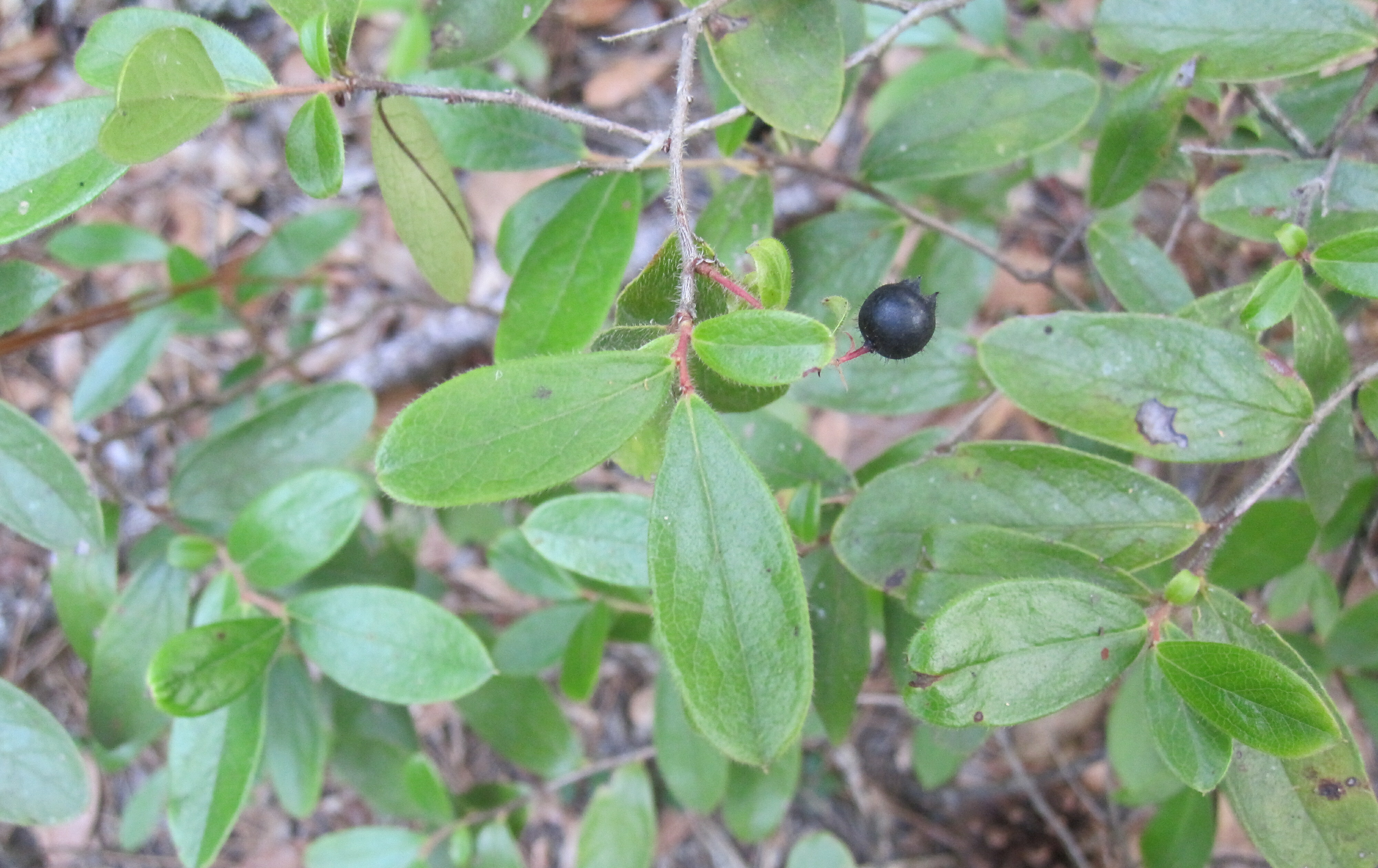

Scientific classification
- Kingdom: Plantae
- Clade: Tracheophytes
- Clade: Angiosperms
- Clade: Eudicots
- Clade: Asterids
- Order: Ericales
- Family: Ericaceae
- Genus: Gaylussacia
- Species: G. mosieri

Binomial name
- Gaylussacia mosieri Small 1927

Synonyms
- Lasiococcus mosieri (Small) Small; Gaylussacia dumosa var. hirtella Chapm.

= Gaylussacia mosieri =

Berry and plant

Gaylussacia mosieri, the hirsute huckleberry or woolly huckleberry, is a plant species native to the coastal plains of the southeastern United States (Louisiana, Mississippi, Alabama, Georgia, Florida).

Gaylussacia mosieri is a shrub up to 150 cm (5 feet) tall, sometimes forming small colonies. Shoots are covered with reddish hairs. Flowers are in groups of 4–8, white, or pink. Fruits are black, sweet and juicy. The species grows in swamps and marshes.
