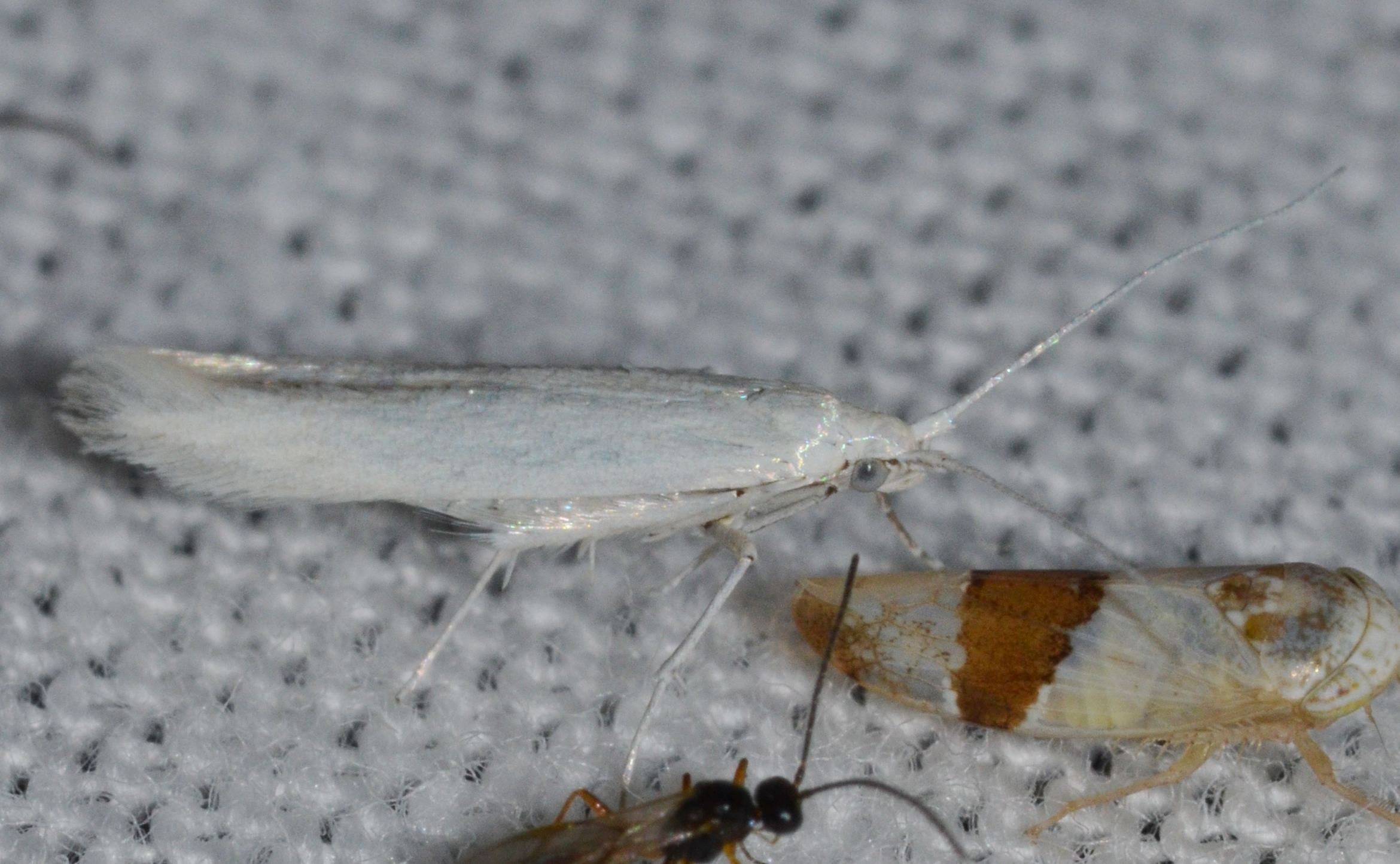

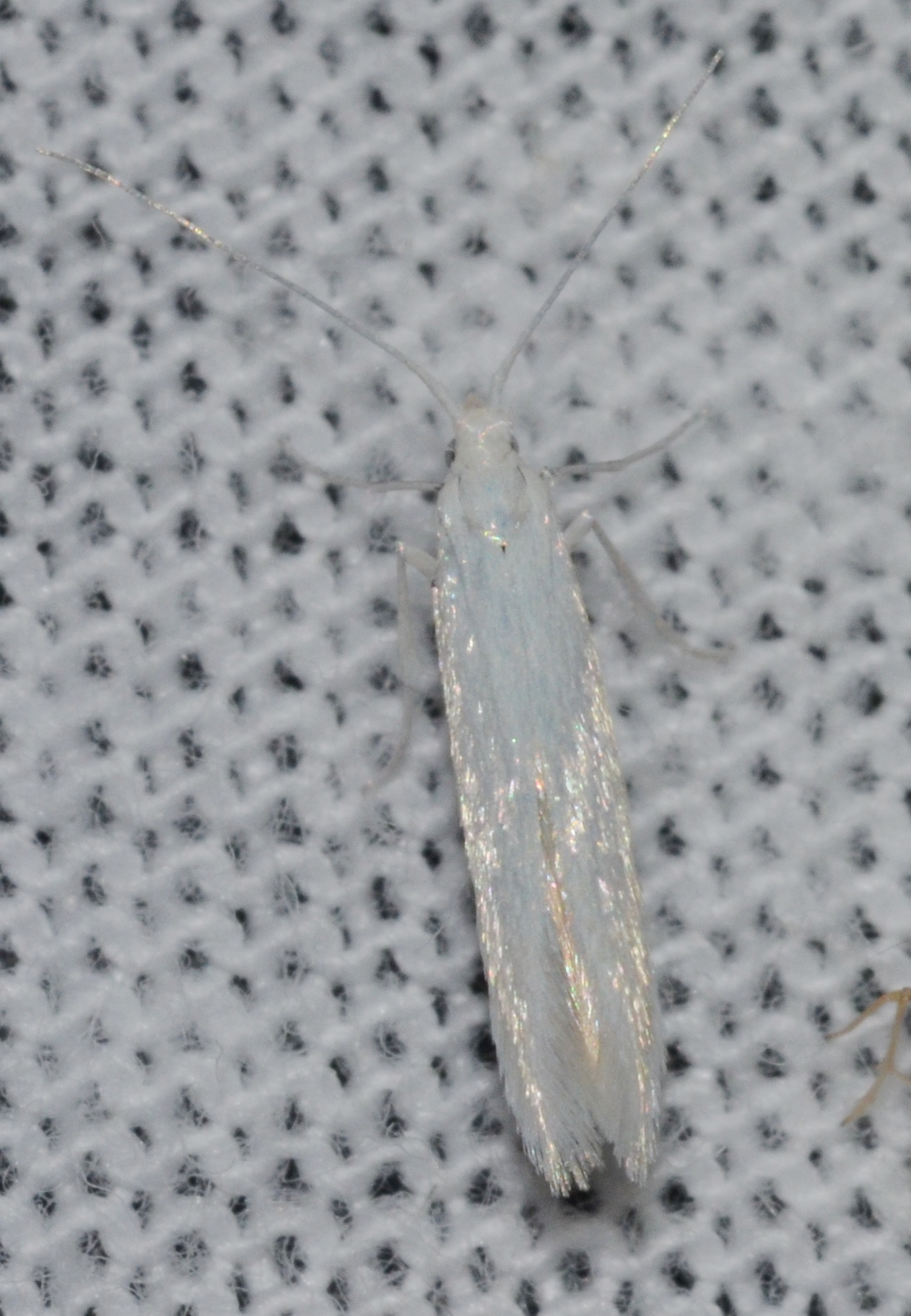

Scientific classification
- Kingdom: Animalia
- Phylum: Arthropoda
- Clade: Pancrustacea
- Class: Insecta
- Order: Lepidoptera
- Family: Coleophoridae
- Genus: Coleophora
- Species: C. pruniella

Binomial name
- Coleophora pruniella Clemens, 1861

Synonyms
- Coleophora nigralineella Chambers, 1876; Coleophora ochrella Chambers, 1878; Coleophora volckei Volck, 1917; Coleophora volckei Heinrich, 1918; Coleophora piperata Braun, 1925; Coleophora innotabilis Braun, 1927

= Coleophora pruniella =

Species of moth

Coleophora pruniella, the cherry casebearer moth, is a moth of the family Coleophoridae. It is found in North America, including New York, Oklahoma, Utah, Ontario and British Columbia.

The wingspan is about 11 mm.

The larvae feed on the leaves of Prunus, Rosa, Amelanchier, Betula, Alnus, Juglans, Myrica, Comptonia, Salix, Populus and Fraxinus species.
