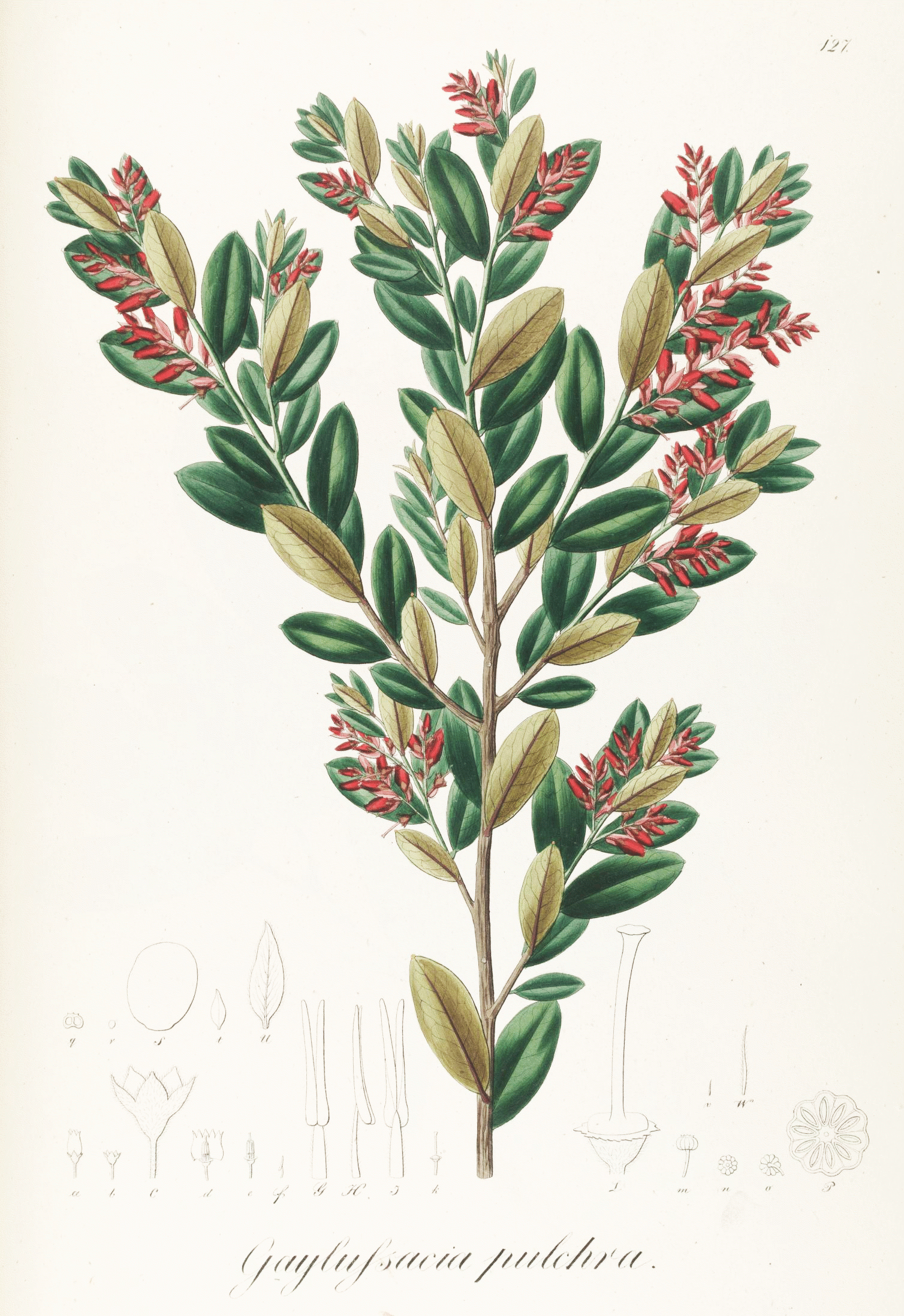
- 1827 illustration

Scientific classification
- Kingdom: Plantae
- Clade: Tracheophytes
- Clade: Angiosperms
- Clade: Eudicots
- Clade: Asterids
- Order: Ericales
- Family: Ericaceae
- Genus: Gaylussacia
- Species: G. pulchra

Binomial name
- Gaylussacia pulchra Pohl 1828 not Miq. ex Meisn. 1863

Synonyms
- Adnaria pulchra (Pohl) Kuntze

= Gaylussacia pulchra =

Species of fruit and plant

Gaylussacia pulchra is a plant species in the family Ericaceae. It is native to the States of Bahia and Minas Gerais in eastern Brazil.

Gaylussacia pulchra is a woody, branching shrub. Leaves are lance-shaped, dark green on the upper surface, whitish on the underside. Flowers are scarlet, tubular, in axillary racemes. Fruits have 10 chambers, each with one seed.
