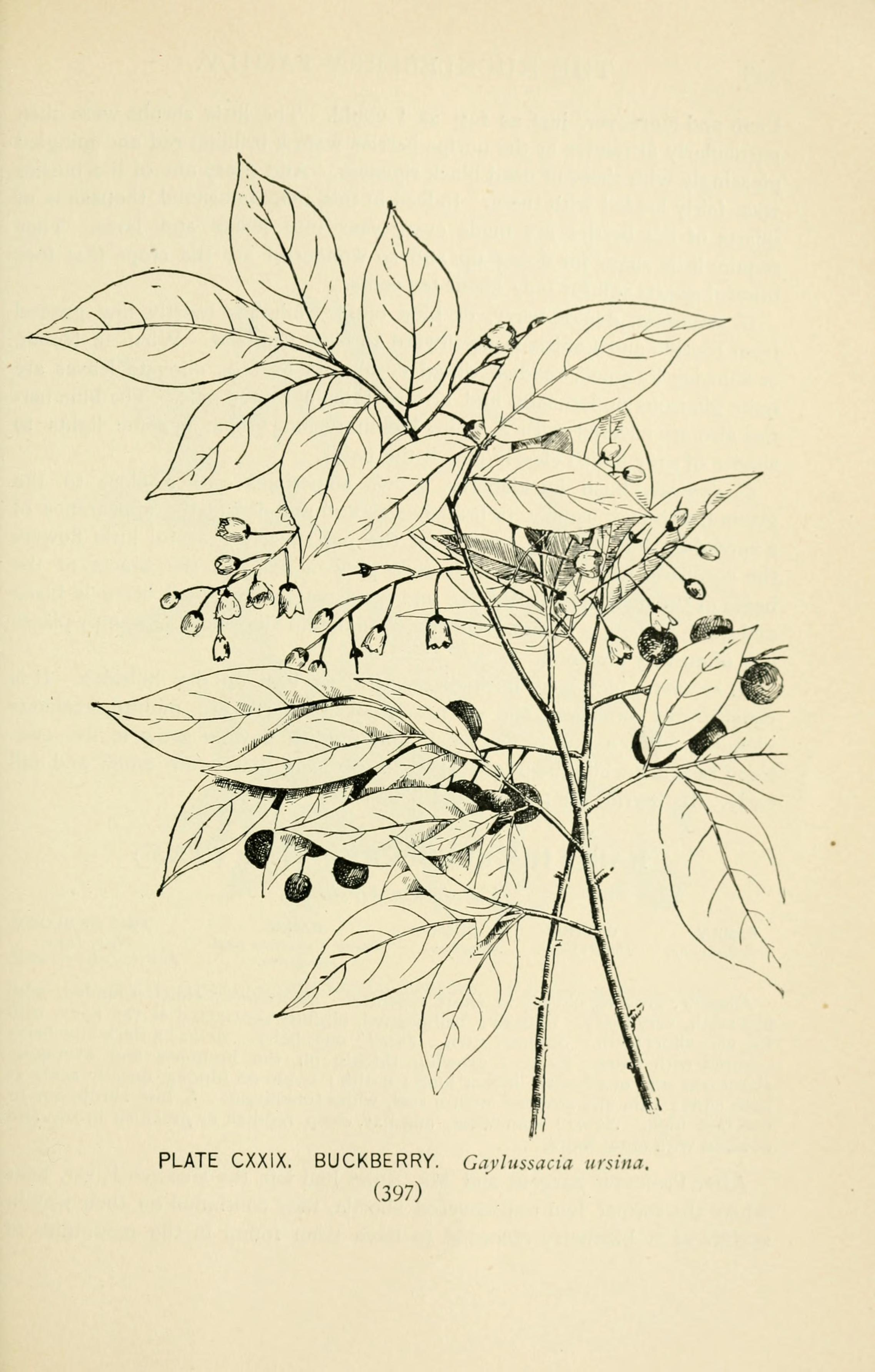

Scientific classification
- Kingdom: Plantae
- Clade: Tracheophytes
- Clade: Angiosperms
- Clade: Eudicots
- Clade: Asterids
- Order: Ericales
- Family: Ericaceae
- Genus: Gaylussacia
- Species: G. ursina

Binomial name
- Gaylussacia ursina (M.A.Curtis) Torr. & A.Gray 1846

Synonyms
- Vaccinium ursinum M.A.Curtis 1843; Adnaria ursina (Torr. & A.Gray) Kuntze; Decachaena ursina (M.A.Curtis) Small; Decamerium ursinum (M.A.Curtis) Ashe

= Gaylussacia ursina =

Berry and plant

Gaylussacia ursina, the bear huckleberry, is a plant species native to the southern Appalachians (Georgia, Tennessee, and the Carolinas).

Gaylussacia ursina is a shrub up to 200 cm (80 inches) tall, sometimes forming huge colonies. Flowers are in groups of 4–6, greenish-white. Fruits are black, sweet and juicy.
