= Coleophora persimplexella =

Scientific classification
- Kingdom: Animalia
- Phylum: Arthropoda
- Class: Insecta
- Order: Lepidoptera
- Family: Coleophoridae
- Genus: Coleophora
- Species: C. persimplexella

Binomial name
- Coleophora persimplexella McDunnough, 1955

Species of moth

Coleophora persimplexella is a moth of the family Coleophoridae. It is found in Canada, including Nova Scotia.

The larvae feed on the leaves of Comptonia, Betula and Alnus species. They create a lobe case.
