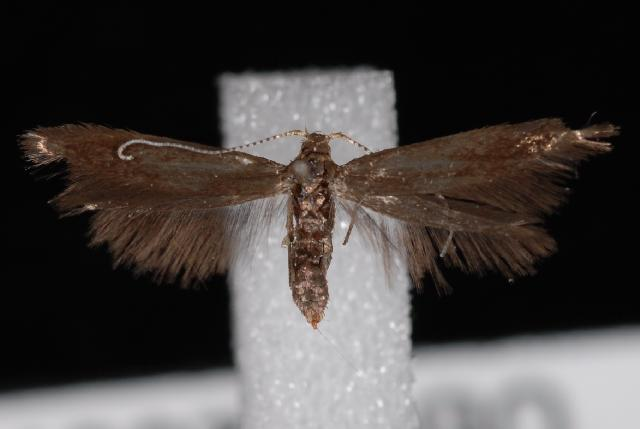
- Imago
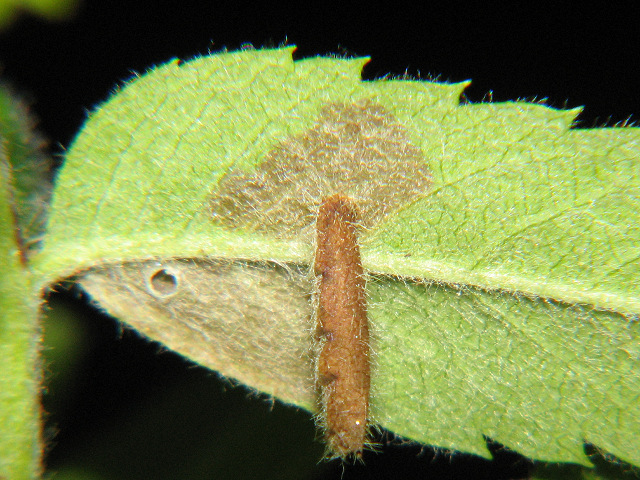
- Case

Scientific classification
- Kingdom: Animalia
- Phylum: Arthropoda
- Class: Insecta
- Order: Lepidoptera
- Family: Coleophoridae
- Genus: Coleophora
- Species: C. serratella

Binomial name
- Coleophora serratella (Linnaeus, 1761)

Synonyms
- List: Tinea serratella Linnaeus, 1761; Coleophora fuscedinella Zeller, 1849; Coleophora metallicella Hodgkinson, 1892; Coleophora aethiopiformis Strand, 1902; Coleophora salmani Heinrich, 1929; Coleophora insulicola McDunnough, 1946 (Junior primary homonym of Coleophora insulicola Toll, 1942); Coleophora parasalmani Oudejans, 1971 (replacement name for Coleophora insulicola McDunnough, 1946)

= Coleophora serratella =

Species of moth

Coleophora serratella is a moth of the family Coleophoridae. It is found in Europe (except the Balkan Peninsula), Japan (Hokkaido) and North America.

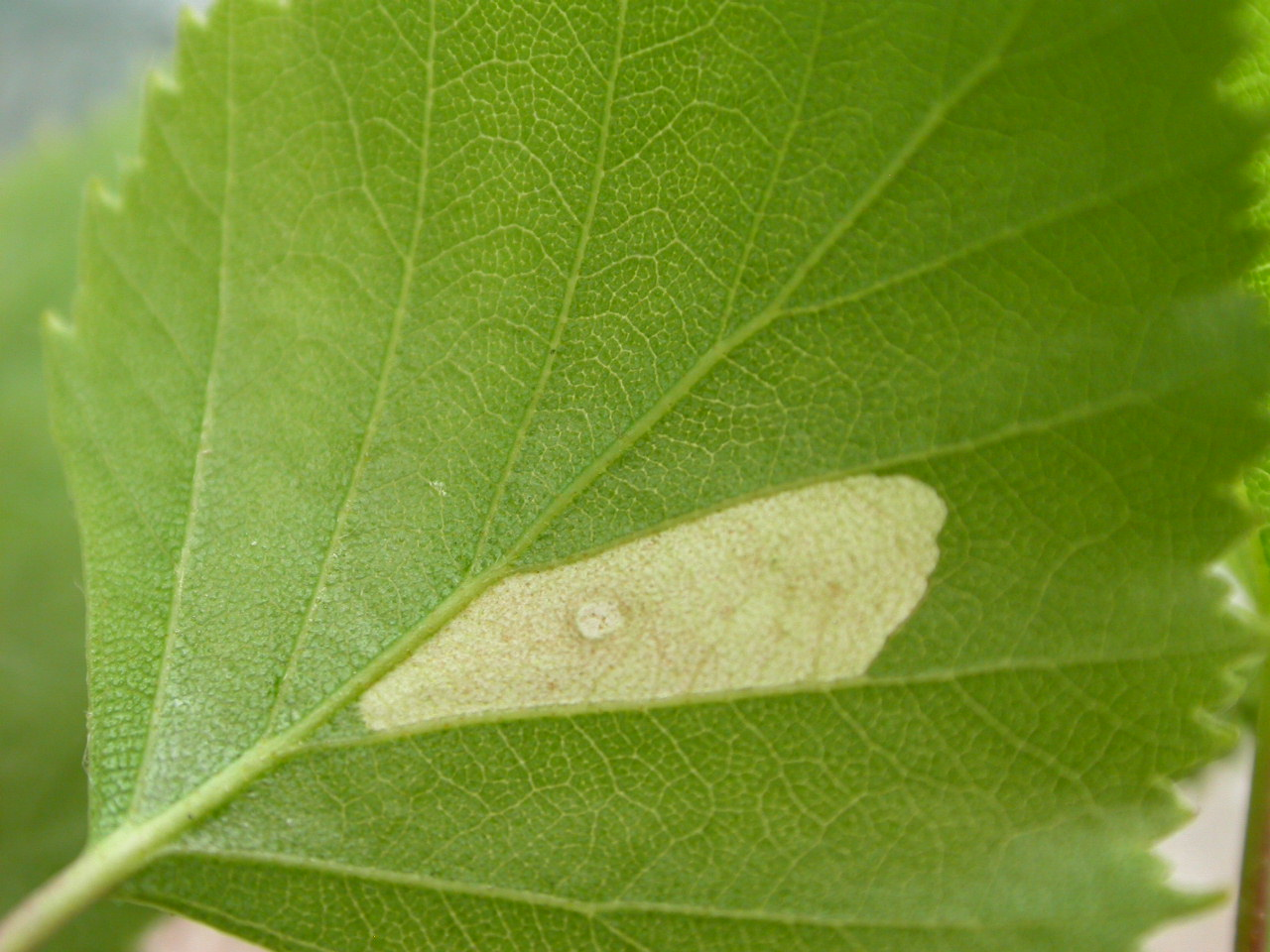
Larval feeding signs

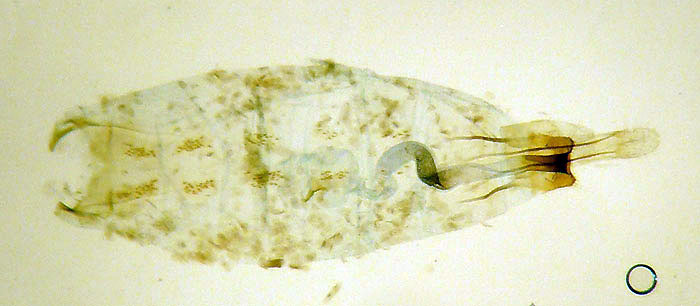
Pupa

== Description ==
The wingspan is 11–14 millimetres (0.43–0.55 in). Coleophora species have narrow blunt to pointed forewings and a weakly defined tornus The hindwings are narrow-elongate and very long-fringed. The upper surfaces have neither a discal spot nor transverse lines. Each abdomen segment of the abdomen has paired patches of tiny spines which show through the scales. The resting position is horizontal with the front end raised and the cilia give the hind tip a frayed and upturned look if the wings are rolled around the body. C. serratella characteristics include head light ochreous - fuscous. Antennae whitish, ringed with fuscous, more faintly or obsoletely towards apex, basal joint fuscous. Forewings rather dark fuscous, ochreous - tinged. Hindwings dark fuscous. Only reliably identified by dissection and microscopic examination of the genitalia.

== Life cycle ==
The moth flies in June depending on the location.

The larvae feed on birches, elms, alders, hazels, apples, Crataegus, Sorbus, willows, Comptonia peregrina and Quercus wislizenii.
