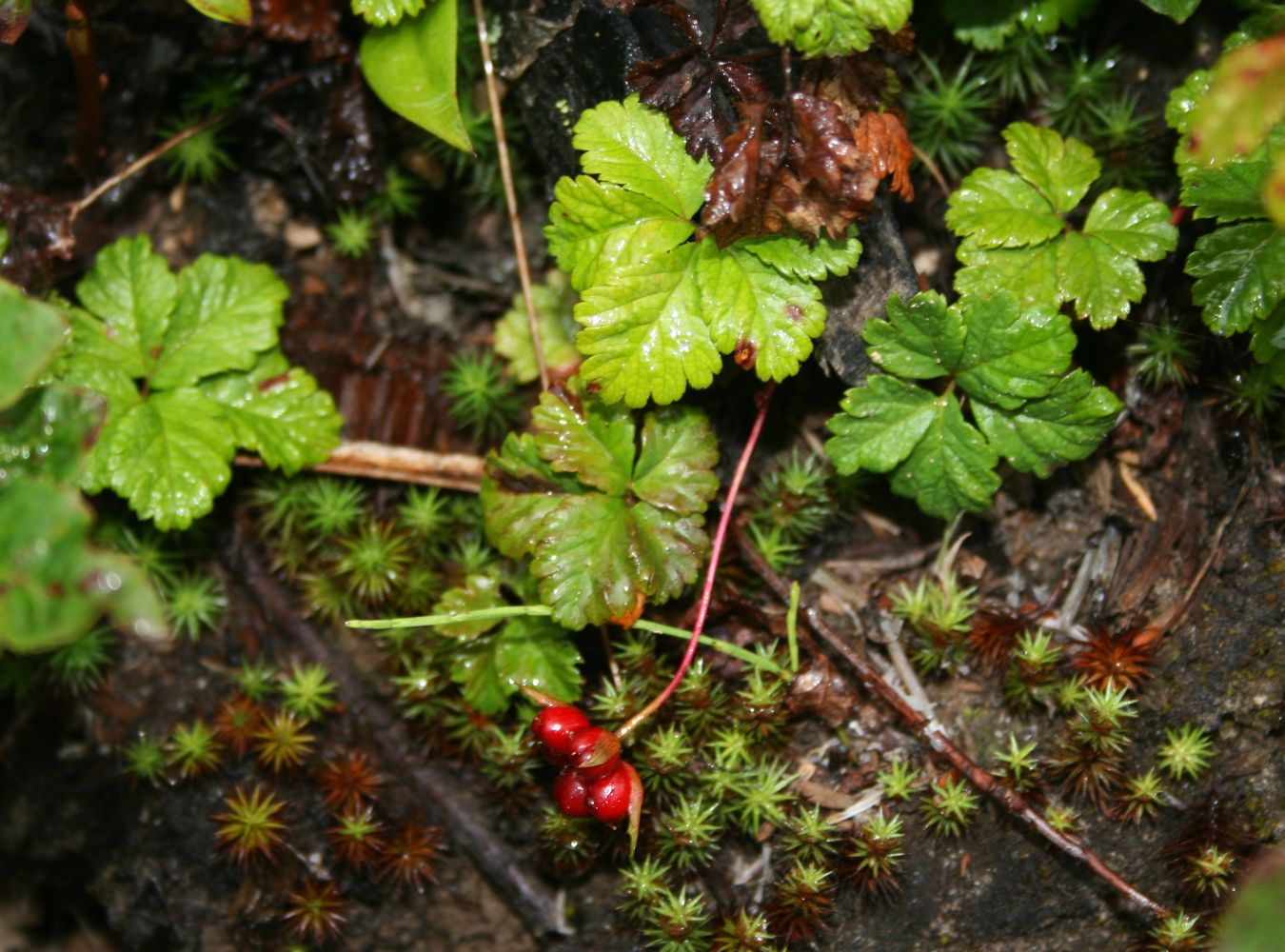

Scientific classification
- Kingdom: Plantae
- Clade: Tracheophytes
- Clade: Angiosperms
- Clade: Eudicots
- Clade: Rosids
- Order: Rosales
- Family: Rosaceae
- Genus: Rubus
- Species: R. pedatus

Binomial name
- Rubus pedatus Sm. 1791 not Banks & Sol. ex Lowe 1831

Synonyms
- Ametron pedatum (Sm.) Raf.; Comaropsis pedata (Sm.) DC.; Dalibarda pedata (Sm.) Stephan; Psychrobatia pedata (Sm.) Greene

= Rubus pedatus =

Berry and plant

Rubus pedatus is an Asian and North American species of raspberry known under the common names five-leaved bramble, strawberryleaf raspberry and creeping raspberry.

== Description ==
Rubus pedatus is a low shrub or herb with thorn-less creeping stems. The leaves are alternate, deciduous, and divided into 5 leaflets (hence the name), each coarsely toothed.

Occurring singly on slender stalks, the flowers are white and 1–2 centimetres (1/2–1 inch) across. The fruits are bright red, and consist of small clusters of drupelets, sometimes as few as one drupelet per fruit.

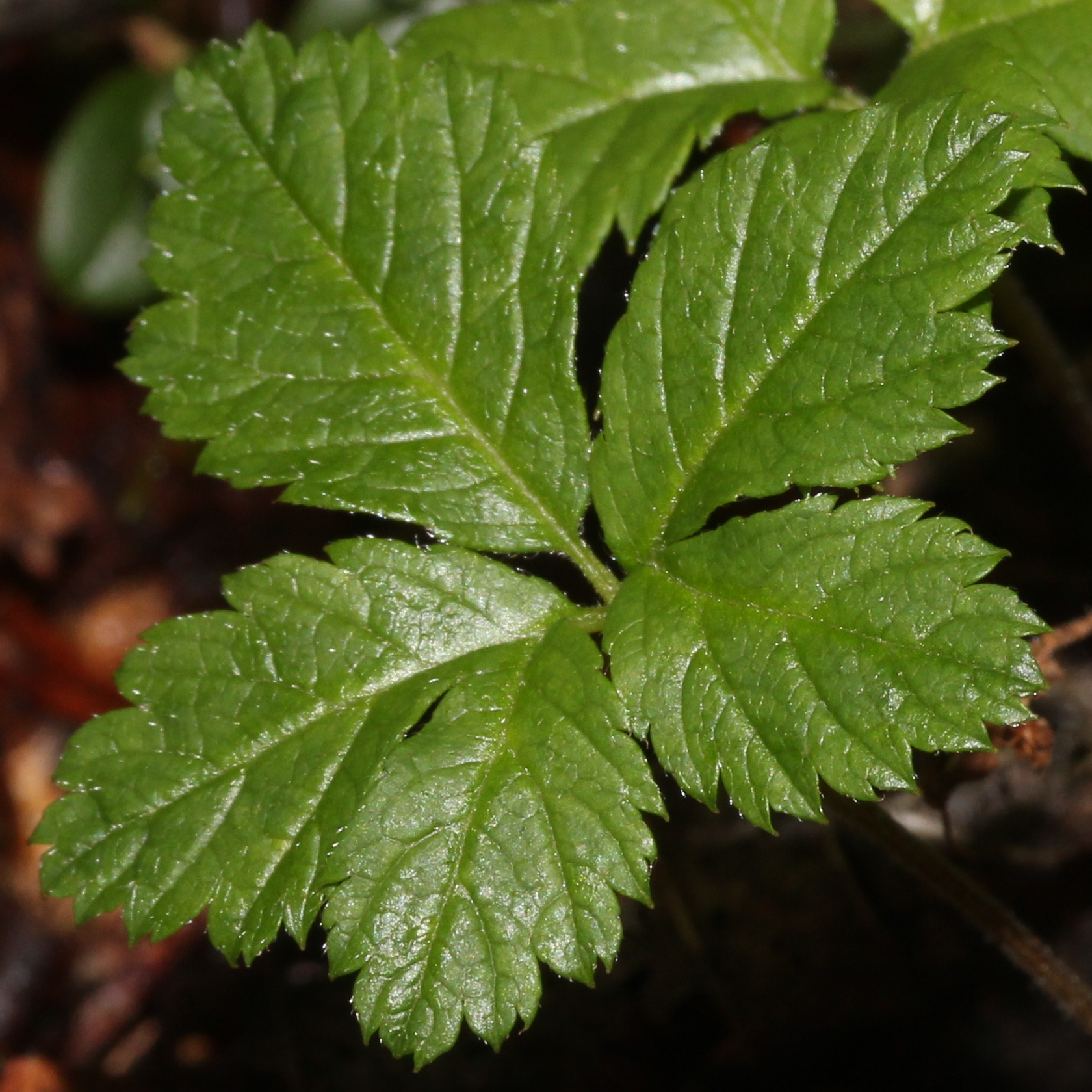
Leaf

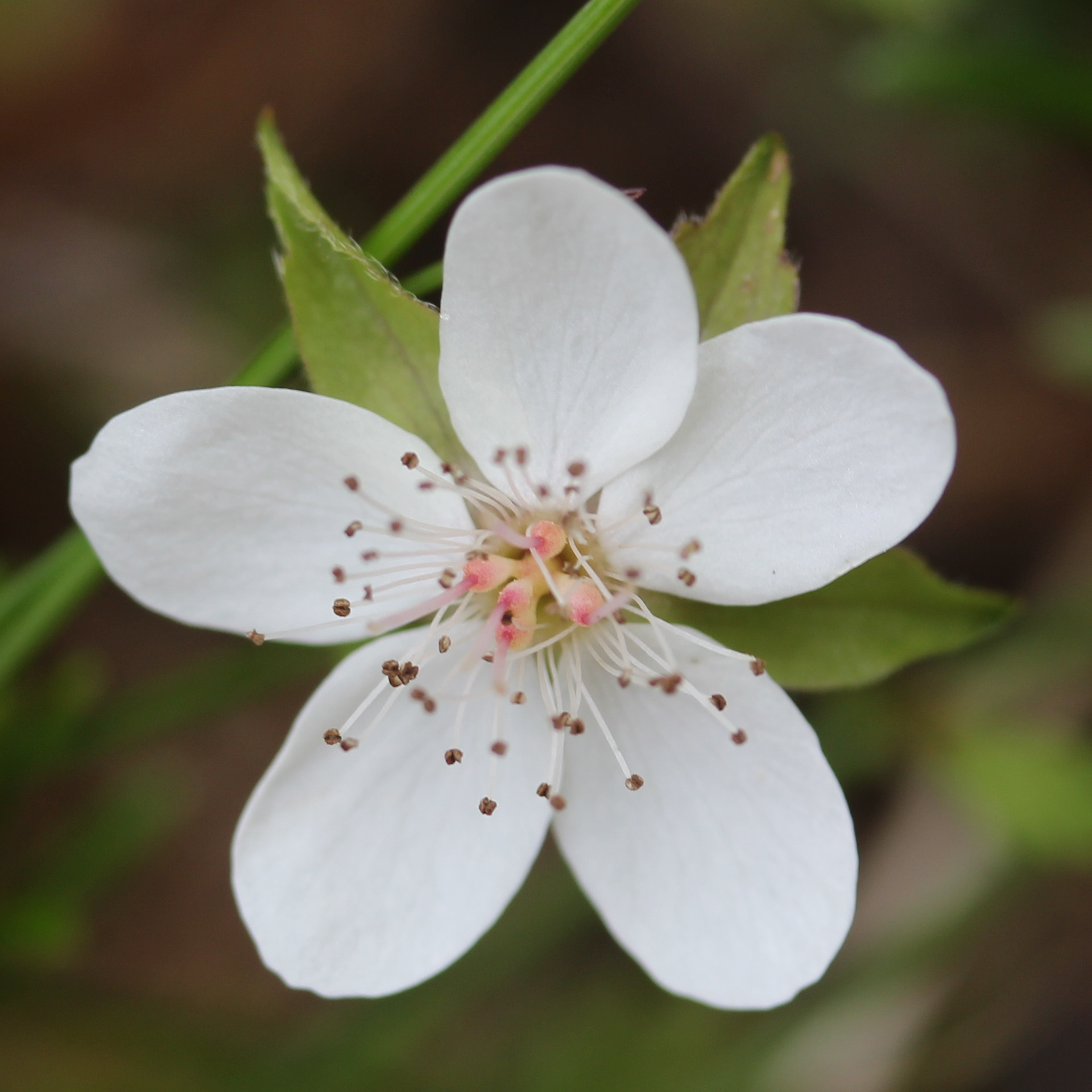
Flower

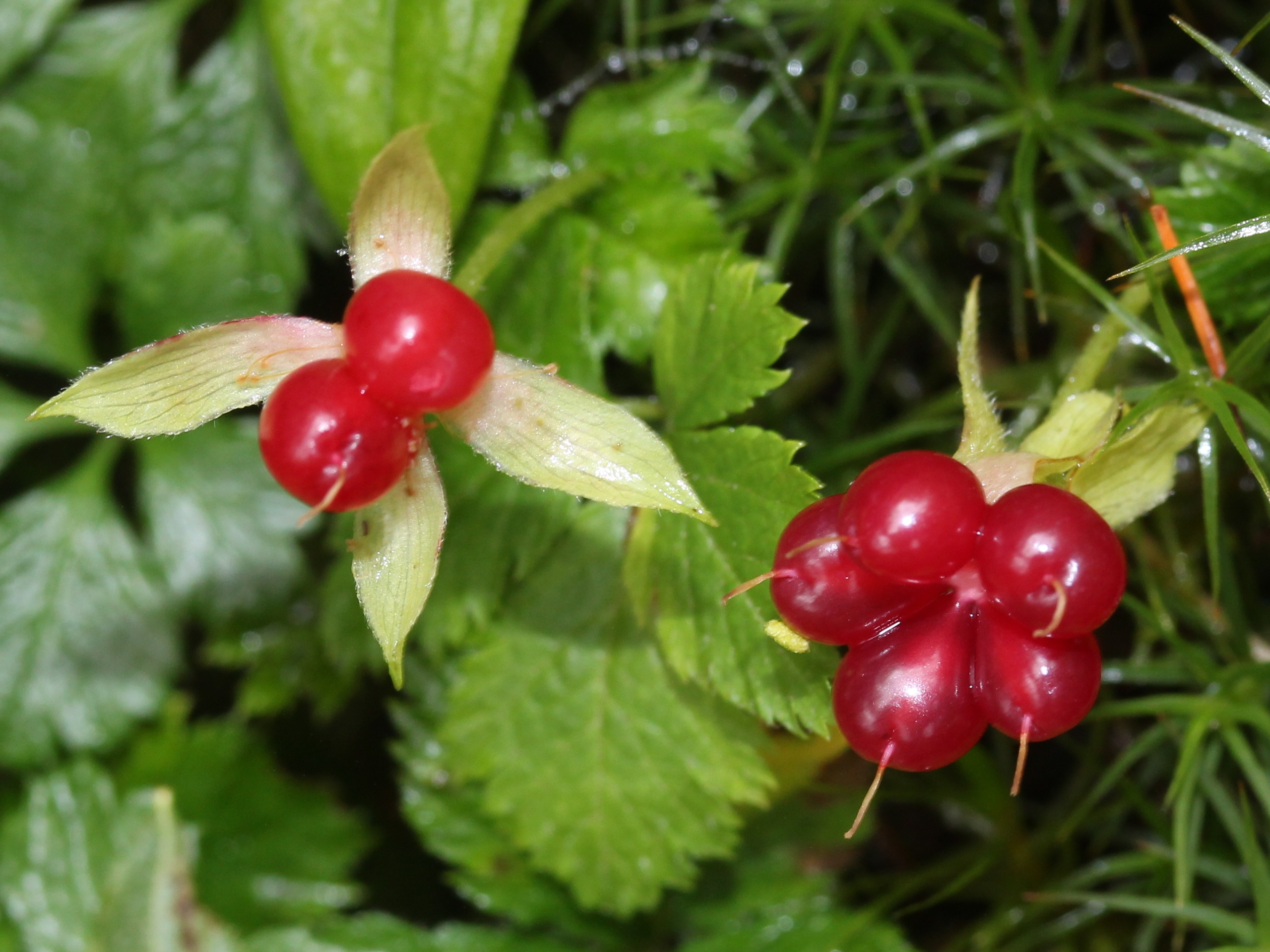
Fruits

== Distribution and habitat ==
Rubus pedatus is found in moist mossy forests, glades, stream banks and bog forests on the Pacific coasts of eastern Russia, Oregon, Washington, British Columbia and Alaska, inland to Yukon, Alberta, and Montana.

== Uses ==
The berries are edible.
