= Gaylussacia tomentosa =

Scientific classification
- Kingdom: Plantae
- Clade: Tracheophytes
- Clade: Angiosperms
- Clade: Eudicots
- Clade: Asterids
- Order: Ericales
- Family: Ericaceae
- Genus: Gaylussacia
- Species: G. tomentosa

Binomial name
- Gaylussacia tomentosa (A.Gray) Pursh ex Small 1897

Synonyms
- Gaylussacia frondosa var. tomentosa A.Gray 1878; Decachaena tomentosa (Pursh ex A.Gray) Small; Decamerium tomentosum (Pursh) Ashe; Vaccinium tomentosum Pursh ex A.Gray

Berry and plant

Gaylussacia tomentosa, commonly known as the hairy dangleberry or hairytwig huckleberry, is a plant species native to the coastal plains of the southeastern United States (Alabama, Georgia, Florida, the Carolinas).

Asa Gray described this species as Vaccinium tomentosum in 1878. It was given its current name in 1897.

Gaylussacia tomentosa is a shrub up to 200 cm (80 inches) tall, spreading by means of underground rhizomes hence sometimes forming huge colonies. Leaves are dull green or yellow-green on the upper surface, pale green and waxy on the underside. Flowers are in dangling groups of 2–4, greenish-white. Fruits are dark blue or occasionally white, sweet and juicy.

G. tomentosa has been found to inhabit habitat types such as sandhills, pine flatwoods, and xeric coastal fringe sandhills. It has shown preference for both dry and moist loamy sands.
