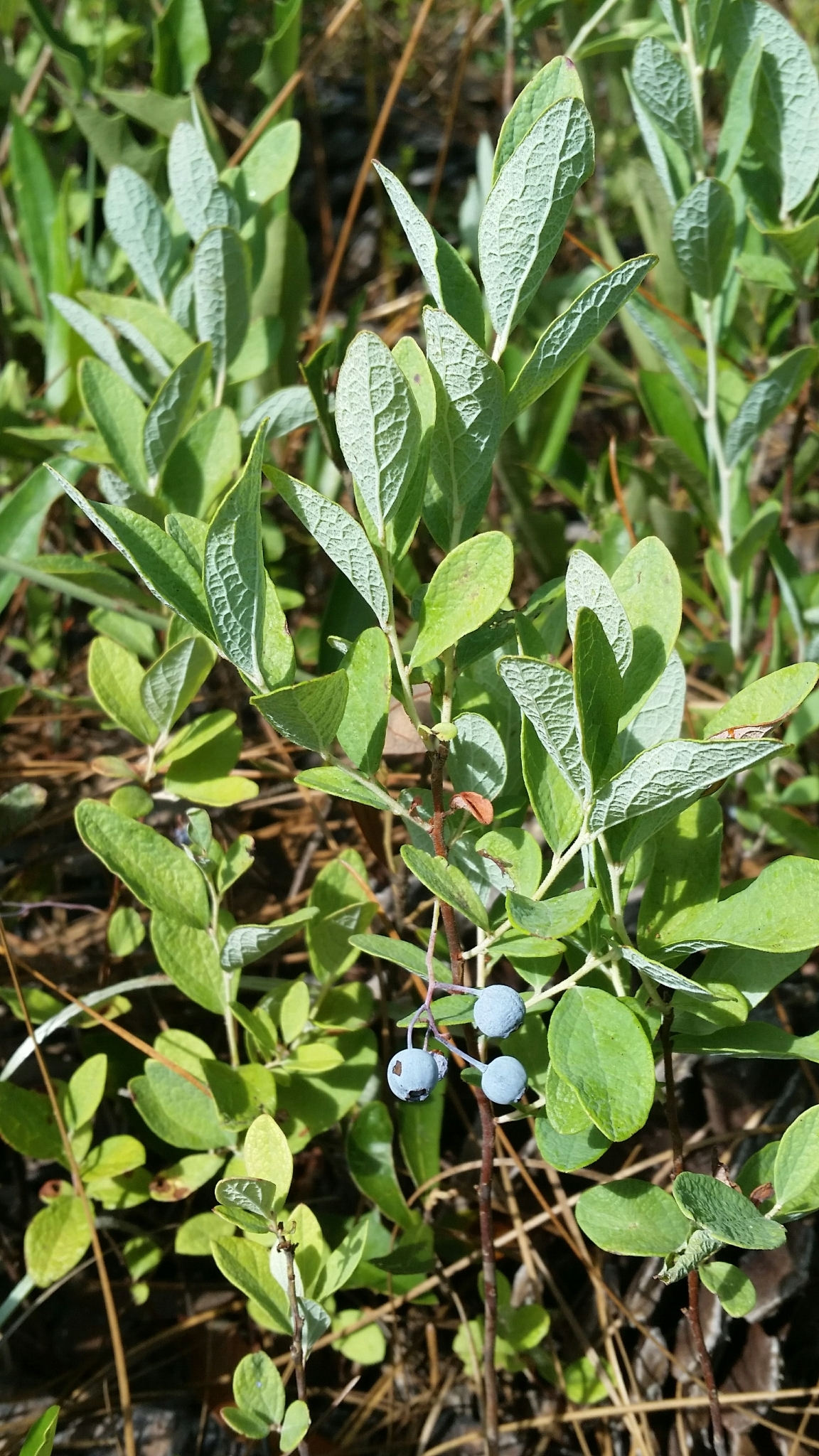

Scientific classification
- Kingdom: Plantae
- Clade: Tracheophytes
- Clade: Angiosperms
- Clade: Eudicots
- Clade: Asterids
- Order: Ericales
- Family: Ericaceae
- Genus: Gaylussacia
- Species: G. nana

Binomial name
- Gaylussacia nana (A. Gray) Small

Synonyms
- Decachaena nana (A. Gray) Small; Decamerium nanum (A. Gray) Ashe; Gaylussacia frondosa var. nana A. Gray 1886

= Gaylussacia nana =

Berry and plant

Gaylussacia nana, the dwarf dangleberry or Confederate huckleberry, is a plant species native to the coastal plains of the southeastern United States. It has been reported from Louisiana, Alabama, Mississippi, Georgia, Florida, North Carolina and South Carolina. It is found in either wet or dry soil, in woodlands, bogs, sandy ridges and savannahs, usually at elevations less than 100 m (330 feet).

Gaylussacia nana is a shrub up to 1 m (40 inches) tall, sometimes forming large colonies of hundreds of individuals. It has dull green to yellow-green leaves up to 4 cm (1.6 inches) long. Inflorescences hang from the leaf axils or from the tips of branches, with 1-4 greenish-white flowers. Fruits are sweet and juicy, usually dark blue but sometimes white, up to 8 mm (0.3 inches) in diameter.
