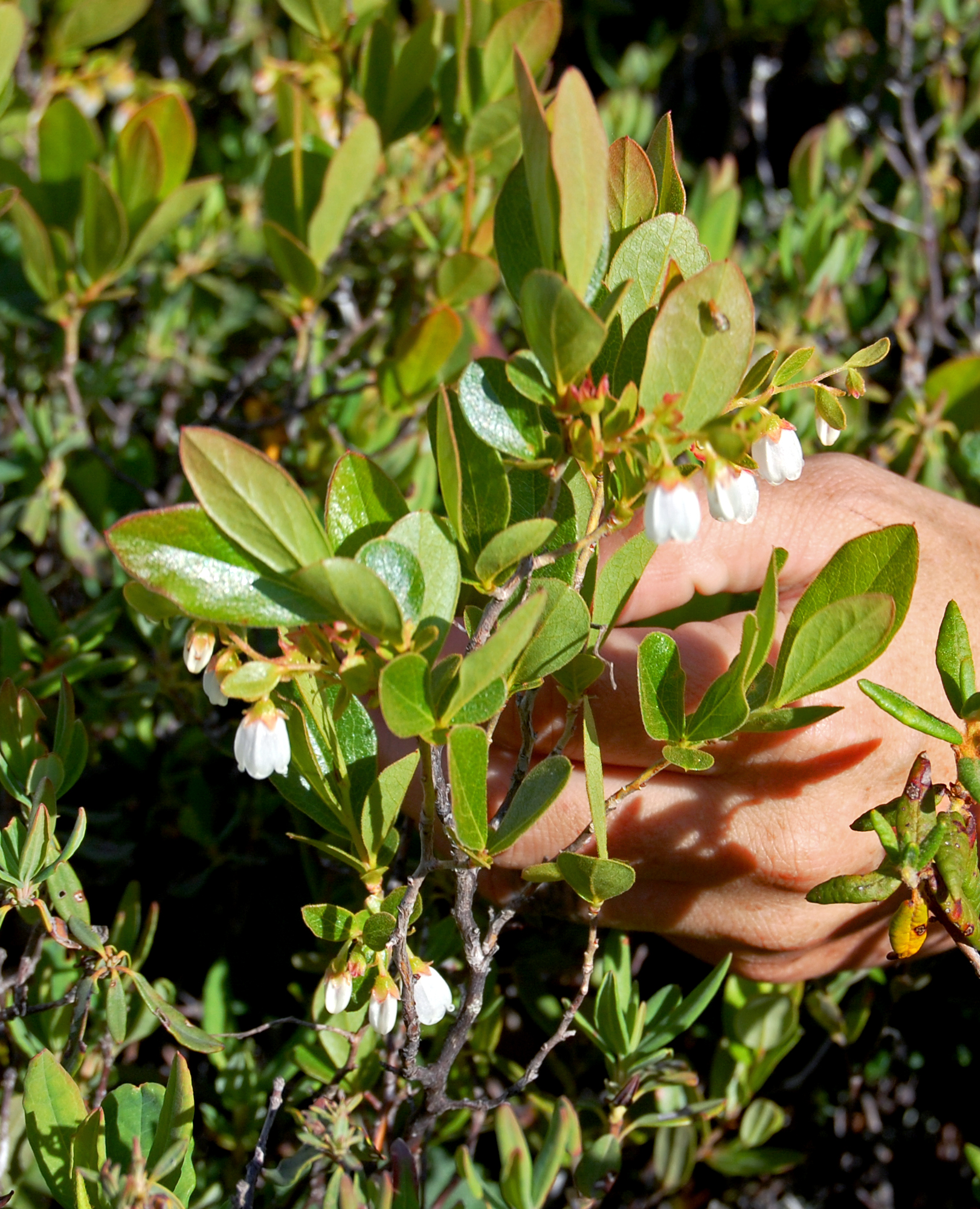

Conservation status
- Apparently Secure (NatureServe)

Scientific classification
- Kingdom: Plantae
- Clade: Tracheophytes
- Clade: Angiosperms
- Clade: Eudicots
- Clade: Asterids
- Order: Ericales
- Family: Ericaceae
- Genus: Gaylussacia
- Species: G. bigeloviana

Binomial name
- Gaylussacia bigeloviana (Fernald) Sorrie & Weakley 2007

Synonyms
- Gaylussacia dumosa var. bigeloviana Fernald 1911

= Gaylussacia bigeloviana =

Berry and plant

Gaylussacia bigeloviana, also known as the northern dwarf huckleberry or in French as the gaylussaquier de Bigelow, is a plant species native to the coastal plains of eastern Canada and the eastern United States. It grows from Newfoundland to South Carolina in swamps and marshes, including acidic bogs alongside Sphagnum peatmosses.

== Description ==
Gaylussacia bigeloviana is a shrub up to 1 m (40 inches) tall, sometimes forming small colonies. It has thick, leathery leaves, shiny on the top side, pale green on the underside. Flowers are in groups of 3–7, white, pink, or red. Fruits are black, juicy but bland-tasting.

== Conservation ==
According to NatureServe, the species' conservation status is currently G4G5 (rounded G4) however it has not been reviewed since 1994. More recently updated State/Provincial Statuses demonstrate wide variances with Nova Scotia (S5); New Brunswick, and Massachusetts (S4) reporting secure status while Newfoundland (S3S4); Prince Edward Island, Quebec, Connecticut, New Hampshire, North Carolina, Rhode Island (S2); New York (S1S2); South Carolina (S1) and Delaware (SH) all reporting at-risk status.
