= Bunchberry =

Bunchberry is a common name for several species of dwarf dogwoods:

- Cornus canadensis - Canadian or eastern bunchberry
- Cornus suecica - Eurasian or northern bunchberry
- Cornus × unalaschkensis - Alaskan or western bunchberry
