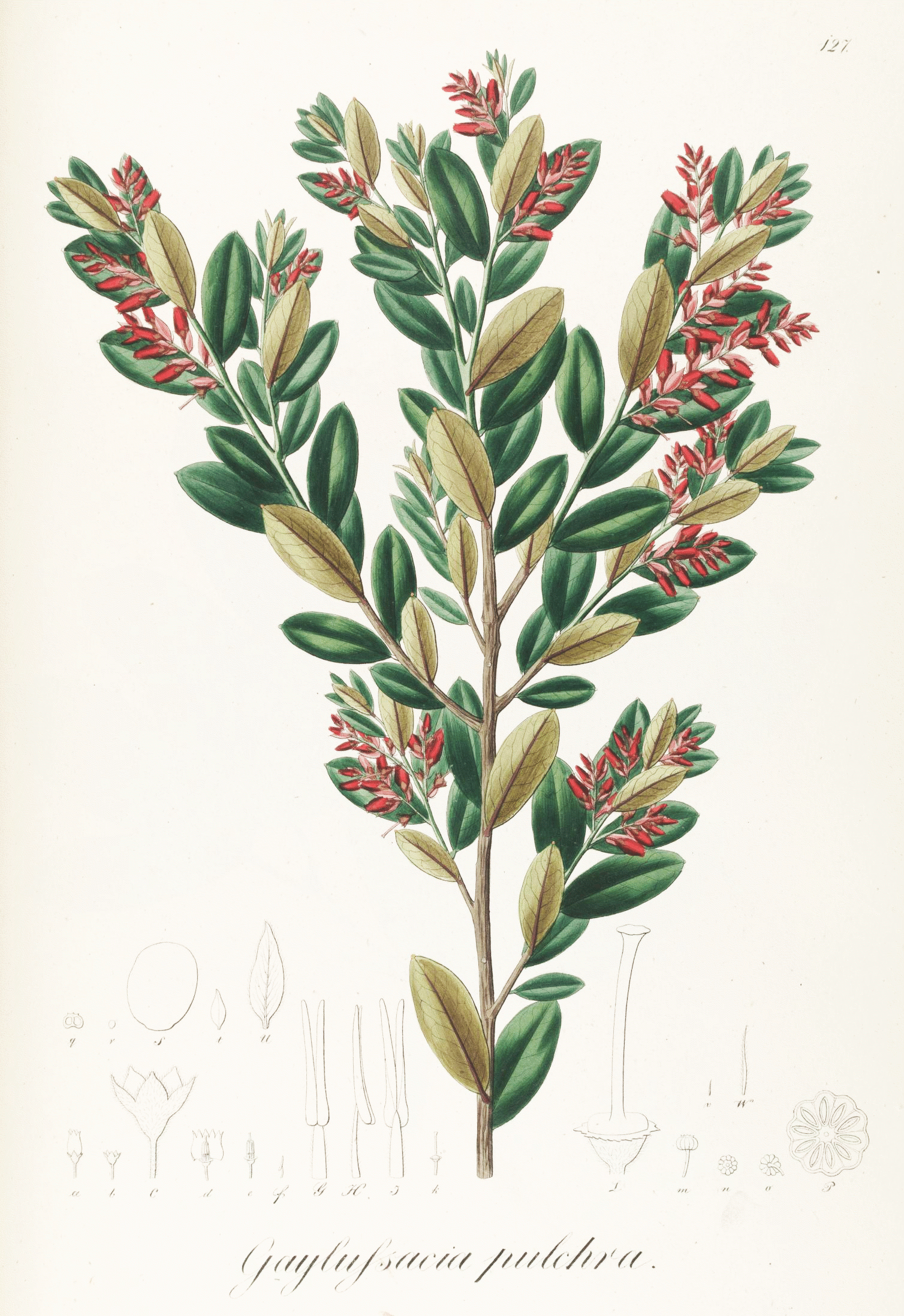
- Gaylussacia pulchra

Scientific classification
- Kingdom: Plantae
- Clade: Embryophytes
- Clade: Tracheophytes
- Clade: Angiosperms
- Clade: Eudicots
- Clade: Asterids
- Order: Ericales
- Family: Ericaceae
- Subfamily: Vaccinioideae
- Tribe: Vaccinieae
- Genus: Gaylussacia; Kunth

Type species
- Gaylussacia buxifolia Kunth

= Gaylussacia =

Genus of flowering plants

Gaylussacia is a genus of about fifty species of flowering plants in the family Ericaceae, native to the Americas, where they occur in eastern North America and in South America in the Andes and the mountains of southeastern Brazil (the majority of the known species). Common English names include huckleberry (shared with plants in several other genera) and "dangleberry".

Gaylussacia plants are often a component of an oak-heath forest. They are deciduous or evergreen shrubs growing to a height of 0.4–1.8 metres (1 ft 4 in – 5 ft 11 in).

== Ecology ==
Gaylussacia species are used as food plants by the larvae of some Lepidoptera (butterflies and moths) species including Coleophora gaylussaciella (which feeds exclusively on Gaylussacia) and Coleophora multicristatella.

== Classification ==
Gaylussacia is named in honor of the French chemist Joseph Louis Gay-Lussac (1778–1850). It is closely related to Vaccinium, and it is still unclear whether the commonly understood line between Vaccinium and Gaylussacia is justified. A 2002 paper found that molecular data did not support past divisions of Gaylussacia into sections.

== Fossil record ==
Pliocene seed and fruit fossils of †Gaylussacia rhenana are described from sand-filled river-channels in the brown coal pit of Fortuna-Garsdorf near Bergheim, North Rhine-Westphalia in Germany.

== Species ==
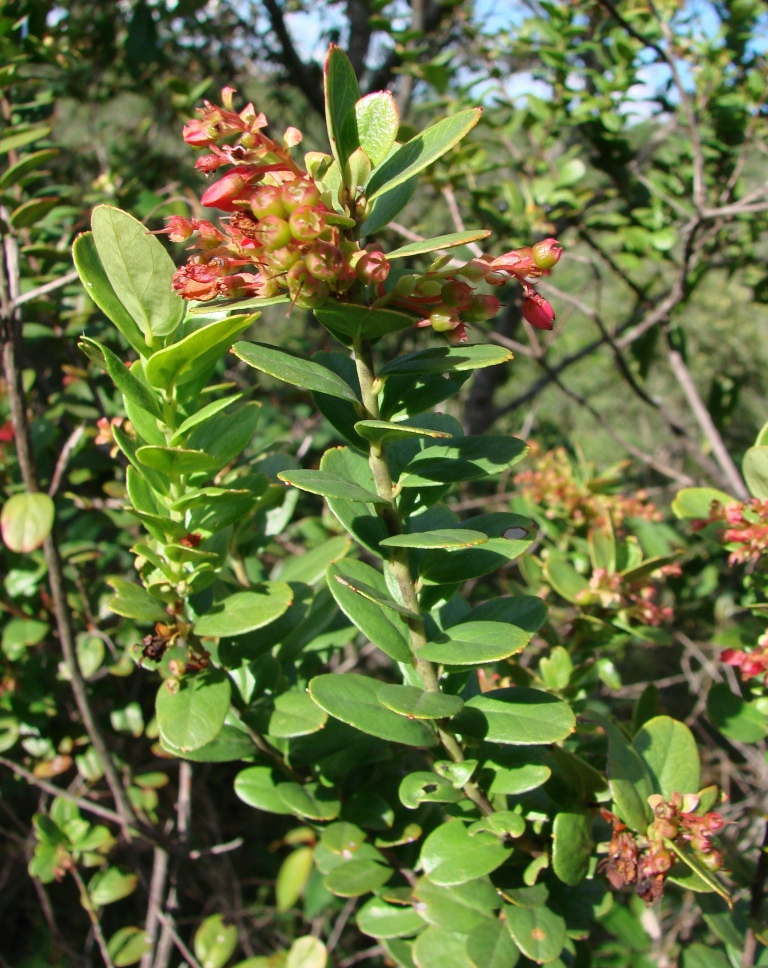
Gaylussacia brasiliensis

- Gaylussacia amazonica – Brazil
- Gaylussacia amoena – Rio de Janeiro
- Gaylussacia angulata – Brazil
- Gaylussacia angustifolia – Southern Brazil
- Gaylussacia baccata – Black huckleberry, Southeastern Canada, eastern United States
- Gaylussacia bigeloviana - East Coast of USA + Canada
- Gaylussacia brachycera – Box huckleberry, Eastern United States
- Gaylussacia brasiliensis – Southeastern Brazil, Paraguay
- Gaylussacia buxifolia – Uva de páramo, Colombia, Venezuela
- Gaylussacia caparoensis – Espírito Santo
- Gaylussacia caratuvensis - Paraná
- Gaylussacia cardenasii – Bolivia, Argentina
- Gaylussacia centunculifolia – Minas Gerais
- Gaylussacia chamissonis – Southeastern Brazil
- Gaylussacia ciliosa – Brazil
- Gaylussacia cinerea – Minas Gerais
- Gaylussacia corvensis - Santa Catarina
- Gaylussacia decipiens – Minas Gerais
- Gaylussacia densa – Minas Gerais, Bahia
- Gaylussacia duartei – Minas Gerais
- Gaylussacia dumosa – Dwarf huckleberry, Eastern USA + Canada
- Gaylussacia fasciculata – Brazil
- Gaylussacia frondosa – Blue huckleberry, Eastern United States
- Gaylussacia gardneri – Minas Gerais
- Gaylussacia goyazensis – Goiás
- Gaylussacia harleyi – Bahia
- Gaylussacia incana – Minas Gerais, Bahia
- Gaylussacia jordanensis – Brazil
- Gaylussacia loxensis – Ecuador, northern Peru
- Gaylussacia martii – Minas Gerais
- Gaylussacia montana – Minas Gerais
- Gaylussacia mosieri – Woolly huckleberry, Southeastern United States
- Gaylussacia nana – Dwarf dangleberry, Southeastern United States
- Gaylussacia oleifolia – Minas Gerais
- Gaylussacia orocola - North Carolina
- Gaylussacia pallida – Minas Gerais
- Gaylussacia peruviana - Peru, Ecuador
- Gaylussacia pinifolia – Minas Gerais
- Gaylussacia pruinosa – Brazil
- Gaylussacia pseudociliosa – Minas Gerais
- Gaylussacia pseudogaultheria – Bolivia, Brazil
- Gaylussacia pulchra – Minas Gerais, Bahia
- Gaylussacia reticulata – Brazil
- Gaylussacia retivenia – Rio de Janeiro
- Gaylussacia retusa – Minas Gerais
- Gaylussacia rhododendron – Paraná
- Gaylussacia riedelii – Minas Gerais
- Gaylussacia rigida – Brazil
- Gaylussacia rugosa – Minas Gerais
- Gaylussacia salicifolia – Brazil
- Gaylussacia setosa – Minas Gerais
- Gaylussacia tomentosa – Hairy-twig huckleberry, Southeastern United States
- Gaylussacia ursina – Bear huckleberry, Southeastern United States
- Gaylussacia virgata – Minas Gerais, Bahia
- Gaylussacia vitis-idaea – Minas Gerais
