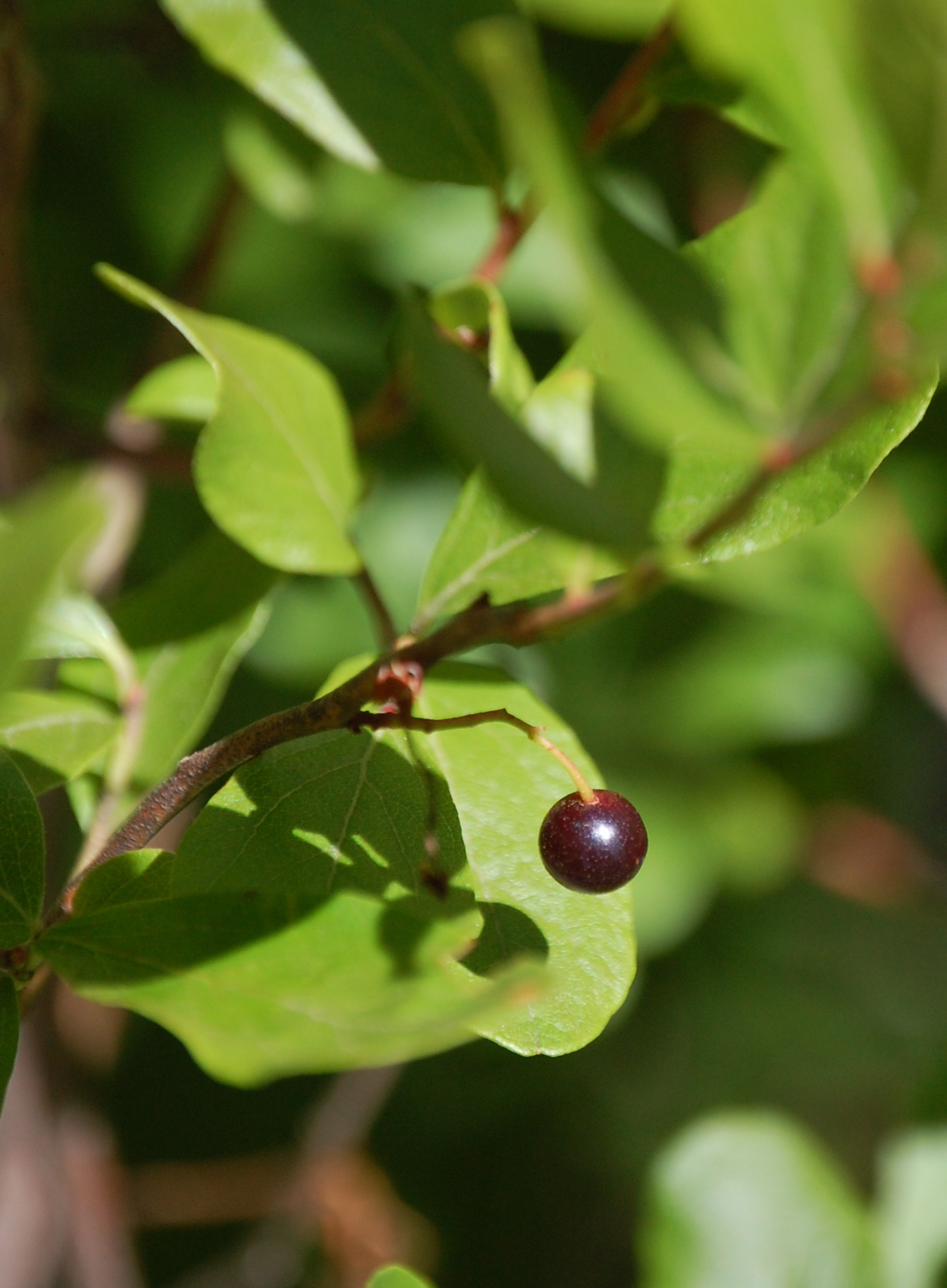

Scientific classification
- Kingdom: Plantae
- Clade: Tracheophytes
- Clade: Angiosperms
- Clade: Eudicots
- Clade: Asterids
- Order: Ericales
- Family: Ericaceae
- Genus: Gaylussacia
- Species: G. baccata

Binomial name
- Gaylussacia baccata (Wangenh.) K. Koch 1872

Synonyms
- List: Andromeda baccata Wangenh. 1787; Decachaena baccata (Wangenh.) Small; Adnaria resinosa (Torr. & A.Gray) Kuntze; Decamerium resinosum Nutt.; Gaylussacia resinosa (Aiton) Torr. & A.Gray; Vaccinium glabrum P.Watson; Vaccinium parviflorum Andrews; Vaccinium resinosum Aiton

= Gaylussacia baccata =

Black huckleberry

Berry and plant

Gaylussacia baccata, the black huckleberry, is a common huckleberry found throughout a wide area of eastern North America.

== Description ==
Gaylussacia baccata is a shrub up to 150 cm (5 feet) tall, forming extensive colonies. Flowers are in dangling groups of 3–7, orange or red, bell-shaped. The berries are dark blue, almost black, rarely white.

=== Similar species ===
The plant closely resembles the native blueberry plants (Vaccinium species) with which it grows in the same habitats, though it is distinct by the numerous resin dots on the undersides of the leaves which glitter in light.

== Distribution ==
The plant is native to Eastern Canada and the Great Lakes region, the Midwestern and Northeastern United States, and the Appalachian Mountains, the Ohio/Mississippi/Tennessee Valley, and Southeastern United States. The range extends from Newfoundland west to Manitoba and Minnesota, south as far as Arkansas, Alabama, and Georgia.

== Ecology ==
The shrub is considered fire-resistant due to surviving rhizomes quickly sending out new shoots following fires.

It is a larval host to the brown elfin, Gordian sphinx, Henry's elfin, and huckleberry sphinx.

== Uses ==
The berries are sweet, and are eaten raw, jellied, or baked into foods such as pancakes, muffins.

== See also ==
- Vaccinium membranaceum — with "black huckleberry" as common name also.
