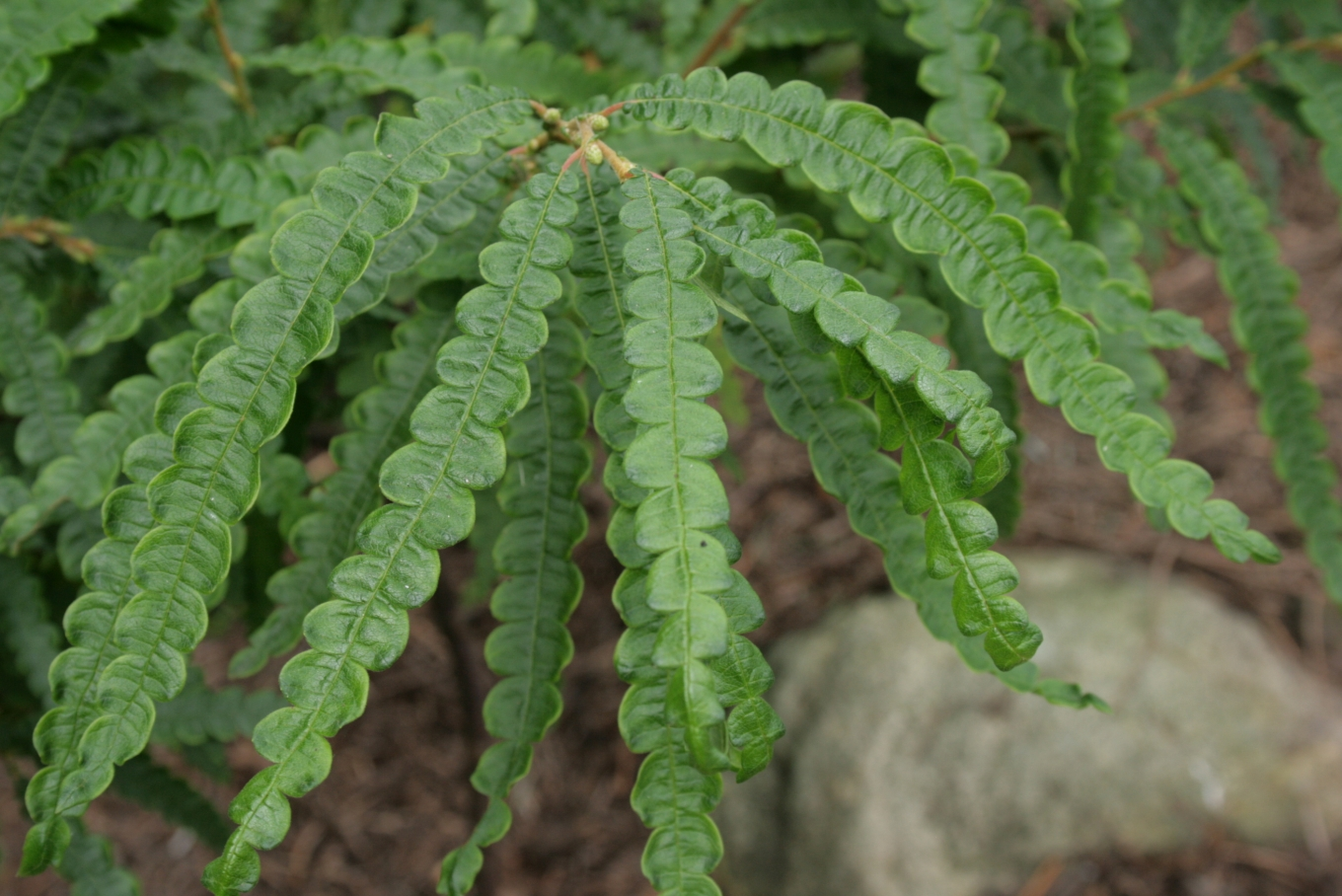
- Comptonia peregrina leaves

Scientific classification
- Kingdom: Plantae
- Clade: Tracheophytes
- Clade: Angiosperms
- Clade: Eudicots
- Clade: Rosids
- Order: Fagales
- Family: Myricaceae
- Genus: Comptonia; L'Hér.

Species
- Comptonia peregrina; †Comptonia anderssonii; †Comptonia columbiana; †Comptonia difformis; †Comptonia naumannii; †Comptonia tymensis

= Comptonia (plant) =

Genus of flowering plants

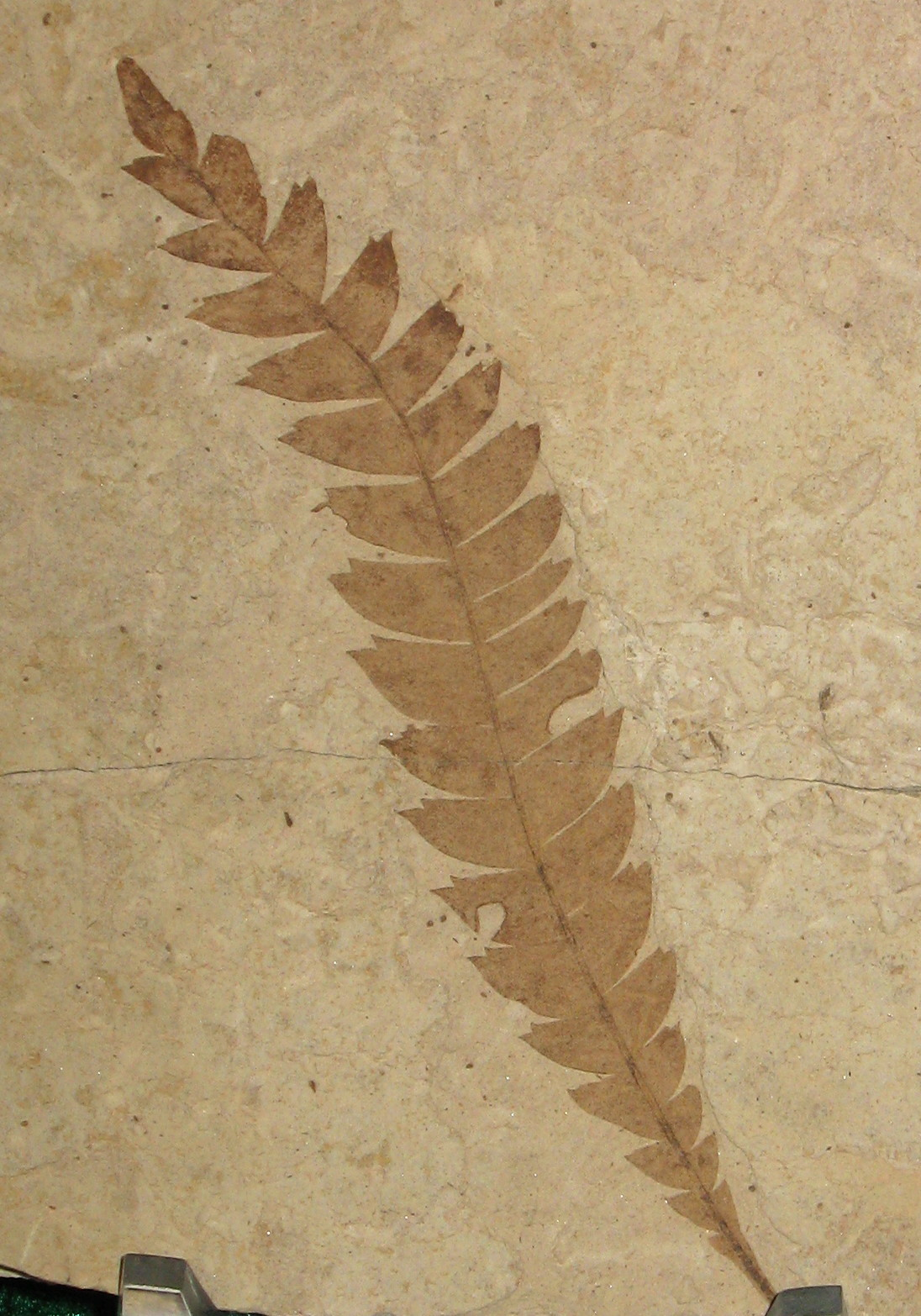
Comptonia columbiana, 49.5 mya, Klondike Mountain Formation

Comptonia is a genus of flowering plants in the family Myricaceae, native to parts of eastern North America. It has one extant (living) species, sweet fern, Comptonia peregrina, and a number of extinct species.

== Taxonomy ==
The living species was first described, as Liquidambar peregrina, by Carl Linnaeus in 1753, in the second volume of Species Plantarum. Further on in the same volume, he described Myrica aspleniifolia as a different species (with the epithet spelt asplenifolia). In 1763, he changed his mind concerning Myrica aspleniifolia, and it became Liquidambar aspleniifolia, and so in the same genus as Liquidambar peregrina.

In 1789, Charles Louis L'Héritier placed Linnaeus's original Myrica aspleniifolia in his new genus Comptonia. The genus is named in honor of Rev. Henry Compton (1632-1713), bishop of Oxford.

In 1894, John M. Coulter transferred Linnaeus's Liquidambar peregrina to Comptonia, and treated Linnaeus's Myrica aspleniifolia as a synonym. Comptonia peregrina is now the only extant (living) species in the genus.

Comptonia is categorized as an Actinorhizal plant - an angiosperm characterized by their ability to form a symbiosis with the nitrogen fixing actinomycetota Frankia. This association leads to the formation of nitrogen-fixing root nodules.
