= Coleophora isabellina =

Scientific classification
- Kingdom: Animalia
- Phylum: Arthropoda
- Class: Insecta
- Order: Lepidoptera
- Family: Coleophoridae
- Genus: Coleophora
- Species: C. isabellina

Binomial name
- Coleophora isabellina Falkovitsh, 1970

Species of moth

Coleophora isabellina is a moth of the family Coleophoridae. It is found in Uzbekistan.

Adults are whitish and do not have longitudinal grayish striae. They are on wing from August to the beginning of September.

The larvae feed on the fruit of Arbuscula richteri. They create a case similar to Coleophora tsherkesi.
