= Coleophora tsherkesi =

Scientific classification
- Kingdom: Animalia
- Phylum: Arthropoda
- Class: Insecta
- Order: Lepidoptera
- Family: Coleophoridae
- Genus: Coleophora
- Species: C. tsherkesi

Binomial name
- Coleophora tsherkesi Falkovitsh, 1970

Species of moth

Coleophora tsherkesi is a moth of the family Coleophoridae. It is found in Turkestan and Uzbekistan.

Adults have longitudinal grayish striae (stripes). They are on wing from the end of May to the beginning of June.

The larvae feed on the fruit of Arbuscula richteri. Larvae can be found from September to October. Fully fed larvae hibernate.
