= Coleophora subula =

Scientific classification
- Kingdom: Animalia
- Phylum: Arthropoda
- Class: Insecta
- Order: Lepidoptera
- Family: Coleophoridae
- Genus: Coleophora
- Species: C. subula

Binomial name
- Coleophora subula (Falkovitsh, 1993)

Synonyms
- Aureliania subula Falkovitsh, 1993

Species of moth

Coleophora subula is a moth of the family Coleophoridae. It is found in Hungary, Slovakia, Russia (central Siberia, Altai, Lower Wolga region), Tajikistan, Turkmenistan, Turkey and China (Xinjiang).
