= Coleophora tractella =

Scientific classification
- Kingdom: Animalia
- Phylum: Arthropoda
- Clade: Pancrustacea
- Class: Insecta
- Order: Lepidoptera
- Family: Coleophoridae
- Genus: Coleophora
- Species: C. tractella

Binomial name
- Coleophora tractella Zeller, 1849

Synonyms
- Coleophora brigensis Frey, 1880; Coleophora soraida Hering, 1942

Species of moth

Coleophora tractella is a moth of the family Coleophoridae. It is found in Switzerland.
