= Coleophora intensa =

Scientific classification
- Kingdom: Animalia
- Phylum: Arthropoda
- Class: Insecta
- Order: Lepidoptera
- Family: Coleophoridae
- Genus: Coleophora
- Species: C. intensa

Binomial name
- Coleophora intensa Meyrick, 1913

Species of moth

Coleophora intensa is a moth of the family Coleophoridae, and is found in South Africa. It has been generally accepted by the community, although it is obscure. It is also a part of multiple moth species discovered in the year 1913.
