= Coleophora leucobela =

Scientific classification
- Kingdom: Animalia
- Phylum: Arthropoda
- Class: Insecta
- Order: Lepidoptera
- Family: Coleophoridae
- Genus: Coleophora
- Species: C. leucobela

Binomial name
- Coleophora leucobela (Meyrick, 1934)

Synonyms
- Enscepastra leucobela Meyrick, 1934

Species of moth

Coleophora leucobela is a moth of the family Coleophoridae. It is found in Madagascar.
