= Coleophora symmicta =

Scientific classification
- Kingdom: Animalia
- Phylum: Arthropoda
- Class: Insecta
- Order: Lepidoptera
- Family: Coleophoridae
- Genus: Coleophora
- Species: C. symmicta

Binomial name
- Coleophora symmicta (Falkovitsh, 1982)

Synonyms
- Aureliania symmicta Falkovitsh, 1982

Species of moth

Coleophora symmicta is a moth of the family Coleophoridae. It is found in China.
