= Coleophora pontica =

Scientific classification
- Kingdom: Animalia
- Phylum: Arthropoda
- Class: Insecta
- Order: Lepidoptera
- Family: Coleophoridae
- Genus: Coleophora
- Species: C. pontica

Binomial name
- Coleophora pontica (Reznik, 1984)

Synonyms
- Multicoloria pontica Reznik, 1984

Species of moth

Coleophora pontica is a moth of the family Coleophoridae. It is found in Ukraine.
