= Coleophora orphnoceros =

Scientific classification
- Kingdom: Animalia
- Phylum: Arthropoda
- Class: Insecta
- Order: Lepidoptera
- Family: Coleophoridae
- Genus: Coleophora
- Species: C. orphnoceros

Binomial name
- Coleophora orphnoceros Meyrick, 1937

Species of moth

Coleophora orphnoceros is a moth of the family Coleophoridae. It is found in South Africa.
