= Coleophora aphanombra =

Scientific classification
- Kingdom: Animalia
- Phylum: Arthropoda
- Class: Insecta
- Order: Lepidoptera
- Family: Coleophoridae
- Genus: Coleophora
- Species: C. aphanombra

Binomial name
- Coleophora aphanombra Meyrick, 1913

Species of moth

Coleophora aphanombra is a moth of the family Coleophoridae. It is found in South Africa.
