= Coleophora megaloptila =

Scientific classification
- Kingdom: Animalia
- Phylum: Arthropoda
- Class: Insecta
- Order: Lepidoptera
- Family: Coleophoridae
- Genus: Coleophora
- Species: C. megaloptila

Binomial name
- Coleophora megaloptila Meyrick, 1909

Species of moth

Coleophora megaloptila is a moth of the family Coleophoridae, found in South Africa.
