= Coleophora eremodes =

Scientific classification
- Kingdom: Animalia
- Phylum: Arthropoda
- Class: Insecta
- Order: Lepidoptera
- Family: Coleophoridae
- Genus: Coleophora
- Species: C. eremodes

Binomial name
- Coleophora eremodes Meyrick, 1912

Species of moth

Coleophora eremodes is a moth of the family Coleophoridae. It is found in South Africa.
