= Coleophora halmodes =

Scientific classification
- Kingdom: Animalia
- Phylum: Arthropoda
- Class: Insecta
- Order: Lepidoptera
- Family: Coleophoridae
- Genus: Coleophora
- Species: C. halmodes

Binomial name
- Coleophora halmodes Meyrick, 1911

Species of moth

Coleophora halmodes is a moth of the family Coleophoridae. It is found in South Africa.
