= Coleophora illustrata =

Scientific classification
- Kingdom: Animalia
- Phylum: Arthropoda
- Class: Insecta
- Order: Lepidoptera
- Family: Coleophoridae
- Genus: Coleophora
- Species: C. illustrata

Binomial name
- Coleophora illustrata Meyrick, 1913

Species of moth

Coleophora illustrata is a moth of the family Coleophoridae. It is found in South Africa.
