= Coleophora efflua =

Scientific classification
- Kingdom: Animalia
- Phylum: Arthropoda
- Class: Insecta
- Order: Lepidoptera
- Family: Coleophoridae
- Genus: Coleophora
- Species: C. efflua

Binomial name
- Coleophora efflua Meyrick, 1911

Species of moth

Coleophora efflua is a moth of the family Coleophoridae. It is found in South Africa.
