= Coleophora triflua =

Scientific classification
- Kingdom: Animalia
- Phylum: Arthropoda
- Class: Insecta
- Order: Lepidoptera
- Family: Coleophoridae
- Genus: Coleophora
- Species: C. triflua

Binomial name
- Coleophora triflua Meyrick, 1911

Species of moth

Coleophora triflua is a moth of the family Coleophoridae. It is found in South Africa.
