= List of moths of North America (MONA 5510–6088) =

North American moths represent about 12,000 types of moths. In comparison, there are about 825 species of North American butterflies. The moths (mostly nocturnal) and butterflies (mostly diurnal) together make up the taxonomic order Lepidoptera.

This list is sorted on MONA number (MONA is short for Moths of America North of Mexico). A numbering system for North American moths introduced by Ronald W. Hodges, et al. in 1983 in the publication Check List of the Lepidoptera of America North of Mexico. The list has since been updated, but the placement in families is outdated for some species.

This list covers America north of Mexico (effectively the continental United States and Canada). For a list of moths and butterflies recorded from the state of Hawaii, see List of Lepidoptera of Hawaii.

This is a partial list, covering moths with MONA numbers ranging from 5510 to 6088. For the rest of the list, see List of moths of North America.

== Pyralidae ==
- no number yet – Paragalasa exospinalis
- 5510 – Pyralis farinalis, meal moth
- 5511 – Aglossa costiferalis
- 5512 – Aglossa disciferalis, pink-masked pyralid moth
- 5513 W – Aglossa electalis
- 5514 W – Aglossa cacamica
- 5515 – Pyralis manihotalis, tropical meal moth
- 5516 – Aglossa pinguinalis, large tabby moth
- 5517 – Aglossa caprealis, stored grain moth
- 5518 – Aglossa cuprina, grease moth
- 5519 – Aglossa acallalis
- 5520 – Aglossa baba
- 5521 – Aglossa gigantalis
- 5522 – Aglossa furva
- 5523 – Aglossa oculalis
- 5524 – Hypsopygia costalis, clover hayworm moth
- 5525 – Dolichomia planalis
- 5526 – Pseudasopia intermedialis, red-shawled moth
- 5527 – Pseudasopia phoezalis
- 5528 – Pseudasopia cohortalis
- 5529 – Dolichomia thymetusalis, spruce needleworm moth
- 5530 – Dolichomia binodulalis, pink-fringed dolichomia moth
- 5531 – Ocrasa nostralis, southern hayworm moth
- 5533 – Dolichomia olinalis, yellow-fringed dolichomia moth
- 5534 – Arispe cestalis
- 5535 – Arispe atalis
- 5536 – Neodavisia singularis
- 5536.1 – Neodavisia melusina
- 5537 – Caphys arizonensis
- 5538 – Parachma ochracealis
- 5540 – Basacallis tarachodes
- 5541 – Acallis gripalis
- 5542 – Acallis centralis
- 5543 – Acallis alticolalis
- 5544 W – Zaboba mitchelli
- 5545 – Zaboba unicoloralis
- 5546 – Anemosella nevalis
- 5547 W – Anemosella obliquata
- 5548 – Anemosella polingalis
- 5549 – Anemosella viridalis
- 5550 – Lepidomys irrenosa
- 5551 – Negalasa fumalis
- 5552 – Galasa nigrinodis, boxwood leaftier moth
- 5553 – Galasa nigripunctalis
- 5554 – Tetraschistis leucogramma, Amazon queen moth
- 5555 – Penthesilea sacculalis
- 5556 – Tosale oviplagalis, dimorphic tosale moth
- 5557 – Tosale similalis
- 5558 – Tosale aucta
- 5559 – Salobrena sincera
- 5560 – Salobrena rubiginea
- 5560.1 – Salobrena vacuana
- 5561 – Epitamyra birectalis
- 5562 W – Satole ligniperdalis
- 5563 – Clydonopteron sacculana, trumpet vine moth
- 5564 – Bonchis munitalis
- 5565 – Streptopalpia minusculalis
- 5566 – Arta statalis, posturing arta moth
- 5567 W – Arta epicoenalis
- 5568 – Arta olivalis, olive arta moth
- no number yet – Arta brevivalvalis
- 5571 – Condylolomia participalis, drab condylolomia moth
- 5572 – Blepharocerus rosellus
- 5573 – Blepharocerus ignitalis
- 5574 – Heliades mulleolella
- 5574.1 – Heliades huachucalis
- no number yet – Heliades lindae
- 5575 – Macalla thyrsisalis, mahogany webworm moth
- 5576 – Macalla phaeobasalis
- 5576.1 – Macalla glastionalis
- 5577 – Epipaschia superatalis, dimorphic macalla moth
- 5578 – Cacozelia pemphusalis
- 5579 – Macalla zelleri, Zeller's epipaschia moth
- 5580 W – Cacozelia basiochrealis, yellow-based cacozelia moth
- 5581 – Milgithea alboplagialis
- 5581.1 – Milgithea trilinearis
- 5582 – Deuterollyta majuscula
- 5584 – Toripalpus breviornatalis
- 5585 W – Toripalpus trabalis
- 5586 – Cacozelia interruptella
- 5587 – Cacozelia elegans
- 5588 – Oneida lunulalis, orange-tufted oneida moth
- 5588.1 W – Oneida grisiella
- 5589 W – Oneida luniferella
- 5590 – Tallula atramentalis
- 5591 – Tallula atrifascialis
- 5592 – Tallula watsoni, Watson's tallula moth
- 5593 – Tallula baboquivarialis
- 5594 – Tallula fieldi
- 5594.1 – Phidotricha erigens
- 5595 – Pococera robustella, pine webworm moth
- 5596 – Pococera scortealis, lespedeza webworm moth
- 5597 – Pococera melanogrammos, black-letter pococera moth
- 5598 – Pococera texanella
- 5599 – Pococera callipeplella
- 5600 – Pococera speciosella
- 5601 – Pococera floridella
- 5602 – Pococera subcanalis, cloaked pococera moth
- 5603 – Pococera maritimalis
- 5604 – Pococera militella, sycamore webworm moth
- 5605 – Pococera aplastella, aspen webworm moth
- 5606 – Pococera asperatella, maple webworm moth
- 5607 – Pococera vacciniivora
- 5608 – Pococera expandens, striped oak webworm moth
- 5609 – Pococera spaldingella
- 5610 – Pococera dolorosella
- 5611 – Pococera provoella
- 5612 – Pococera arizonella
- 5613 – Pococera thoracicella
- 5614 – Pococera griseella
- 5615 – Pococera fuscolotella
- 5616 – Pococera tiltella
- 5617 – Pococera humerella
- 5618 – Pococera gelidalis
- 5619 – Pococera baptisiella
- 5620 W – Pococera euphemella, mesquite leaf tier moth
- 5621 – Coenodomus hockingii
- 5621.1 – Cryptoblabes gnidiella
- 5621.2 – Stenopaschia trichopteris
- 5622 – Galleria mellonella, greater wax moth
- 5623 – Achroia grisella, lesser wax moth
- 5624 – Trachylepidia fructicassiella
- 5625 – Omphalocera cariosa
- 5626 W – Omphalocera occidentalis
- 5627 – Omphalocera munroei, asimina webworm moth
- 5628 – Thyridopyralis gallaerandialis
- 5629 – Aphomia sociella, the bee moth
- 5630 – Aphomia terrenella, terrenella bee moth
- 5631 – Aphomia fuscolimbella
- 5632 – Paralipsa gularis, stored nut moth
- 5633 – Paralipsa decorella
- 5633.1 – Paralipsa fulminalis
- 5633.2 – Epimorius testaceellus, bromeliad pod borer moth
- 5634 – Corcyra cephalonica, rice moth
- 5635 – Cacotherapia interalbicalis
- 5636 – Cacotherapia bilinealis
- 5637 – Cacotherapia angulalis
- 5638 – Cacotherapia unicoloralis
- 5639 – Cacotherapia unipuncta
- 5640 – Cacotherapia ponda
- 5641 – Cacotherapia nigrocinereella
- 5642 – Cacotherapia flexilinealis
- 5643 W – Cacotherapia leucocope
- 5644 – Cacotherapia lecerfialis
- 5645 – Alpheias vicarilis
- 5646 – Alpheias transferrens
- 5647 – Alpheias querula
- 5648 – Alpheias oculiferalis
- 5649 – Alpheioides parvulalis
- 5650 – Decaturia pectinalis
- 5651 – Acrobasis indigenella, leaf crumpler moth
- 5652 – Acrobasis grossbecki
- 5653 – Acrobasis vaccinii, cranberry fruitworm moth
- 5654 – Acrobasis amplexella
- 5655 – Acrobasis tricolorella, destructive pruneworm moth
- 5656 – Acrobasis comptella
- 5659 – Acrobasis palliolella, mantled acrobasis moth
- 5660 – Acrobasis caryalbella
- 5661 – Acrobasis juglandis, pecan leaf casebearer moth
- 5662 – Acrobasis sylviella, ironwood tubemaker moth
- 5662.1 – Acrobasis kylesi
- 5663 – Acrobasis kearfottella, Kearfott's acrobasis moth
- 5664 – Acrobasis caryae, hickory shoot borer moth
- 5665 – Acrobasis carpinivorella
- 5666 – Acrobasis elyi
- 5666.1 – Acrobasis texana
- 5667 – Acrobasis nuxvorella, pecan nut casebearer moth
- 5667.1 – Acrobasis juglanivorella
- 5668 – Acrobasis evanescentella
- 5668.1 – Acrobasis caulivorella
- 5669 – Acrobasis stigmella
- 5670 – Acrobasis aurorella
- 5672 – Acrobasis exsulella, cordovan pyralid moth
- 5673 – Acrobasis angusella, hickory leafstem borer moth
- 5674 – Acrobasis demotella, walnut shoot moth
- 5675 – Acrobasis latifasciella
- 5676 – Acrobasis irrubriella
- 5677 – Acrobasis normella
- 5680 – Acrobasis ostryella
- 5682 – Acrobasis coryliella
- 5684 – Acrobasis cirroferella
- 5685 – Acrobasis cunulae
- 5686 – Acrobasis caryivorella, hickory shoot moth
- 5688 – Acrobasis betulella, birch tubemaker moth
- 5689 – Acrobasis betulivorella
- 5690 – Acrobasis rubrifasciella, alder tubemaker moth
- 5691 – Acrobasis comptoniella, sweetfern leaf casebearer moth
- 5692 – Acrobasis myricella
- 5694 – Acrobasis blanchardorum
- 5695 W – Trachycera caliginella
- 5702 – Trachycera suavella
- 5703 – Trachycera pallicornella
- 5704 – Anabasis ochrodesma, cassia webworm moth
- 5705 – Hypsipyla grandella, mahogany shootborer moth
- 5705.1 – Anypsipyla univitella
- 5706 – Crocidomera imitata
- 5707 W – Cuniberta subtinctella
- 5708 – Adanarsa intransitella
- 5709 W – Bertelia grisella
- 5710 – Bertelia dupla
- 5711 – Hypargyria slossonella
- 5712 W – Chararica annuliferella
- 5713 – Chararica hystriculella
- 5714 – Chararica bicolorella
- 5715 – Myelois grossipunctella
- 5717 – Myelopsis immundella
- 5718 – Myelopsis subtetricella
- 5719 – Myelopsis minutularia
- 5720 – Myelopsis alatella
- 5720.1 – Myelopsoides venustus
- 5721 – Apomyelois bistriatella
- 5722 – Ectomyelois decolor, Caribbean dried fruit moth
- 5723 – Ectomyelois ceratoniae, locust bean moth
- 5724 – Amyelois transitella, navel orangeworm moth
- 5725 – Fundella pellucens, Caribbean podborer moth
- 5726 – Fundella argentina
- 5726.1 – Fundella ignobilis
- 5727 W – Promylea lunigerella
- 5728 – Anadelosemia texanella
- 5729 – Anadelosemia condigna
- 5730 W – Dasypyga alternosquamella
- 5731 W – Dasypyga salmocolor
- 5732 – Davara caricae, papaya webworm moth
- 5733 – Sarasota plumigerella
- 5734 – Atheloca subrufella, palm bud moth
- 5735 – Triozosneura dorsonotata
- 5736 – Monoptilota pergratialis, lima-bean vine borer moth
- 5737 – Zamagiria australella
- 5738 – Philocrotona kendalli
- 5739 – Zamagiria laidion
- 5740 – Anegcephalesis arctella
- 5741 – Ancylostomia stercorea
- 5742 – Caristanius decoloralis, caristanius moth
- 5743 – Caristanius minimus
- 5744 – Etiella zinckenella, gold-banded etiella moth
- 5745 – Glyptocera consobrinella
- 5746 – Pima boisduvaliella
- 5747 – Pima albiplagiatella, white-edged pima moth
- 5747.1 W – Pima occidentalis
- 5748 W – Pima fosterella
- 5750 – Pima albocostalialis
- 5751 – Pima fulvirugella
- 5752 W – Pima granitella
- 5753 – Pima parkerella
- 5753.1 – Pima fergusoni
- 5754 – Pimodes insularis
- 5754.1 – Pimodes caliginosus
- 5755 – Interjectio denticulella
- 5756 W – Interjectio columbiella
- 5758 – Interjectio niviella
- 5759 – Ambesa laetella
- 5760 W – Ambesa walsinghami
- 5760.1 – Ambesa mirabella
- 5761 – Ambesa lallatalis
- 5761.1 – Ambesa dentifera
- 5762 – Catastia bistriatella
- 5763 – Catastia incorruscella
- 5764 – Catastia actualis
- 5764.1 – Catastia subactualis
- 5765 – Glyphocystis viridivallis
- 5766 – Immyrla nigrovittella
- 5767 – Oreana unicolorella
- 5768 – Olybria aliculella
- 5769 – Olybria furciferella
- 5770 – Salebriacus odiosellus
- 5770.1 – Salebriaria ademptandella
- 5771 – Salebriaria turpidella
- 5772 – Salebriaria nubiferella
- 5772.1 – Salebriaria borealis
- 5772.2 – Salebriaria chisosensis
- 5773 – Salebriaria engeli, Engel's salebriaria moth
- 5773.1 – Salebriaria roseopunctella
- 5773.2 – Salebriaria rufimaculatella
- 5774 – Salebriaria annulosella
- 5774.1 – Salebriaria robustella
- 5774.2 – Salebriaria bella
- 5774.3 – Salebriaria fergusonella
- 5774.4 – Salebriaria grandidentalis
- 5775 – Salebriaria tenebrosella
- 5775.1 – Salebriaria fasciata
- 5775.2 – Salebriaria rufimaculatella
- 5775.3 – Salebriaria squamopalpiella
- 5775.4 – Salebriaria equivoca
- 5775.5 – Salebriaria integra
- 5775.6 – Salebriaria maximella
- 5775.7 – Salebriaria simpliciella
- 5775.8 – Salebriaria carolynae
- 5775.9 – Salebriaria kanawha
- 5776 – Salebriaria pumilella
- 5776.1 – Salebriaria floridana
- 5776.2 – Salebriaria pallidella
- 5777 – Quasisalebria fructetella
- 5777.1 – Quasisalebria occidentalis
- 5778 – Pempelia nigricans
- 5779 W – Quasisalebria admixta
- 5779.1 – Quasisalebria atratella
- 5780 – Ortholepis jugosella
- 5781 – Ortholepis myricella
- 5781.1 – Ortholepis baloghi
- 5782 – Ortholepis rhodorella
- 5783 – Ortholepis pasadamia, striped birch pyralid moth
- 5784 W – Polopeustis arctiella
- 5785 W – Meroptera mirandella
- 5785.1 W – Meroptera anaimella
- 5785.2 – Meroptera nevadensis
- 5786 – Meroptera cviatella, poplar bud borer moth
- 5787 – Meroptera pravella, lesser aspen webworm moth
- 5788 – Meroptera abditiva
- 5789 – Sciota subfuscella, striped sumac leafroller moth
- 5790 – Sciota delassalis
- 5790.1 – Sciota fraudifera
- 5791 – Sciota rubescentella
- 5792 – Sciota fernaldi
- 5793 W – Sciota dammersi
- 5793.1 – Sciota floridenesis, Florida sciota moth
- 5794 – Sciota vetustella
- 5795 – Sciota inconditella
- 5796 – Sciota subcaesiella, locust leafroller moth
- 5797 – Sciota virgatella, black-spotted leafroller moth
- 5798 – Sciota carneella, willow gall inquiline moth
- 5799 – Sciota basilaris
- 5800 W – Sciota termitalis
- 5800.1 – Sciota levigatella
- 5800.2 – Sciota californiana
- 5800.3 – Sciota yuconella
- 5801 W – Sciota bifasciella
- 5802 – Sciota uvinella, sweetgum leafroller moth
- 5803 – Sciota celtidella
- 5804 – Sciota rubrisparsella
- 5805 W – Sciota gilvibasella
- 5805.1 – Sciota quasisubfuscella
- 5806 – Sciota crassifasciella
- 5808 – Tlascala reductella, tlascala moth
- 5809 – Tulsa finitella
- 5810 – Tulsa umbripennis
- 5811 – Tulsa oregonella
- 5812 – Telethusia ovalis
- 5814 – Phobus brucei
- 5815 – Phobus funerellus
- 5816 – Phobus curvatellus
- 5817 – Phobus incertus
- 5818 – Actrix nyssaecolella, tupelo leaffolder moth
- 5819 – Actrix dissimulatrix
- 5820 – Stylopalpia scobiella
- 5820.1 – Stylopalpia lunigerella
- 5821 – Hypochalcia hulstiella
- 5822 W – Pyla fasciolalis
- 5823 W – Pyla impostor
- 5824 – Pyla aequivoca
- 5824.1 – Pyla arenaeola
- 5826 – Pyla insinuatrix
- 5827 – Pyla aenigmatica
- 5828 – Pyla criddlella
- 5829 – Pyla fusca, speckled black pyla moth
- 5830 – Pyla hypochalciella
- 5831 – Pyla hanhamella
- 5831.1 – Pyla westerlandi
- 5832 – Pyla scintillans
- 5832.1 – Pyla longispina
- 5832.2 – Pyla serrata
- 5833 – Pyla rainierella
- 5834 – Pyla aeneella
- 5835 W – Pyla aeneoviridella
- 5836 – Pyla metalicella
- 5837 – Pyla fasciella
- 5838 – Pyla nigricula
- 5839 – Pyla viridisuffusella
- 5840 – Phycitopsis flavicornella
- 5841 – Dioryctria abietivorella, evergreen coneworm moth
- 5842 – Dioryctria taedae
- 5843 – Dioryctria reniculelloides, spruce coneworm moth
- 5844 W – Dioryctria pseudotsugella
- 5845 W – Dioryctria rossi
- 5846 W – Dioryctria auranticella, ponderosa pineconeworm moth
- 5847 – Dioryctria disclusa, webbing coneworm moth
- 5848 – Dioryctria erythropasa
- 5849 – Dioryctria pygmaeella, bald cypress coneworm moth
- 5849.1 W – Dioryctria caesirufella
- 5850 W – Dioryctria ponderosae
- 5851 – Dioryctria okanaganella
- 5851.1 – Dioryctria hodgesi
- 5852 – Dioryctria zimmermani, Zimmerman pine moth
- 5852.1 – Dioryctria delectella
- 5853 – Dioryctria amatella, southern pineconeworm moth
- 5854 W – Dioryctria cambiicola, western pine moth
- 5854.1 – Dioryctria merkeli, loblolly pineconeworm moth
- 5855 – Dioryctria tumicolella
- 5856 – Dioryctria contortella
- 5857 – Dioryctria monticolella
- 5858 – Dioryctria banksiella
- 5859 – Dioryctria albovittella
- 5859.1 W – Dioryctria westerlandi
- 5859.2 – Dioryctria fordi
- 5859.3 – Dioryctria mutuurai
- 5860 – Dioryctria baumhoferi
- 5861 W – Dioryctria pentictonella
- 5861.1 – Dioryctria resinosella, red pine shoot moth
- 5861.2 – Dioryctria muricativorella
- 5861.3 – Dioryctria vancouverella
- 5861.4 – Dioryctria durangoensis
- 5862 W – Dioryctria gulosella
- 5863 W – Dioryctria subtracta
- 5863.1 – Dioryctria clarioralis, blister coneworm moth
- 5863.2 – Dioryctria inyoensis
- 5863.3 – Dioryctria sierra
- 5863.4 – Dioryctria ebeli, south coastal coneworm moth
- 5863.5 – Dioryctria taedivorella, lesser loblolly pineconeworm moth
- 5863.6 – Dioryctria yatesi, mountain pineconeworm moth
- 5864 – Oryctometopia fossulatella
- 5865 – Sarata edwardsialis
- 5866 – Sarata pullatella
- 5867 – Sarata punctella
- 5868 W – Sarata incanella
- 5869 – Sarata atrella
- 5870 – Sarata caudellella
- 5871 – Sarata dnopherella
- 5872 – Sarata nigrifasciella
- 5873 – Sarata cinereella
- 5874 – Sarata rubrithoracella
- 5875 – Sarata tephrella
- 5885 – Philodema rhoiella
- 5886 – Lipographis fenestrella
- 5888 – Lipographis truncatella
- 5889 – Lipographis umbrella
- 5889.1 – Quasisarata subosseella
- 5890 – Adelphia petrella
- 5891 – Pseudadelphia ochripunctella
- 5892 W – Ufa lithosella
- 5894 W – Ufa senta
- 5895 – Ufa rubedinella
- 5896 – Elasmopalpus lignosellus, lesser cornstalk borer moth
- 5897 – Acroncosa albiflavella
- 5897.1 – Acroncosa minima
- 5897.2 – Acroncosa castrella
- 5898 – Acroncosa similella
- 5899 W – Passadena flavidorsella
- 5899.1 W – Passadenoides montanus
- 5899.2 – Passadenoides donahuei
- 5899.3 – Passadenoides pullus
- 5899.4 – Chorrera extrincica
- 5900 – Ulophora groteii
- 5901 W – Tacoma feriella
- 5902 – Ragonotia dotalis
- 5903 – Martia arizonella
- 5904 W – Eumysia mysiella
- 5905 – Eumysia maidella
- 5906 – Eumysia fuscatella
- 5907 – Eumysia semicana
- 5908 – Eumysia idahoensis
- 5908.1 – Eumysia pallidipennella
- 5909 – Macrorrhinia ochrella
- 5911 – Macrorrhinia parvulella
- 5912 W – Macrorrhinia aureofasciella
- 5913 – Macrorrhinia endonephele
- 5914 – Macrorrhinia dryadella
- 5914.5 – Arcola malloi, alligatorweed stem borer moth
- 5915 – Maricopa lativittella
- 5916 W – Heterographis morrisonella
- 5917 – Staudingeria albipenella
- 5918 – Hulstia undulatella, sugarbeet crown borer moth
- 5919 – Honora mellinella
- 5920 – Honora subsciurella
- 5921 – Honora sciurella
- 5922 – Honora dotella
- 5923 W – Honora montinatatella
- 5924 – Honora perdubiella
- 5925 – Honora dulciella
- 5926 – Canarsia ulmiarrosorella, elm leaftier moth
- 5927 – Eurythmidia ignidorsella
- 5928 – Wunderia neaeriatella
- 5929 – Diviana eudoreella
- 5930 – Palatka nymphaeella
- 5930.1 – Palatka powelli
- 5931 – Psorosina hammondi
- 5932 – Patriciola semicana
- 5933 – Anderida sonorella
- 5933.1 – Anderida peorinella
- 5933.2 – Cassiana malacella
- 5934 – Mescinia estrella
- 5934.1 – Mescinia berosa
- 5934.2 – Mescinia parvula
- 5934.3 W – Mescinia texanica
- 5935 – Homoeosoma electella, sunflower moth
- 5935.1 – Homoeosoma nanophasma
- 5935.2 – Homoeosoma phaeoboreas
- 5936 – Homoeosoma stypticella
- 5937 W – Homoeosoma striatellum
- 5937.1 – Homoeosoma asylonnastes
- 5938 – Homoeosoma oslarellum
- 5938.1 – Homoeosoma parvalbum
- 5938.2 – Homoeosoma oxycercus
- 5939 – Homoeosoma illuviella
- 5939.1 – Homoeosoma emandator
- 5941 – Homoeosoma albescentella
- 5942 W – Homoeosoma impressalis
- 5943 – Homoeosoma inornatella
- 5943.1 – Homoeosoma uncanale
- 5944 – Homoeosoma deceptorium
- 5944.1 W – Homoeosoma eremophasma
- 5944.2 – Homoeosoma ammonastes
- 5944.3 – Homoeosoma pedionnastes
- 5944.4 – Homoeosoma ardaloniphas
- 5945 – Patagonia peregrinum
- 5946 W – Phycitodes albatella
- 5946.1 W – Phycitodes mucidella
- 5946.2 – Phycitodes reliquella
- 5947 – Unadilla maturella
- 5948 – Unadilla erronella
- 5949 – Laetilia coccidivora, scale-feeding snout moth
- 5949.1 W – Laetilia dilatifasciella
- 5949.2 – Laetilia hulstii
- 5950 W – Laetilia zamacrella
- 5951 – Laetilia myersella
- 5952 W – Laetilia ephestiella
- 5953 – Laetilia fiskella
- 5953.1 – Laetilia cinerosella
- 5953.2 – Laetilia bellivorella
- 5954 – Rostrolaetilia placidella
- 5955 – Rostrolaetilia minimella
- 5956 – Rostrolaetilia placidissima
- 5957 – Rostrolaetilia utahensis
- 5958 – Rostrolaetilia coloradella
- 5959 – Rostrolaetilia eureka
- 5960 W – Rostrolaetilia nigromaculella
- 5961 – Rostrolaetilia ardiferella
- 5962 W – Rostrolaetilia texanella
- 5963 – Rostrolaetilia pinalensis
- 5964 – Welderella parvella
- 5965 – Baphala pallida
- 5965.1 – Baphala eremiella
- 5965.2 – Baphala phaeolella
- 5966 W – Rhagea packardella
- 5967 – Rhagea stigmella
- 5968 – Zophodia grossulariella, gooseberry fruitworm moth
- 5968.1 W – Zophodia multistriatella
- 5969 – Zophodia epischnioides
- 5970 – Melitara prodenialis, eastern cactus-boring moth
- 5970.1 – Cactoblastis cactorum, cactus moth
- 5971 W – Melitara dentata
- 5971.1 W – Melitara doddalis
- 5971.2 – Melitara texana
- 5971.3 – Melitara apicigrammella
- 5972 W – Melitara junctolineella
- 5973 W – Melitara subumbrella
- 5974 W – Alberada parabates
- 5975 W – Alberada bidentella
- 5975.1 – Alberada californiensis
- 5975.2 – Alberada franclemonti
- 5975.3 – Alberada candida
- 5977 W – Cahela ponderosella, cahela moth
- 5978 – Rumatha glaucatella
- 5979 W – Rumatha bihinda
- 5979.1 – Rumatha jacumba
- 5980 W – Rumatha polingella
- 5981 W – Yosemitia graciella
- 5983 – Yosemitia fieldiella
- 5984 W – Eremberga leuconips
- 5985 – Eremberga creabates
- 5986 – Eremberga insignis
- 5987 – Ozamia fuscomaculella
- 5987.1 – Ozamia clarefacta
- 5988 – Ozamia thalassophila
- 5988.1 – Ozamia lucidalis
- 5989 W – Cactobrosis fernaldialis
- 5991 W – Echinocereta strigalis
- 5992 – Lascelina canens
- 5993 – Metephestia simplicula
- 5993.1 – Protasia mirabilicornella
- 5994 – Selga arizonella
- 5994.1 – Selga californica
- 5994.2 W – Pseudocabima arizonensis
- 5994.3 – Pseudocabotia balconiensis
- 5995 – Euzophera semifuneralis, American plum borer moth
- 5995.1 – Euzophera aglaeella
- 5995.2 – Euzophera habrella
- 5995.3 W – Euzophera vinnulella
- 5996 – Euzophera magnolialis, magnolia borer moth
- 5997 – Euzophera ostricolorella, root collar borer moth
- 5998 – Euzophera nigricantella
- 5999 – Eulogia ochrifrontella, broad-banded eulogia moth
- 6000 W – Ephestiodes gilvescentella
- 6001 – Ephestiodes infimella
- 6001.1 – Ephestiodes monticolus
- 6002 W – Ephestiodes erythrella
- 6003 – Ephestiodes mignonella
- 6003.1 – Ephestiodes griseus
- 6004 – Ephestiodes erasa
- 6004.1 – Australephestiodes stictella
- 6005 – Moodna ostrinella, darker moodna moth
- 6005.1 – Moodna pallidostrinella, paler moodna moth
- 6006 – Moodna bisinuella
- 6007 – Vitula edmandsii, dried fruit moth
- 6007.1 – Vitula serratilineella, beehive honey moth
- 6008 – Vitula lugubrella
- 6009 W – Vitula pinei
- 6009.1 W – Vitula aegerella
- 6009.2 – Vitula insula
- 6009.3 – Vitula coconinoana
- 6010 – Vitula setonella
- 6011 – Vitula broweri, Brower's vitula moth
- 6012 – Caudellia apyrella, crescent-winged caudellia moth
- 6012.1 – Caudellia flordensis
- 6014 W – Caudellia nigrella
- 6014.1 – Volatica gallivorella
- 6015 W – Sosipatra rileyella
- 6016 W – Sosipatra anthophila
- 6016.1 – Sosipatra proximanthophila
- 6017 – Sosipatra thurberiae
- 6017.1 – Sosipatra knudsoni
- 6018 – Sosipatra nonparilella
- 6018.1 – Ribua droozi
- 6018.2 – Heinrichiessa sanpetella
- 6019 – Plodia interpunctella, Indian meal moth
- 6020 – Ephestia kuehniella, Mediterranean flour moth
- 6020.1 – Ephestia columbiella
- 6020.2 – Uncitruncata leuschneri
- 6021 – Ephestia elutella, tobacco moth
- 6022 – Cadra cautella, almond moth
- 6023 – Cadra figulilella, raisin moth
- 6024 – Bandera binotella
- 6025 – Bandera cupidinella
- 6026 W – Bandera virginella
- 6027 – Wakulla carneella
- 6028 – Tampa dimediatella, tampa moth
- 6029 – Varneria postremella
- 6030 – Varneria atrifasciella
- 6031 – Eurythmia hospitella
- 6031.1 W – Eurythmia spaldingella
- 6031.2 – Eurythmia yavapaella
- 6032 – Eurythmia angulella
- 6033 – Eurythmia fumella
- 6034 – Erelieva quantulella
- 6035 – Erelieva parvulella
- 6036 – Barberia affinitella
- 6036.1 – Bema neuricella
- 6037 W – Cabnia myronella
- 6038 – Anerastia lotella
- 6039 W – Coenochroa californiella
- 6040 W – Coenochroa illibella
- 6041 – Coenochroa bipunctella
- 6042 – Peoria longipalpella, long-palps peoria moth
- 6043 – Peoria bipartitella
- 6044 – Peoria tetradella
- 6045 W – Peoria opacella
- 6046 – Peoria floridella
- 6047 – Peoria rostrella
- 6048 – Peoria gemmatella
- 6049 – Peoria roseotinctella
- 6050 W – Peoria johnstoni
- 6051 – Peoria santaritella
- 6052 – Peoria holoponerella
- 6053 – Peoria approximella, carmine snout moth
- 6054 – Peoria luteicostella
- 6055 – Peoria punctata
- 6056 – Peoria gaudiella
- 6056.1 – Peoria insularis
- 6057 – Tolima cincaidella
- 6058 – Navasota hebetella
- 6059 – Anacostia tribulella
- 6060 – Arivaca pimella
- 6061 – Arivaca linella
- 6062 W – Arivaca ostreella
- 6063 – Arivaca poohella
- 6064 – Arivaca albidella
- 6065 – Arivaca artella
- 6066 – Arivaca albicostella
- 6067 – Atascosa glareosella
- 6067.1 – Atascosa heitzmani
- 6068 – Homosassa ella
- 6069 – Homosassa platella
- 6070 – Homosassa incudella
- 6071 – Homosassa blanchardi
- 6072 – Reynosa floscella
- 6073 – Goya stictella
- 6074 – Goya ovaliger
- 6074.1 – Moodnodes plorella
- 6075 – Uinta oreadella

== Thyrididae ==
- 6076 – Thyris maculata, spotted thyris moth
- 6077 – Thyris sepulchralis, mournful thyris moth
- 6078 – Dysodia oculatana, eyed dysodia moth
- 6079 – Dysodia granulata
- 6080 – Dysodia speculifera
- 6081 – Dysodia flagrata
- 6082 – Hexeris enhydris, seagrape borer moth
- 6085 – Meskea dyspteraria, window-winged moth
- 6086 – Banisia myrsusalis, sapodilla borer moth
- 6087 – Banisia furva

== Hyblaeidae ==
- 6088 – Hyblaea puera, teak defoliator moth

== See also ==
- List of butterflies of North America
- List of Lepidoptera of Hawaii
- List of moths of Canada
- List of butterflies of Canada
