= List of moths of Niger =

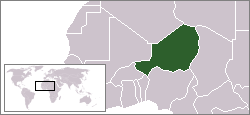
Location of Niger

There are about 190 known moth species of Niger. The moths (mostly nocturnal) and butterflies (mostly diurnal) together make up the taxonomic order Lepidoptera.

This is a list of moth species which have been recorded in Niger.

== Arctiidae ==
- Alpenus affiniola (Strand, 1919)
- Balacra daphaena (Hampson, 1898)
- Cyana trigutta (Walker, 1854)
- Euchromia lethe (Fabricius, 1775)
- Meganaclia sippia (Plötz, 1880)
- Micralarctia punctulatum (Wallengren, 1860)
- Phryganopsis asperatella (Walker, 1864)
- Phryganopsis cinerella (Wallengren, 1860)
- Siccia conformis Hampson, 1914
- Spilosoma aurantiaca (Holland, 1893)

== Cossidae ==
- Azygophleps psyche Le Cerf, 1919
- Hypopta reibelii Oberthür, 1876
- Paropta buchanani Rothschild, 1921

== Crambidae ==
- Achyra coelatalis (Walker, 1859)
- Achyra nudalis (Hübner, 1796)
- Adelpherupa flavescens Hampson, 1919
- Chilo costifusalis (Hampson, 1919)
- Cybalomia azzalana Rothschild, 1921
- Cybalomia ledereri Rothschild, 1921
- Euchromius hampsoni (Rothschild, 1921)
- Euchromius ocellea (Haworth, 1811)
- Euchromius vinculellus (Zeller, 1847)
- Loxostege damergouensis Rothschild, 1921
- Metasia angustipennis Rothschild, 1921
- Metasia parallelalis Rothschild, 1921
- Nomophila noctuella ([Denis & Schiffermüller], 1775)
- Pleuroptya balteata (Fabricius, 1798)
- Prionapteryx albostigmata (Rothschild, 1921)
- Psara bipunctalis (Fabricius, 1794)
- Sceliodes laisalis (Walker, 1859)
- Spoladea recurvalis (Fabricius, 1775)
- Tegostoma comparalis (Hübner, 1796)
- Tegostoma pseudonoctua (Rothschild, 1921)
- Thyridiphora furia (Swinhoe, 1884)

== Eupterotidae ==
- Stenoglene bipartita (Rothschild, 1917)

== Geometridae ==
- Acanthovalva inconspicuaria (Hübner, 1796)
- Acidaliastis micra Hampson, 1896
- Chiasmia feraliata (Guenée, 1858)
- Chiasmia sudanata (Warren & Rothschild, 1905)
- Euproutia aggravaria (Guenée, 1858)
- Hemidromodes robusta (Prout, 1913)
- Idaea fylloidaria (Swinhoe, 1904)
- Isturgia disputaria (Guenée, 1858)
- Isturgia quadriplaga (Rothschild, 1921)
- Lomographa indularia (Guenée, 1858)
- Lophorrhachia palliata (Warren, 1898)
- Microloxia ruficornis Warren, 1897
- Mixocera albistrigata (Pagenstecher, 1893)
- Neostega flaviguttata Warren, 1903
- Pitthea trifasciata Dewitz, 1881
- Pseudosterrha rufistrigata (Hampson, 1896)
- Rhodesia alboviridata (Saalmüller, 1880)
- Scopula nepheloperas (Prout, 1916)
- Zamarada minimaria Swinhoe, 1895
- Zamarada nasuta Warren, 1897
- Zamarada secutaria (Guenée, 1858)
- Zamarada torrida D. S. Fletcher, 1974

== Lasiocampidae ==
- Beralade bistrigata Strand, 1909
- Braura concolor (Rothschild, 1921)
- Euwallengrenia reducta (Walker, 1855)
- Pachymeta immunda (Holland, 1893)
- Pallastica sanricia Zolotuhin & Gurkovich, 2009
- Sena virgo (Oberthür, 1916)

== Limacodidae ==
- Micraphe lateritia Karsch, 1896

== Lymantriidae ==
- Casama griseola Rothschild, 1921
- Casama innotata (Walker, 1855)
- Euproctillina mesomelaena (Holland, 1893)
- Euproctis rivularis Gaede, 1916
- Knappetra fasciata (Walker, 1855)
- Laelaroa flavimargo Hering, 1926
- Liparodonta uniformis Hering, 1927
- Marbla paradoxa (Hering, 1926)

== Metarbelidae ==
- Paralebedella schultzei (Aurivillius, 1905)
- Salagena nigropuncta Le Cerf, 1919

== Noctuidae ==
- Acantholipes circumdata (Walker, 1858)
- Achaea catella Guenée, 1852
- Acontia asbenensis (Rothschild, 1921)
- Acontia basifera Walker, 1857
- Acontia buchanani (Rothschild, 1921)
- Acontia citrelinea Bethune-Baker, 1911
- Acontia gratiosa Wallengren, 1856
- Acontia imitatrix Wallengren, 1856
- Acontia karachiensis Swinhoe, 1889
- Acontia semialba Hampson, 1910
- Acontia sublactea Hacker, Legrain & Fibiger, 2008
- Acontia trimaculata Aurivillius, 1879
- Adisura affinis Rothschild, 1921
- Adisura callima Bethune-Baker, 1911
- Aegocera brevivitta Hampson, 1901
- Aegocera rectilinea Boisduval, 1836
- Agoma trimenii (Felder, 1874)
- Agrotis biconica Kollar, 1844
- Agrotis segetum ([Denis & Schiffermüller], 1775)
- Anarta trifolii (Hufnagel, 1766)
- Ariathisa abyssinia (Guenée, 1852)
- Asplenia melanodonta (Hampson, 1896)
- Cerocala caelata Karsch, 1896
- Chrysodeixis chalcites (Esper, 1789)
- Crypsotidia maculifera (Staudinger, 1898)
- Crypsotidia mesosema Hampson, 1913
- Crypsotidia remanei Wiltshire, 1977
- Cyligramma latona (Cramer, 1775)
- Dysgonia torrida (Guenée, 1852)
- Eublemma bipars Gaede, 1935
- Eublemma cochylioides (Guenée, 1852)
- Eublemma deserti (Rothschild, 1909)
- Eublemma dissoluta Rothschild, 1921
- Eublemma parva (Hübner, [1808])
- Eublemma perkeo Rothschild, 1921
- Eulocastra aethiops (Distant, 1898)
- Eulocastra pseudozarboides Rothschild, 1921
- Eulocastra sahariensis Rothschild, 1921
- Gnamptonyx innexa (Walker, 1858)
- Grammodes buchanani Rothschild, 1921
- Grammodes stolida (Fabricius, 1775)
- Helicoverpa armigera (Hübner, [1808])
- Helicoverpa zea (Boddie, 1850)
- Heliocheilus confertissima (Walker, 1865)
- Heliothis flavigera (Hampson, 1907)
- Heliothis nubigera Herrich-Schäffer, 1851
- Heliothis peltigera ([Denis & Schiffermüller], 1775)
- Heteropalpia acrosticta (Püngeler, 1904)
- Hypena obacerralis Walker, [1859]
- Masalia albiseriata (Druce, 1903)
- Masalia decorata (Moore, 1881)
- Masalia nubila (Hampson, 1903)
- Masalia terracottoides (Rothschild, 1921)
- Melanephia nigrescens (Wallengren, 1856)
- Melanephia trista (Snellen, 1872)
- Mitrophrys magna (Walker, 1854)
- Mitrophrys menete (Cramer, 1775)
- Mocis frugalis (Fabricius, 1775)
- Mocis proverai Zilli, 2000
- Ozarba damagarima Rothschild, 1921
- Ozarba punctigera Walker, 1865
- Ozarba rubrivena Hampson, 1910
- Pandesma robusta (Walker, 1858)
- Plecopterodes moderata (Wallengren, 1860)
- Polydesma umbricola Boisduval, 1833
- Pseudozarba abbreviata Rothschild, 1921
- Pseudozarba bella Rothschild, 1921
- Pseudozarba bipartita (Herrich-Schäffer, 1950)
- Pseudozarba opella (Swinhoe, 1885)
- Rhynchina buchanani Rothschild, 1921
- Rhynchina sahariensis Rothschild, 1921
- Spodoptera cilium Guenée, 1852
- Spodoptera exempta (Walker, 1857)
- Spodoptera exigua (Hübner, 1808)
- Spodoptera mauritia (Boisduval, 1833)
- Tathorhynchus exsiccata (Lederer, 1855)
- Trichoplusia ni (Hübner, [1803])

== Notodontidae ==
- Desmeocraera latex (Druce, 1901)
- Scrancia leucopera Hampson, 1910

== Pantheidae ==
- Raphia buchanani Rothschild, 1921

== Pyralidae ==
- Abrephia gracilis (Rothschild, 1921)
- Abrephia inconspicua (Rothschild, 1921)
- Aglossa pinguinalis (Linnaeus, 1758)
- Ancylosis cretaceogrisea (Rothschild, 1921)
- Ancylosis faustinella (Zeller, 1867)
- Ancylosis limoniella (Chrétien, 1911)
- Ancylosis medioalba (Rothschild, 1921)
- Bostra asbenicola Rothschild, 1921
- Crocalia africana Rothschild, 1921
- Crocidomera intensifasciata Rothschild, 1921
- Epicrocis sahariensis (Rothschild, 1921)
- Homoeosoma asbenicola Rothschild, 1921
- Homoeosoma basalis Rothschild, 1921
- Homoeosoma botydella Ragonot, 1888
- Homoeosoma straminea Rothschild, 1921
- Macalla soudanensis (Rothschild, 1921)
- Mussidia nigrivenella Ragonot, 1888
- Nephopterix dubiosa (Rothschild, 1921)
- Pempelia interniplagella (Ragonot, 1888)
- Pogononeura buchanani Rothschild, 1921
- Pterothrixidia damergouensis (Rothschild, 1921)
- Tephris buchanani (Rothschild, 1921)
- Trachypteryx eximia (Rothschild, 1921)
- Tyndis umbrosus Rothschild, 1921

== Saturniidae ==
- Bunaeopsis hersilia (Westwood, 1849)
- Epiphora bauhiniae (Guérin-Méneville, 1832)
- Holocerina angulata (Aurivillius, 1893)
- Lobobunaea phaedusa (Drury, 1782)
- Pseudantheraea discrepans (Butler, 1878)

== Sphingidae ==
- Neopolyptychus spurrelli (Rothschild & Jordan, 1912)

== Tineidae ==
- Hapsifera niphoxantha Gozmány, 1965

== Tortricidae ==
- Eccopsis wahlbergiana Zeller, 1852

== Zygaenidae ==
- Saliunca mimetica Jordan, 1907
- Saliunca nkolentangensis Strand, 1913
