= Sunflower moth =

Sunflower moths may be three species of moths, whose larvae are pests of sunflowers:

- Homoeosoma electellum, American sunflower moth
- Homoeosoma nebulella, Eurasian sunflower moth
- Heterocampa cubana, sunflower moth found in Cuba and the US state of Florida
