= Homoeosoma stenopis =

Scientific classification
- Kingdom: Animalia
- Phylum: Arthropoda
- Clade: Pancrustacea
- Class: Insecta
- Order: Lepidoptera
- Family: Pyralidae
- Genus: Homoeosoma
- Species: H. stenopis

Binomial name
- Homoeosoma stenopis Turner, 1904

Species of moth

Homoeosoma stenopis is a species of snout moth in the genus Homoeosoma. It was described by Alfred Jefferis Turner in 1904. It is found in Australia.
