= Homoeosoma privata =

Scientific classification
- Kingdom: Animalia
- Phylum: Arthropoda
- Clade: Pancrustacea
- Class: Insecta
- Order: Lepidoptera
- Family: Pyralidae
- Genus: Homoeosoma
- Species: H. privata

Binomial name
- Homoeosoma privata (Walker in Melliss, 1875)

Synonyms
- Nephoteryx privata Walker in Melliss, 1875

Species of moth

Homoeosoma privata is a species of snout moth in the genus Homoeosoma. It was described by Francis Walker in 1875 and is known from St. Helena.
