= Homoeosoma quinquepunctella =

Scientific classification
- Kingdom: Animalia
- Phylum: Arthropoda
- Clade: Pancrustacea
- Class: Insecta
- Order: Lepidoptera
- Family: Pyralidae
- Genus: Homoeosoma
- Species: H. quinquepunctella

Binomial name
- Homoeosoma quinquepunctella (Warren, 1914)

Synonyms
- Ematheudes quinquepunctella Warren, 1914

Species of moth

Homoeosoma quinquepunctella is a species of snout moth in the genus Homoeosoma. It was described by Warren in 1914. It is found in South Africa.
