= Homoeosoma incognitellum =

Scientific classification
- Kingdom: Animalia
- Phylum: Arthropoda
- Clade: Pancrustacea
- Class: Insecta
- Order: Lepidoptera
- Family: Pyralidae
- Genus: Homoeosoma
- Species: H. incognitellum

Binomial name
- Homoeosoma incognitellum Roesler, 1965

Species of moth

Homoeosoma incognitellum is a species of snout moth in the genus Homoeosoma. It was described by Roesler in 1965. It is found in France.
