= Homoeosoma terminella =

Scientific classification
- Kingdom: Animalia
- Phylum: Arthropoda
- Clade: Pancrustacea
- Class: Insecta
- Order: Lepidoptera
- Family: Pyralidae
- Genus: Homoeosoma
- Species: H. terminella

Binomial name
- Homoeosoma terminella Hampson, 1901

Species of moth

Homoeosoma terminella is a species of snout moth in the genus Homoeosoma. It was described by Hampson, 1901 to complete an unfinished work by Ragonot. It is found in South Africa.
