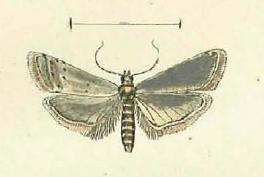
- Homoeosoma nimbella

Scientific classification
- Domain: Eukaryota
- Kingdom: Animalia
- Phylum: Arthropoda
- Class: Insecta
- Order: Lepidoptera
- Family: Pyralidae
- Subfamily: Phycitinae
- Tribe: Phycitini
- Genus: Homoeosoma; J. Curtis, 1833

Synonyms
- Anhomoeosoma Roesler, 1965; Homaeosoma Westwood, 1840; Homoesoma Hampson, 1908; Lotria Guenée, 1845; Phycidea Zeller, 1839

= Homoeosoma =

Genus of moths

Homoeosoma is a genus of moths of the family Pyralidae.

== Species ==
- Homoeosoma achroeella Ragonot, 1887
- Homoeosoma albescentellum Ragonot, 1887
- Homoeosoma albicosta (Turner, 1947)
- Homoeosoma albosparsum (Butler, 1881)
- Homoeosoma ammonastes Goodson & Neunzig, 1993
- Homoeosoma ardaloniphas Goodson & Neunzig, 1993
- Homoeosoma asbenicola Rothschild, 1921
- Homoeosoma asylonnastes Goodson & Neunzig, 1993
- Homoeosoma atechna Turner, 1947
- Homoeosoma basalis Rothschild, 1921
- Homoeosoma botydella Ragonot, 1888
- Homoeosoma calcella Ragonot, 1887
- Homoeosoma candefactella Ragonot, 1887
- Homoeosoma capsitanella Chrétien, 1911
- Homoeosoma caradjellum Roesler, 1965
- Homoeosoma centrosticha Turner, 1947
- Homoeosoma contracta Turner, 1947
- Homoeosoma costalbella Amsel, 1954
- Homoeosoma deceptorium Heinrich, 1956
- Homoeosoma electellum (Hulst, 1887) – American sunflower moth
- Homoeosoma emandator Heinrich, 1956
- Homoeosoma ephestidiella Hampson, 1896
- Homoeosoma eremophasma Goodson & Neunzig, 1993
- Homoeosoma fornacella (Meyrick, 1879)
- Homoeosoma gravosellum Roesler, 1965
- Homoeosoma illuviellum Ragonot, 1888
- Homoeosoma impressale Hulst, 1886
- Homoeosoma incognitellum Roesler, 1965
- Homoeosoma inornatellum (Hulst, 1900)
- Homoeosoma inustella Ragonot, 1884
- Homoeosoma ischnopa (Turner, 1947)
- Homoeosoma lechriosema Turner, 1947
- Homoeosoma masaiensis Balinsky, 1991
- Homoeosoma matsumurella Shibuya, 1927
- Homoeosoma miguelensis Meyer, Nuss & Speidel, 1997
- Homoeosoma nanophasma Neunzig, 1997
- Homoeosoma nebulella Denis & Schiffermüller, 1775 – Eurasian sunflower moth
- Homoeosoma nevadellum Roesler, 1965
- Homoeosoma nimbella (Duponchel, 1836)
- Homoeosoma obatricostella Ragonot, 1887
- Homoeosoma oslarellum Dyar, 1905
- Homoeosoma oxycercus Goodson & Neunzig, 1993
- Homoeosoma parvalbum Blanchard & Knudson, 1985
- Homoeosoma pedionnastes Goodson & Neunzig, 1993
- Homoeosoma pelosticta Turner, 1947
- Homoeosoma phaeoboreas Goodson & Neunzig, 1993
- Homoeosoma phaulopa (Turner, 1947)
- Homoeosoma picoensis Meyer, Nuss & Speidel, 1997
- Homoeosoma privata (Walker in Melliss, 1875)
- Homoeosoma punctistrigellum Ragonot, 1888
- Homoeosoma quinquepunctella (Warren, 1914)
- Homoeosoma scopulella Ragonot, 1888
- Homoeosoma sinuella (Fabricius, 1794)
- Homoeosoma soaltheirellum Roesler, 1965
- Homoeosoma stenopis Turner, 1904
- Homoeosoma stenotea Hampson, 1926
- Homoeosoma straminea Rothschild, 1921
- Homoeosoma striatellum Dyar, 1905
- Homoeosoma stypticellum Grote, 1878
- Homoeosoma terminella Ragonot, 1901
- Homoeosoma uncanale Hulst, 1886
- Homoeosoma vagella Zeller, 1848
