= Homoeosoma achroeella =

Scientific classification
- Kingdom: Animalia
- Phylum: Arthropoda
- Clade: Pancrustacea
- Class: Insecta
- Order: Lepidoptera
- Family: Pyralidae
- Genus: Homoeosoma
- Species: H. achroeella

Binomial name
- Homoeosoma achroeella Ragonot, 1887

Species of moth

Homoeosoma achroeella is a species of snout moth in the genus Homoeosoma. It was described by Émile Louis Ragonot in 1887, and is known from Kazakhstan and Turkey.
