= Homoeosoma obatricostella =

Scientific classification
- Kingdom: Animalia
- Phylum: Arthropoda
- Clade: Pancrustacea
- Class: Insecta
- Order: Lepidoptera
- Family: Pyralidae
- Genus: Homoeosoma
- Species: H. obatricostella

Binomial name
- Homoeosoma obatricostella Ragonot, 1887

Species of moth

Homoeosoma obatricostella is a species of snout moth in the genus Homoeosoma. It was described by Émile Louis Ragonot in 1887, and is known from Iran.
