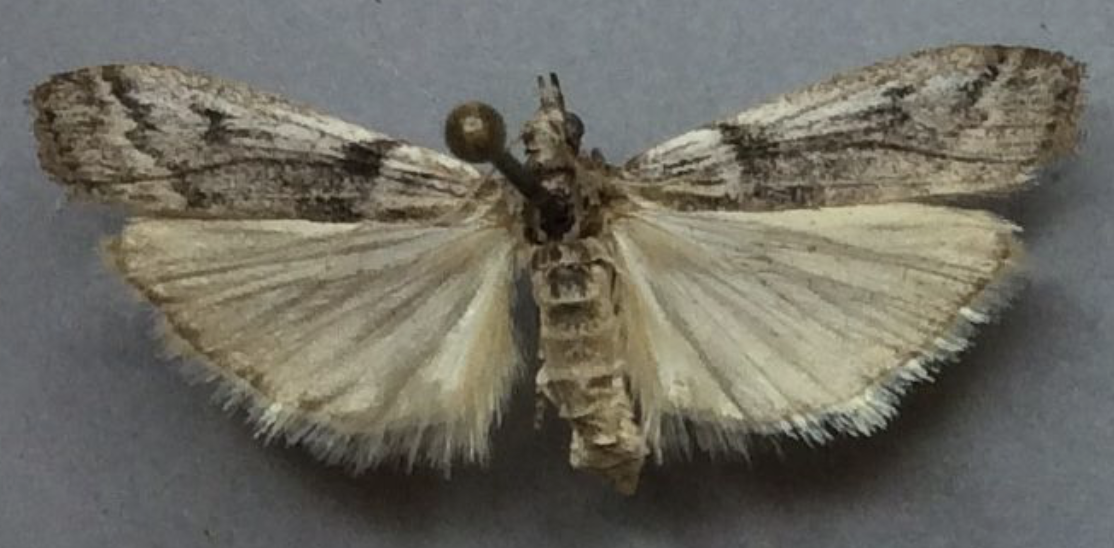

Scientific classification
- Kingdom: Animalia
- Phylum: Arthropoda
- Clade: Pancrustacea
- Class: Insecta
- Order: Lepidoptera
- Family: Pyralidae
- Genus: Homoeosoma
- Species: H. uncanale

Binomial name
- Homoeosoma uncanale Hulst, 1886

= Homoeosoma uncanale =

Species of moth

Homoeosoma uncanale is a species of snout moth in the genus Homoeosoma. It was described by George Duryea Hulst in 1886. It is found in North America, including Arizona and California.

== Taxonomy ==
It was previously treated as a synonym of Homoeosoma impressalis.
