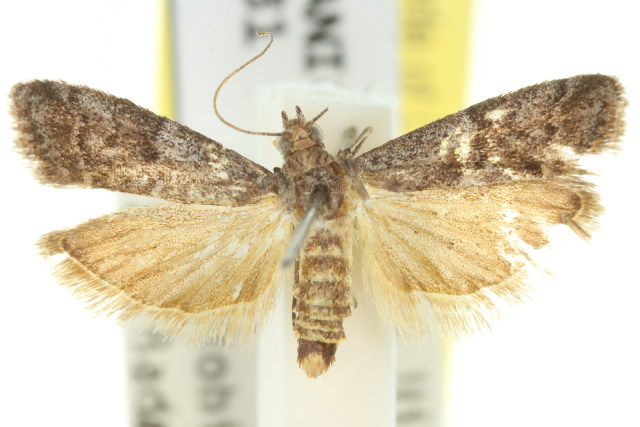

Scientific classification
- Kingdom: Animalia
- Phylum: Arthropoda
- Clade: Pancrustacea
- Class: Insecta
- Order: Lepidoptera
- Family: Pyralidae
- Genus: Homoeosoma
- Species: H. fornacella

Binomial name
- Homoeosoma fornacella (Meyrick, 1879)

Synonyms
- Nephopteryx fornacella Meyrick, 1879

= Homoeosoma fornacella =

Species of moth

Homoeosoma fornacella is a species of snout moth in the genus Homoeosoma. It is found in Australia.
