= Homoeosoma emandator =

Scientific classification
- Kingdom: Animalia
- Phylum: Arthropoda
- Clade: Pancrustacea
- Class: Insecta
- Order: Lepidoptera
- Family: Pyralidae
- Genus: Homoeosoma
- Species: H. emandator

Binomial name
- Homoeosoma emandator Heinrich, 1956

Species of moth

Homoeosoma emandator is a species of snout moth in the genus Homoeosoma. It was described by Carl Heinrich in 1956. It is found in North America.

== Taxonomy ==
It was previously treated as a subspecies of Homoeosoma illuviella.
