= Homoeosoma capsitanella =

Scientific classification
- Kingdom: Animalia
- Phylum: Arthropoda
- Clade: Pancrustacea
- Class: Insecta
- Order: Lepidoptera
- Family: Pyralidae
- Genus: Homoeosoma
- Species: H. capsitanella

Binomial name
- Homoeosoma capsitanella Chrétien, 1911

Synonyms
- Homoeosoma litorella Amsel, 1935

Species of moth

Homoeosoma capsitanella is a species of snout moth in the genus Homoeosoma. It was described by Pierre Chrétien in 1911. It is found in the Palestinian territories and Israel.

The wingspan is 18–20 mm.
