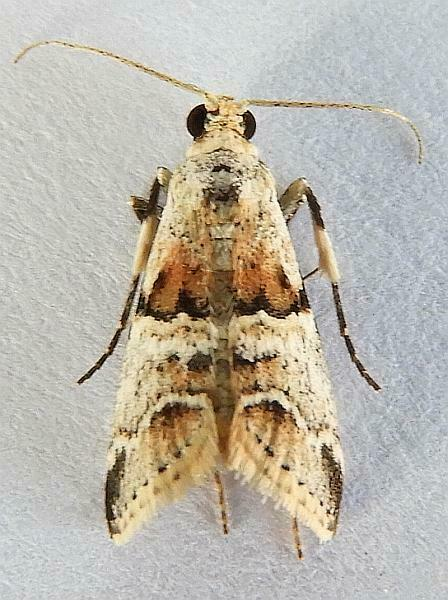

Scientific classification
- Kingdom: Animalia
- Phylum: Arthropoda
- Class: Insecta
- Order: Lepidoptera
- Family: Pyralidae
- Genus: Tallula
- Species: T. watsoni

Binomial name
- Tallula watsoni Barnes & McDunnough, 1916

= Tallula watsoni =

Species of moth

Tallula watsoni, or Watson's tallula moth, is a species of moth in the family Pyralidae. The species was first described by William Barnes and James Halliday McDunnough in 1916.

The MONA or Hodges number for Tallula watsoni is 5592.
