= Homoeosoma punctistrigella =

Scientific classification
- Kingdom: Animalia
- Phylum: Arthropoda
- Clade: Pancrustacea
- Class: Insecta
- Order: Lepidoptera
- Family: Pyralidae
- Genus: Homoeosoma
- Species: H. punctistrigella

Binomial name
- Homoeosoma punctistrigella Ragonot, 1888

Synonyms
- Homoeosoma punctistrigellum

Species of moth

Homoeosoma punctistrigella is a species of snout moth in the genus Homoeosoma. It was described by Ragonot in 1888. It is found in India, Israel and Russia.

The wingspan is about 28 mm.
