= Homoeosoma picoensis =

Scientific classification
- Kingdom: Animalia
- Phylum: Arthropoda
- Clade: Pancrustacea
- Class: Insecta
- Order: Lepidoptera
- Family: Pyralidae
- Genus: Homoeosoma
- Species: H. picoensis

Binomial name
- Homoeosoma picoensis Meyer, Nuss & Speidel, 1997

Species of moth

Homoeosoma picoensis is a species of snout moth in the genus Homoeosoma. It was described by Meyer, Nuss and Speidel in 1997, and is known from the Azores.
