= Homoeosoma phaulopa =

Scientific classification
- Kingdom: Animalia
- Phylum: Arthropoda
- Clade: Pancrustacea
- Class: Insecta
- Order: Lepidoptera
- Family: Pyralidae
- Genus: Homoeosoma
- Species: H. phaulopa

Binomial name
- Homoeosoma phaulopa (Turner, 1947)

Synonyms
- Euzopherodes phaulopa Turner, 1947

Species of moth

Homoeosoma phaulopa is a species of snout moth in the genus Homoeosoma. It was described by Alfred Jefferis Turner in 1947. It is found in Australia.
