= Homoeosoma masaiensis =

Scientific classification
- Kingdom: Animalia
- Phylum: Arthropoda
- Clade: Pancrustacea
- Class: Insecta
- Order: Lepidoptera
- Family: Pyralidae
- Genus: Homoeosoma
- Species: H. masaiensis

Binomial name
- Homoeosoma masaiensis Balinsky, 1991

Synonyms
- Homoeosoma massaicum; Homoeosoma massaiensis

Species of moth

Homoeosoma masaiensis is a species of snout moth in the genus Homoeosoma. It was described by Boris Balinsky in 1991 and is known from South Africa.
