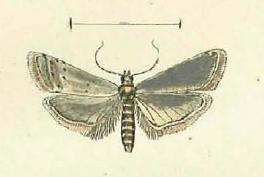

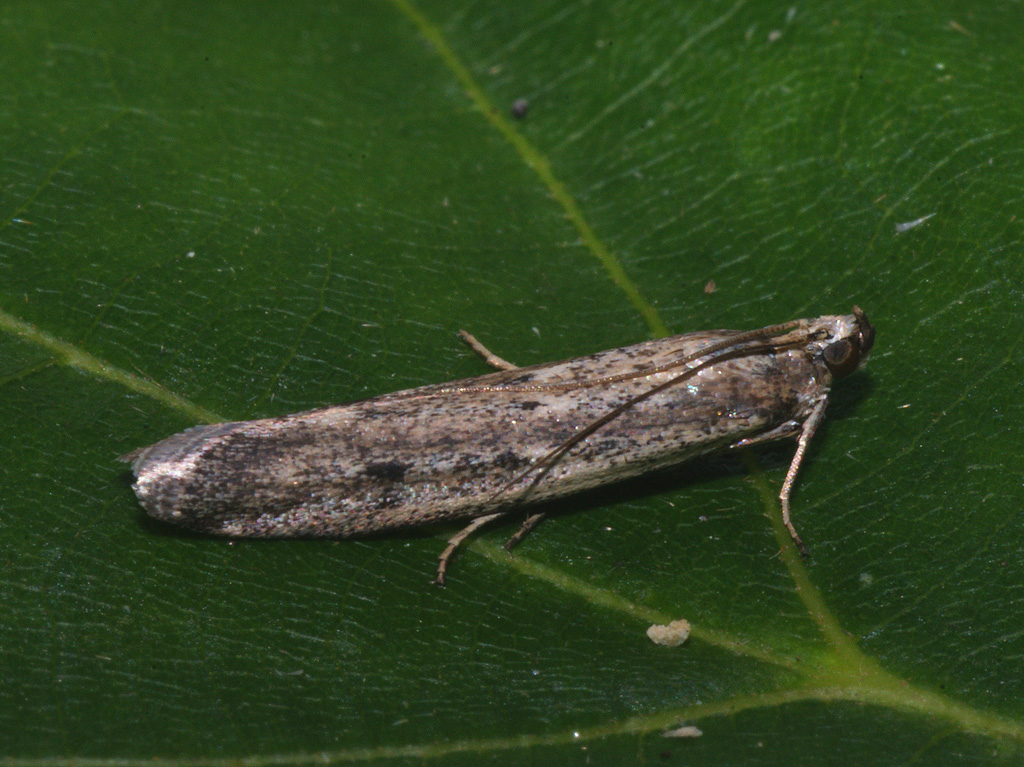

Scientific classification
- Kingdom: Animalia
- Phylum: Arthropoda
- Clade: Pancrustacea
- Class: Insecta
- Order: Lepidoptera
- Family: Pyralidae
- Genus: Homoeosoma
- Species: H. nimbella

Binomial name
- Homoeosoma nimbella (Duponchel, 1837)

Synonyms
- Phycis nimbella Duponchel, 1837; Ephestia homoeosomella Zerny in Kautz, Rebel & Zerny, 1926; Homoeosoma snellenella Bentinck, 1930; Myelois subalbatella Mann, 1864; Anerastia nimbella Zeller, 1839

= Homoeosoma nimbella =

Species of moth

Homoeosoma nimbella is a moth of the family Pyralidae. It is found in Europe.

The wingspan is 16–21 mm. The forewings are light ochreous, sometimes greyish-tinged, more or less sprinkled with dark fuscous, towards costa more or less broadly suffused with white; first line indicated by an angulated oblique series of three blackish dots, second straight, almost obsolete, hardly dark-edged; two blackish transversely placed discal dots. Hindwings pale fuscous. Larva yellowish-green;dorsal line, subdorsal series of spots or rings, and spiracular series of three marks on each segment purplish; head dark brown; plate of 2 yellow-brown, posterior edge black: in flowers of Anthemis, Jasione, Senecio, etc.

The moths are on wing from May to August depending on the location.

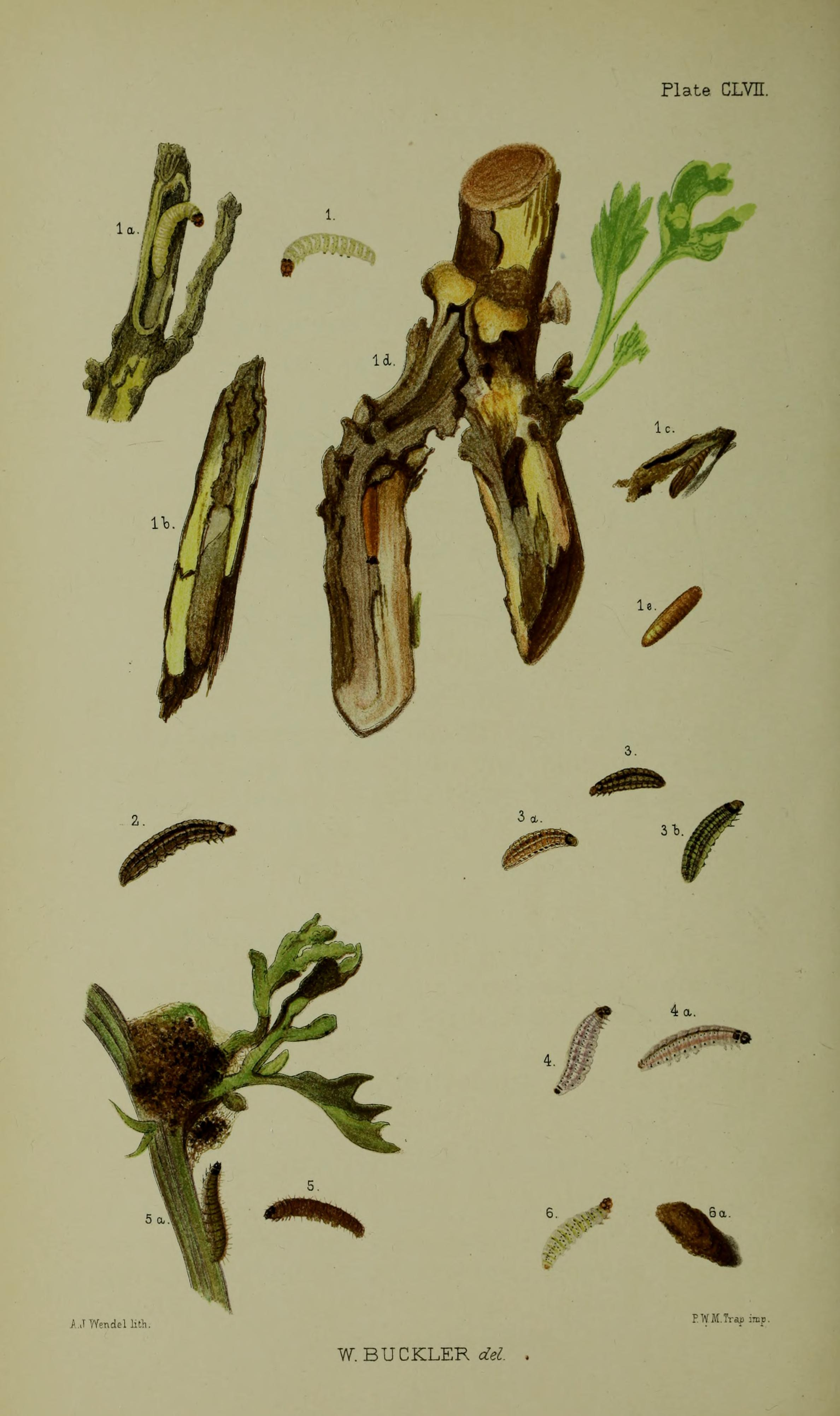
Figs. 3, 3a, 3b larvae in various stages of growth

The larvae probably feed on the flowers or fruit of Asteraceae species.
