= Homoeosoma costalbella =

Scientific classification
- Kingdom: Animalia
- Phylum: Arthropoda
- Clade: Pancrustacea
- Class: Insecta
- Order: Lepidoptera
- Family: Pyralidae
- Genus: Homoeosoma
- Species: H. costalbella

Binomial name
- Homoeosoma costalbella Amsel, 1954

Species of moth

Homoeosoma costalbella is a species of snout moth in the genus Homoeosoma. It was described by Hans Georg Amsel in 1954 and is known from Iraq.
