= Homoeosoma soaltheirellum =

Scientific classification
- Kingdom: Animalia
- Phylum: Arthropoda
- Clade: Pancrustacea
- Class: Insecta
- Order: Lepidoptera
- Family: Pyralidae
- Genus: Homoeosoma
- Species: H. soaltheirellum

Binomial name
- Homoeosoma soaltheirellum Roesler, 1965

Species of moth

Homoeosoma soaltheirellum is a species of snout moth in the genus Homoeosoma. It was described by Roesler in 1965 from Soaltheira, Portugal, from which its species epithet is derived. It has also been recorded from Spain.
