= Homoeosoma nevadellum =

Scientific classification
- Kingdom: Animalia
- Phylum: Arthropoda
- Clade: Pancrustacea
- Class: Insecta
- Order: Lepidoptera
- Family: Pyralidae
- Genus: Homoeosoma
- Species: H. nevadellum

Binomial name
- Homoeosoma nevadellum Roesler, 1965

Species of moth

Homoeosoma nevadellum is a species of snout moth in the genus Homoeosoma. It was described by Roesler in 1965, and is known from Spain.
