= Homoeosoma albosparsum =

Scientific classification
- Kingdom: Animalia
- Phylum: Arthropoda
- Clade: Pancrustacea
- Class: Insecta
- Order: Lepidoptera
- Family: Pyralidae
- Genus: Homoeosoma
- Species: H. albosparsum

Binomial name
- Homoeosoma albosparsum (Butler, 1881)

Synonyms
- Ephestia albosparsa Butler, 1881; Homoeosoma amphibola Meyrick, 1899

Species of moth

Homoeosoma albosparsum is a moth of the family Pyralidae described by Arthur Gardiner Butler in 1881. It is endemic to the Hawaiian islands of Kauai, Oahu, Maui and Hawaii.
