= Homoeosoma centrosticha =

Scientific classification
- Kingdom: Animalia
- Phylum: Arthropoda
- Clade: Pancrustacea
- Class: Insecta
- Order: Lepidoptera
- Family: Pyralidae
- Genus: Homoeosoma
- Species: H. centrosticha

Binomial name
- Homoeosoma centrosticha Turner, 1947

Species of moth

Homoeosoma centrosticha is a species of snout moth in the genus Homoeosoma. It is found in Australia.
