= Homoeosoma ephestidiella =

Scientific classification
- Kingdom: Animalia
- Phylum: Arthropoda
- Clade: Pancrustacea
- Class: Insecta
- Order: Lepidoptera
- Family: Pyralidae
- Genus: Homoeosoma
- Species: H. ephestidiella

Binomial name
- Homoeosoma ephestidiella Hampson, 1896

Species of moth

Homoeosoma ephestidiella is a species of snout moth in the genus Homoeosoma. It was described by George Hampson in 1896. It is found in India, as well as on the Malay Archipelago, Fiji, the Pacific islands east of Samoa and American Samoa itself.

The larvae feed on Ageratum conyzoides. They feed in the flower heads of their host plant.
