= Homoeosoma caradjellum =

Scientific classification
- Kingdom: Animalia
- Phylum: Arthropoda
- Clade: Pancrustacea
- Class: Insecta
- Order: Lepidoptera
- Family: Pyralidae
- Genus: Homoeosoma
- Species: H. caradjellum

Binomial name
- Homoeosoma caradjellum Roesler, 1965

Synonyms
- Homoeosoma caradjella

Species of moth

Homoeosoma caradjellum is a species of snout moth in the genus Homoeosoma. It was described by Roesler in 1965. It is found in the Russian Far East.
