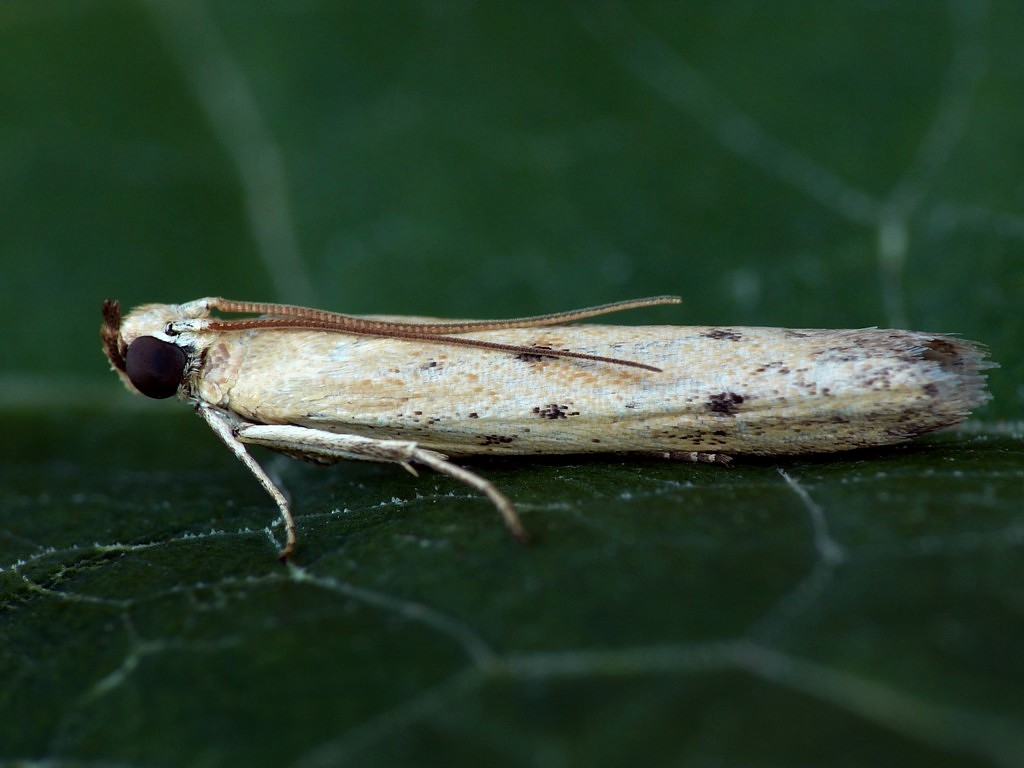

Scientific classification
- Kingdom: Animalia
- Phylum: Arthropoda
- Clade: Pancrustacea
- Class: Insecta
- Order: Lepidoptera
- Family: Pyralidae
- Genus: Homoeosoma
- Species: H. inustella

Binomial name
- Homoeosoma inustella Ragonot, 1884

= Homoeosoma inustella =

Species of moth

Homoeosoma inustella is a species of snout moth in the genus Homoeosoma. It was described by Ragonot in 1884. It is found in Spain, France, Italy, Switzerland, Austria, the Czech Republic, Slovakia, Hungary, Romania, Bulgaria, North Macedonia, Ukraine, Belarus and Russia.

The wingspan is about 20 mm.
