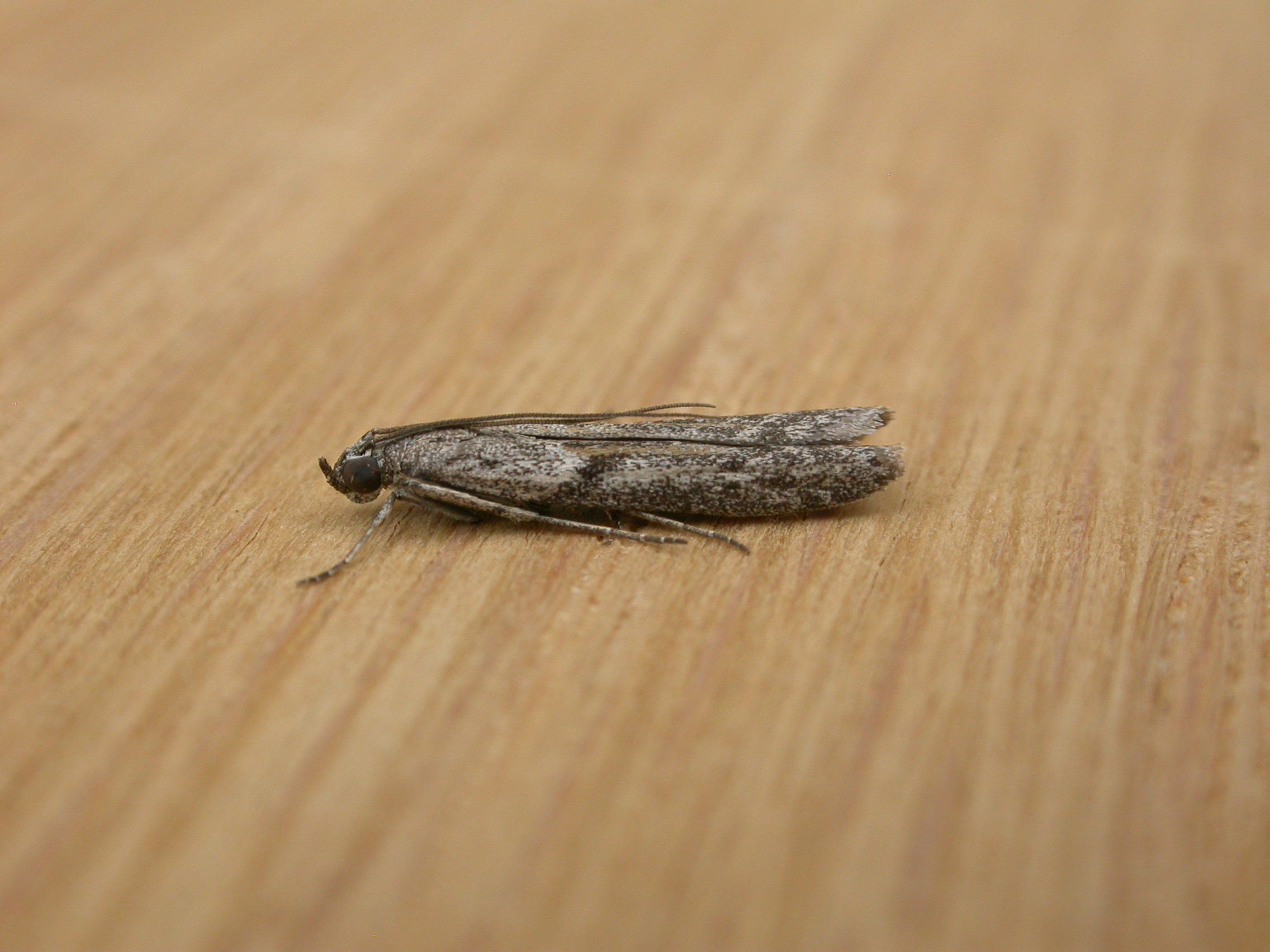

Scientific classification
- Kingdom: Animalia
- Phylum: Arthropoda
- Clade: Pancrustacea
- Class: Insecta
- Order: Lepidoptera
- Family: Pyralidae
- Genus: Homoeosoma
- Species: H. vagella

Binomial name
- Homoeosoma vagella Zeller, 1848

= Homoeosoma vagella =

Species of moth

Homoeosoma vagella, the macadamia flower caterpillar, is a species of snout moth in the genus Homoeosoma. It was described by Philipp Christoph Zeller in 1848. It is found in Australia.

The larvae feed on Macadamia ternifolia. They destroy the flowers of their host plant.
