= Homoeosoma atechna =

Scientific classification
- Kingdom: Animalia
- Phylum: Arthropoda
- Clade: Pancrustacea
- Class: Insecta
- Order: Lepidoptera
- Family: Pyralidae
- Genus: Homoeosoma
- Species: H. atechna

Binomial name
- Homoeosoma atechna Turner, 1947

Species of moth

Homoeosoma atechna is a species of snout moth in the genus Homoeosoma. It is found in Australia.
