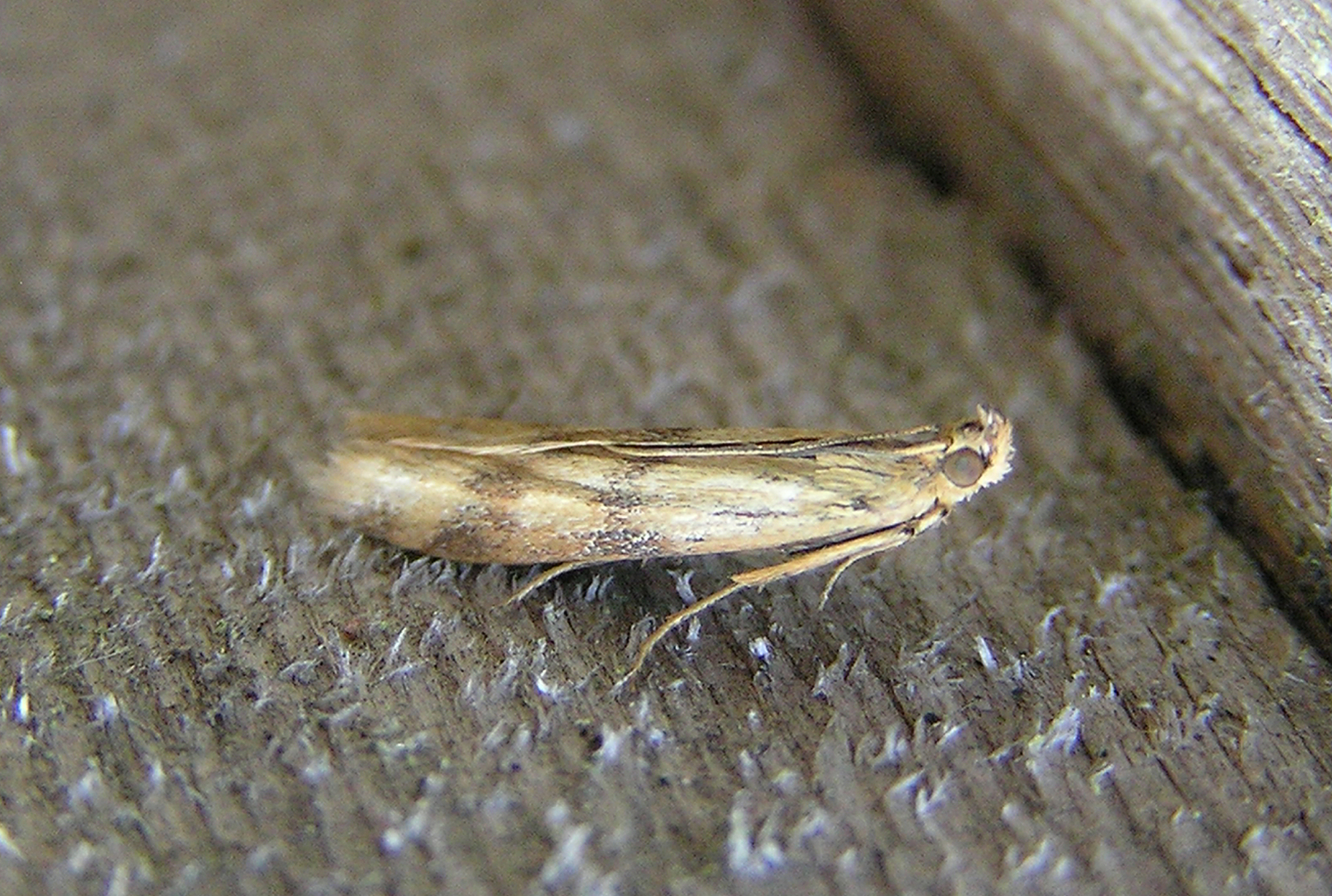

Scientific classification
- Kingdom: Animalia
- Phylum: Arthropoda
- Clade: Pancrustacea
- Class: Insecta
- Order: Lepidoptera
- Family: Pyralidae
- Genus: Homoeosoma
- Species: H. sinuella

Binomial name
- Homoeosoma sinuella (Fabricius, 1794)

Synonyms
- Tinea sinuella Fabricius, 1794; Phycis gemina Haworth, 1811

= Homoeosoma sinuella =

Species of moth

Homoeosoma sinuella is a moth of the family Pyralidae. It is found in Europe.

The wingspan is 18–23 mm. The moths are on wing from May to August depending on the location.

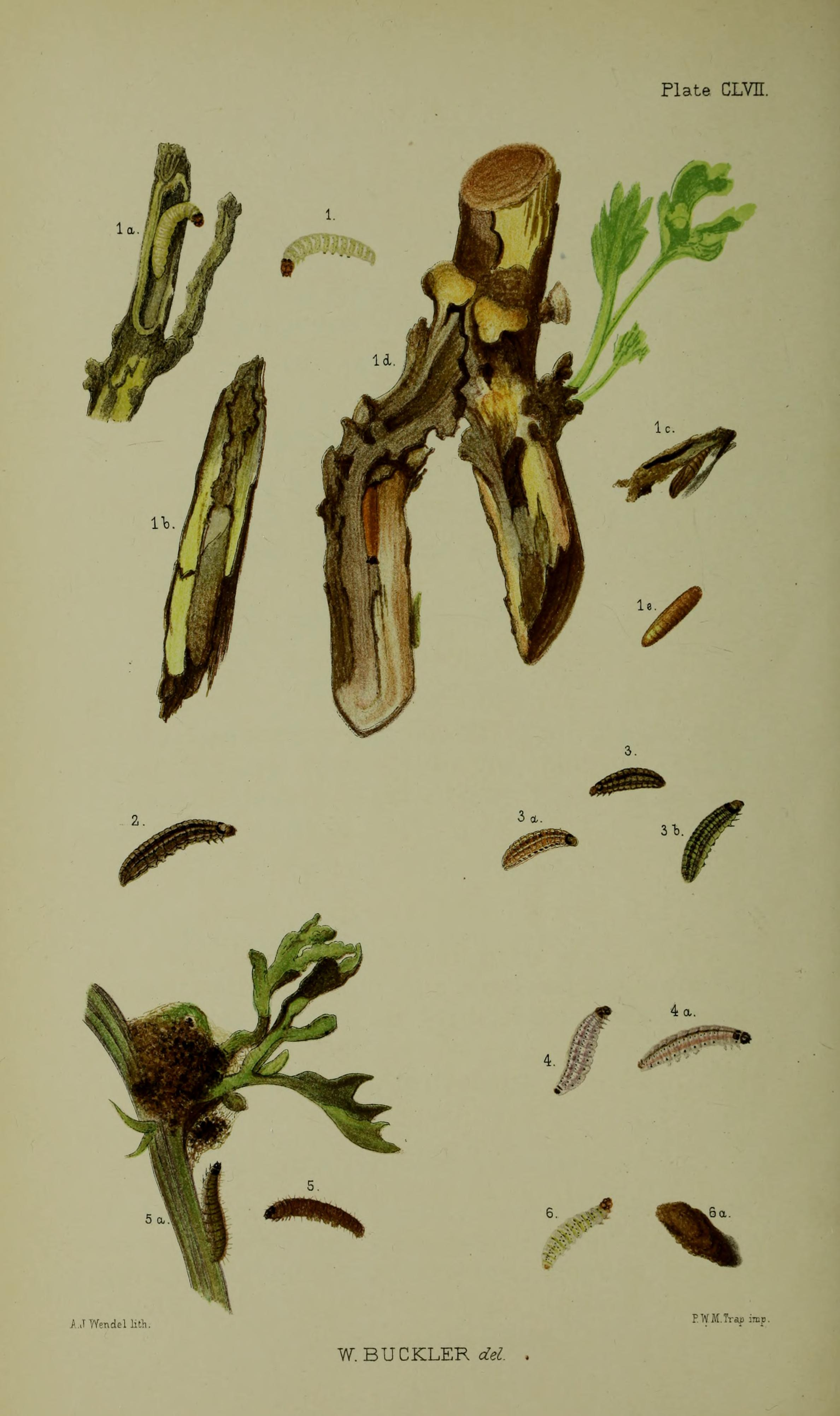
Figs. 6 larva after final moult 6a cocoon

The larvae feed on Plantago species.
