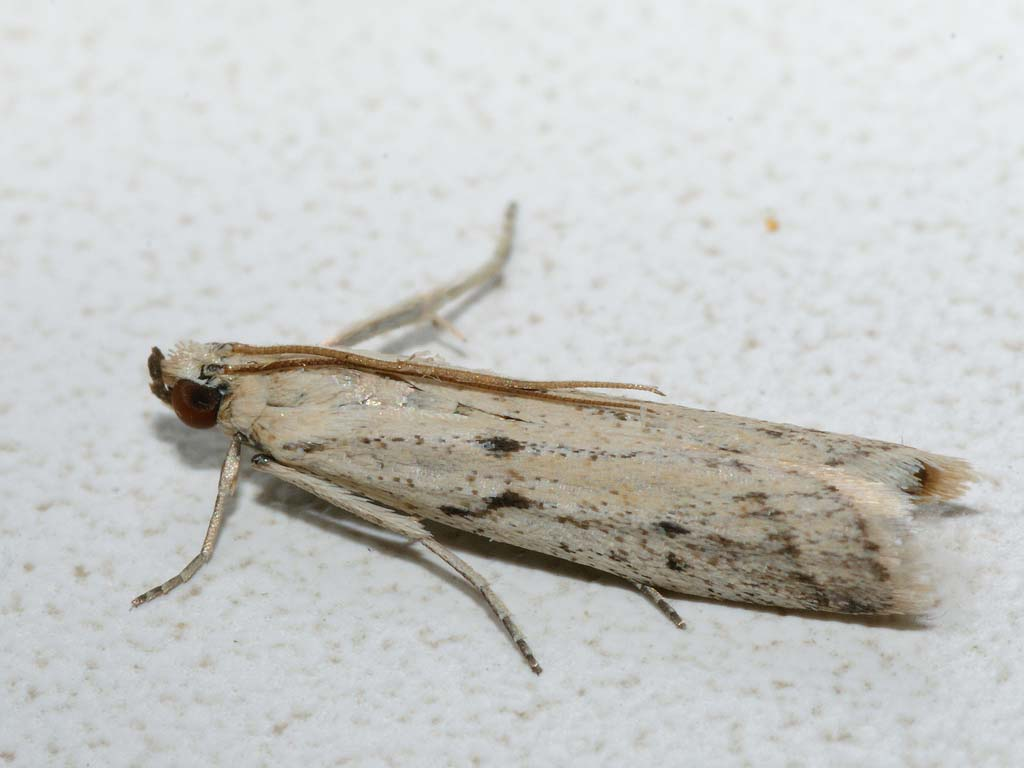

Scientific classification
- Kingdom: Animalia
- Phylum: Arthropoda
- Clade: Pancrustacea
- Class: Insecta
- Order: Lepidoptera
- Family: Pyralidae
- Genus: Homoeosoma
- Species: H. calcella

Binomial name
- Homoeosoma calcella Ragonot, 1887

= Homoeosoma calcella =

Species of moth

Homoeosoma calcella is a species of snout moth in the genus Homoeosoma. It was described by Ragonot in 1887. It is found in Russia and Bulgaria.

The wingspan is about 24 mm.
