= Homoeosoma stenotea =

Scientific classification
- Kingdom: Animalia
- Phylum: Arthropoda
- Clade: Pancrustacea
- Class: Insecta
- Order: Lepidoptera
- Family: Pyralidae
- Genus: Homoeosoma
- Species: H. stenotea

Binomial name
- Homoeosoma stenotea Hampson, 1926

Synonyms
- Homoeosoma stenoteum

Species of moth

Homoeosoma stenotea is a species of snout moth in the genus Homoeosoma. It was described by George Hampson in 1926. It is found in Zimbabwe, Madagascar, Mozambique, Lesotho and South Africa as well as from the Canary Islands and Morocco.
