= Homoeosoma gravosellum =

Scientific classification
- Kingdom: Animalia
- Phylum: Arthropoda
- Clade: Pancrustacea
- Class: Insecta
- Order: Lepidoptera
- Family: Pyralidae
- Genus: Homoeosoma
- Species: H. gravosellum

Binomial name
- Homoeosoma gravosellum Roesler, 1965

Species of moth

Homoeosoma gravosellum is a species of snout moth in the genus Homoeosoma. It was described by Roesler in 1965, and is known from Croatia and Romania.
