= Homoeosoma straminea =

Scientific classification
- Kingdom: Animalia
- Phylum: Arthropoda
- Clade: Pancrustacea
- Class: Insecta
- Order: Lepidoptera
- Family: Pyralidae
- Genus: Homoeosoma
- Species: H. straminea

Binomial name
- Homoeosoma straminea Rothschild, 1921

Synonyms
- Homoeosoma straminella Rothschild, 1921

Species of moth

Homoeosoma straminea is a species of snout moth in the genus Homoeosoma. It was described by Walter Rothschild in 1921. It is found in Niger.
