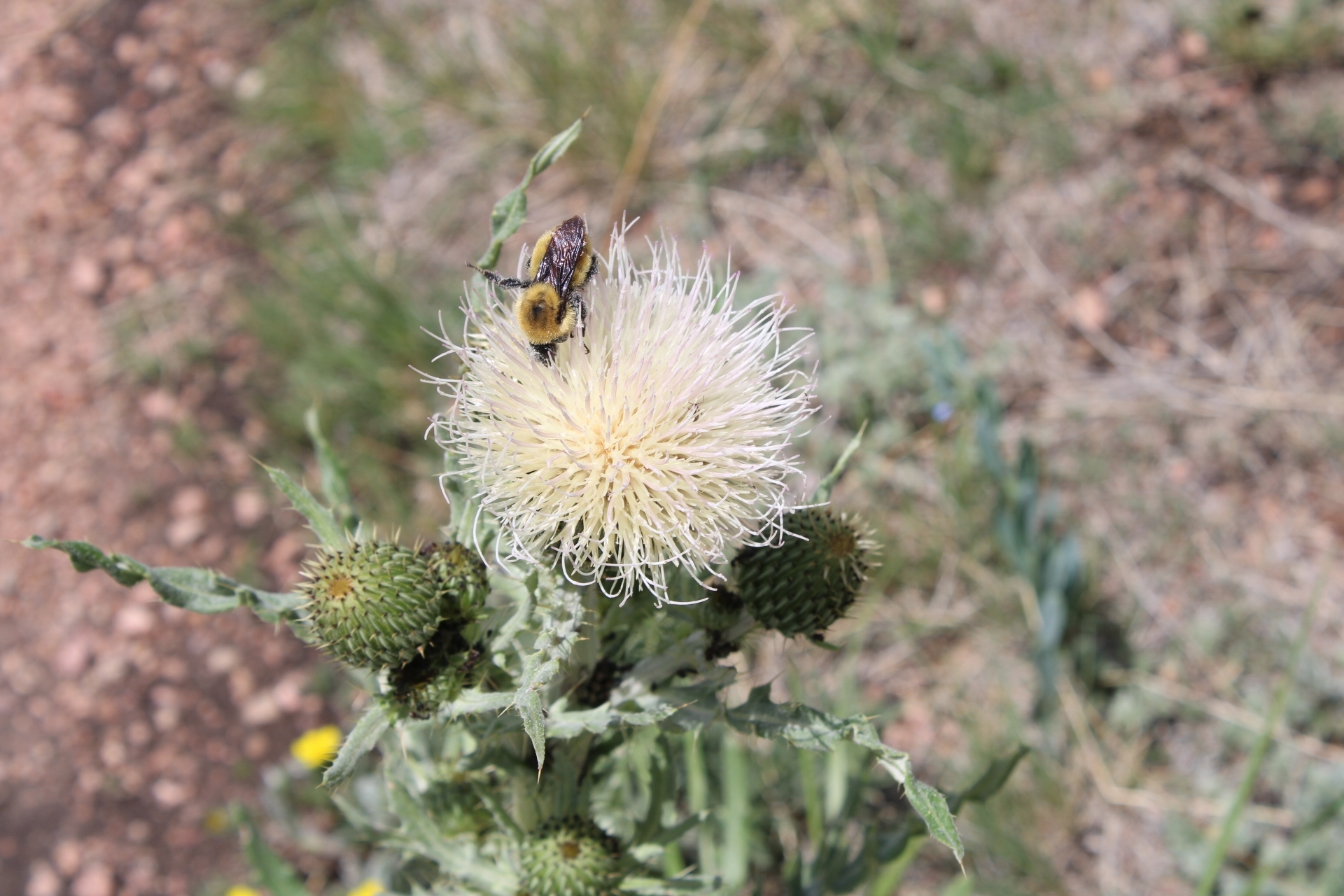
- Prairie thistle with Bombus fervidus

Scientific classification
- Kingdom: Plantae
- Clade: Tracheophytes
- Clade: Angiosperms
- Clade: Eudicots
- Clade: Asterids
- Order: Asterales
- Family: Asteraceae
- Genus: Cirsium
- Species: C. canescens

Binomial name
- Cirsium canescens Nutt. (1841)

Synonyms
- Carduus nebraskensis Britton (1898); Carduus nelsonii Pammel (1909); Carduus plattensis Rydb. (1895); Carduus plattensis var. spinosior Rydb. (1895); Carduus undulatus var. canescens (Nutt.) Porter (1894); Cirsium nebraskense Lunell (1912); Cirsium nebraskense var. formidolosum Lunell (1913); Cirsium nelsonii Rydb. (1917); Cirsium plattense (Rydb.) Cockerell ex Daniels (1911); Cnicus canescens Pammel (1901); Cnicus nelsonii Pammel (1901); Cnicus undulatus var. canescens (Nutt.) A.Gray (1874)

= Cirsium canescens =

Species of flowering plant

Cirsium canescens, commonly known as prairie thistle, is a species of flowering plant in the sunflower family, Asteraceae. It is a thistle native to the north-central and western United States, where it grows in Colorado, Missouri, Montana, Nebraska, South Dakota, and Wyoming, and in California and Nevada.
