= Homoeosoma botydella =

Scientific classification
- Kingdom: Animalia
- Phylum: Arthropoda
- Clade: Pancrustacea
- Class: Insecta
- Order: Lepidoptera
- Family: Pyralidae
- Genus: Homoeosoma
- Species: H. botydella

Binomial name
- Homoeosoma botydella Ragonot, 1888

Species of moth

Homoeosoma botydella is a species of snout moth in the genus Homoeosoma. It was described by Ragonot in 1888. It is found in Niger and South Africa.
