= Homoeosoma oxycercus =

Scientific classification
- Kingdom: Animalia
- Phylum: Arthropoda
- Clade: Pancrustacea
- Class: Insecta
- Order: Lepidoptera
- Family: Pyralidae
- Genus: Homoeosoma
- Species: H. oxycercus

Binomial name
- Homoeosoma oxycercus Goodson & Neunzig, 1993

Species of moth

Homoeosoma oxycercus is a species of snout moth in the genus Homoeosoma. It was described by R. L. Goodson and Herbert H. Neunzig in 1993. It is found in North America, including California and Nevada.
