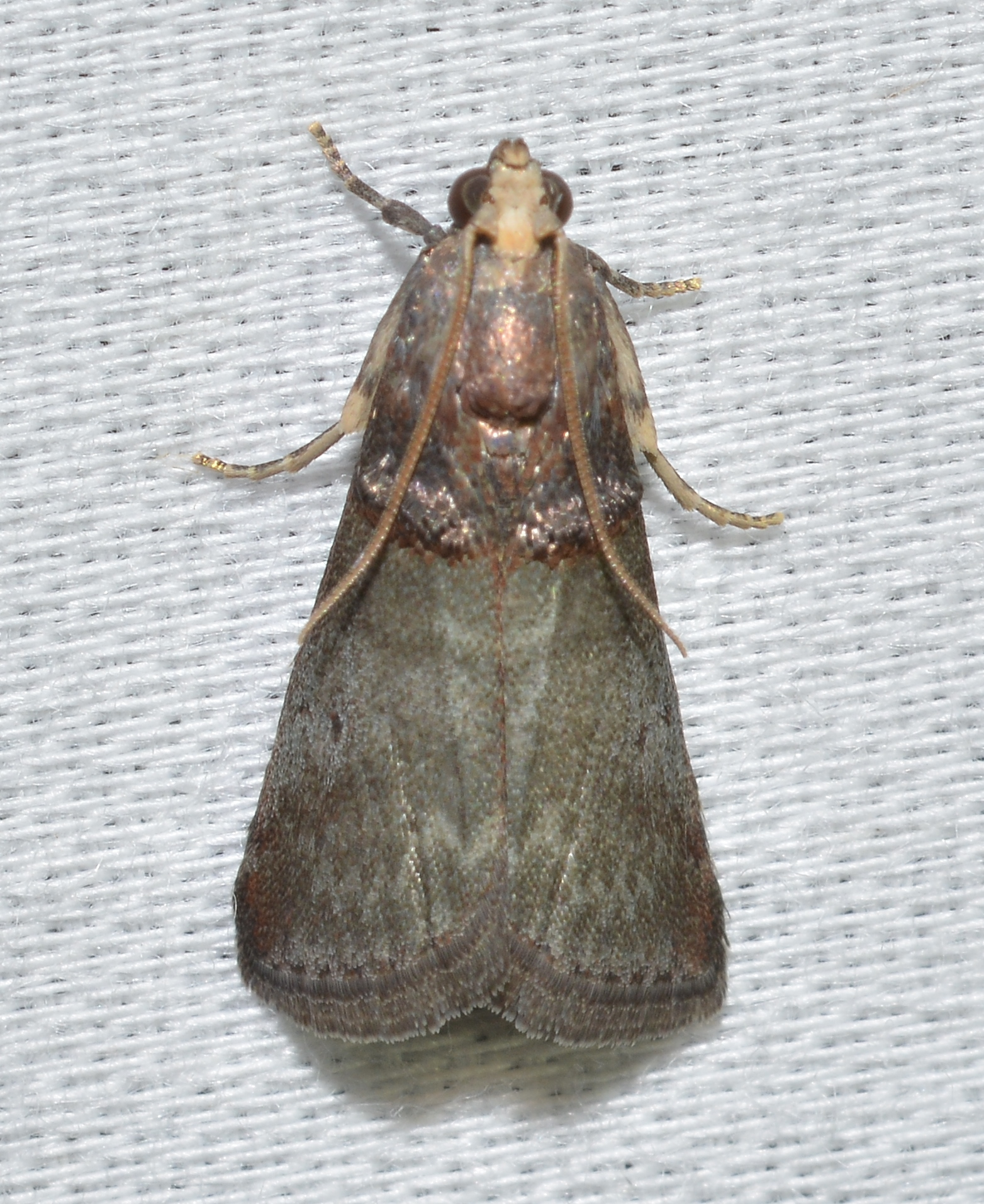

Scientific classification
- Kingdom: Animalia
- Phylum: Arthropoda
- Clade: Pancrustacea
- Class: Insecta
- Order: Lepidoptera
- Family: Pyralidae
- Genus: Acrobasis
- Species: A. stigmella

Binomial name
- Acrobasis stigmella Dyar, 1908

= Acrobasis stigmella =

Species of moth

Acrobasis stigmella is a species of snout moth in the genus Acrobasis. It was described by Harrison Gray Dyar Jr. in 1908, and is known from Ontario, Canada, and the eastern United States.

There is probably only one generation per year.

The larvae feed on Carya species, including Carya tomentosa, Carya glabra and Carya pallida. They generally feed on the buds of their host plant, but may also feed within a shoot for a short period of time. The species overwinters in the larval stage. Pupation takes place in the soil.
