= Patagonia peregrinum =

Scientific classification
- Kingdom: Animalia
- Phylum: Arthropoda
- Clade: Pancrustacea
- Class: Insecta
- Order: Lepidoptera
- Family: Pyralidae
- Genus: Patagonia
- Species: P. peregrinum

Binomial name
- Patagonia peregrinum (Heinrich, 1956)

Synonyms
- Homoeosoma peregrinum Heinrich, 1956

Species of moth

Patagonia peregrinum is a species of snout moth in the genus Patagonia. It was described by Carl Heinrich in 1956. It is found in North America, including Arizona, California and Iowa.

The wingspan is 27 mm.
