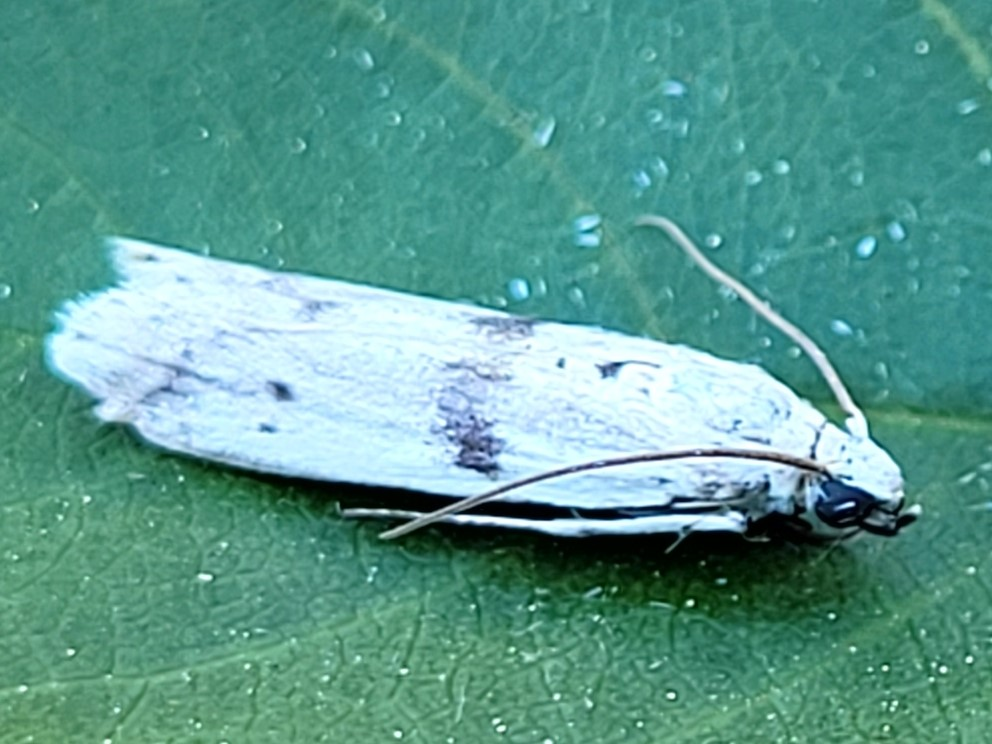

Scientific classification
- Kingdom: Animalia
- Phylum: Arthropoda
- Clade: Pancrustacea
- Class: Insecta
- Order: Lepidoptera
- Family: Pyralidae
- Genus: Homoeosoma
- Species: H. ardaloniphas

Binomial name
- Homoeosoma ardaloniphas Goodson & Neunzig, 1993

= Homoeosoma ardaloniphas =

Species of moth

Homoeosoma ardaloniphas is a species of snout moth in the genus Homoeosoma. It was described by R. L. Goodson and Herbert H. Neunzig in 1993. It is found in North America, including North Dakota.

The wingspan is about 25 mm.
