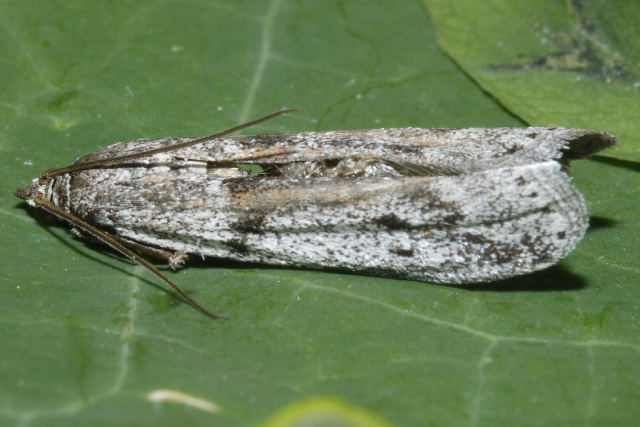

Scientific classification
- Kingdom: Animalia
- Phylum: Arthropoda
- Clade: Pancrustacea
- Class: Insecta
- Order: Lepidoptera
- Family: Pyralidae
- Genus: Homoeosoma
- Species: H. impressale

Binomial name
- Homoeosoma impressale Hulst, 1886

Synonyms
- Homoeosoma impressalis

= Homoeosoma impressale =

Species of moth

Homoeosoma impressale is a species of snout moth in the genus Homoeosoma. It was described by George Duryea Hulst in 1886. It is found in North America, including Arizona and California.

The larvae feed on seeds and seed coats within the flower heads of various Cirsium species (including Cirsium canescens and Cirsium occidentale) and closely related genera.
