= Homoeosoma nanophasma =

Scientific classification
- Kingdom: Animalia
- Phylum: Arthropoda
- Clade: Pancrustacea
- Class: Insecta
- Order: Lepidoptera
- Family: Pyralidae
- Genus: Homoeosoma
- Species: H. nanophasma

Binomial name
- Homoeosoma nanophasma Neunzig, 1997

Species of moth

Homoeosoma nanophasma is a species of snout moth in the genus Homoeosoma. It was described by Herbert H. Neunzig in 1997. It is found in the US state of Florida.
