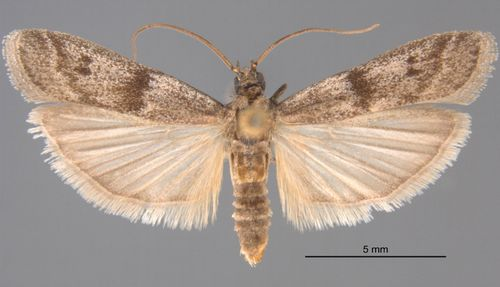

Scientific classification
- Kingdom: Animalia
- Phylum: Arthropoda
- Clade: Pancrustacea
- Class: Insecta
- Order: Lepidoptera
- Family: Pyralidae
- Genus: Homoeosoma
- Species: H. asylonnastes

Binomial name
- Homoeosoma asylonnastes Goodson & Neunzig, 1993

= Homoeosoma asylonnastes =

Species of moth

Homoeosoma asylonnastes is a species of snout moth in the genus Homoeosoma. It was described by R. L. Goodson and Herbert H. Neunzig in 1993. It is found in North America, including Tennessee and West Virginia.
