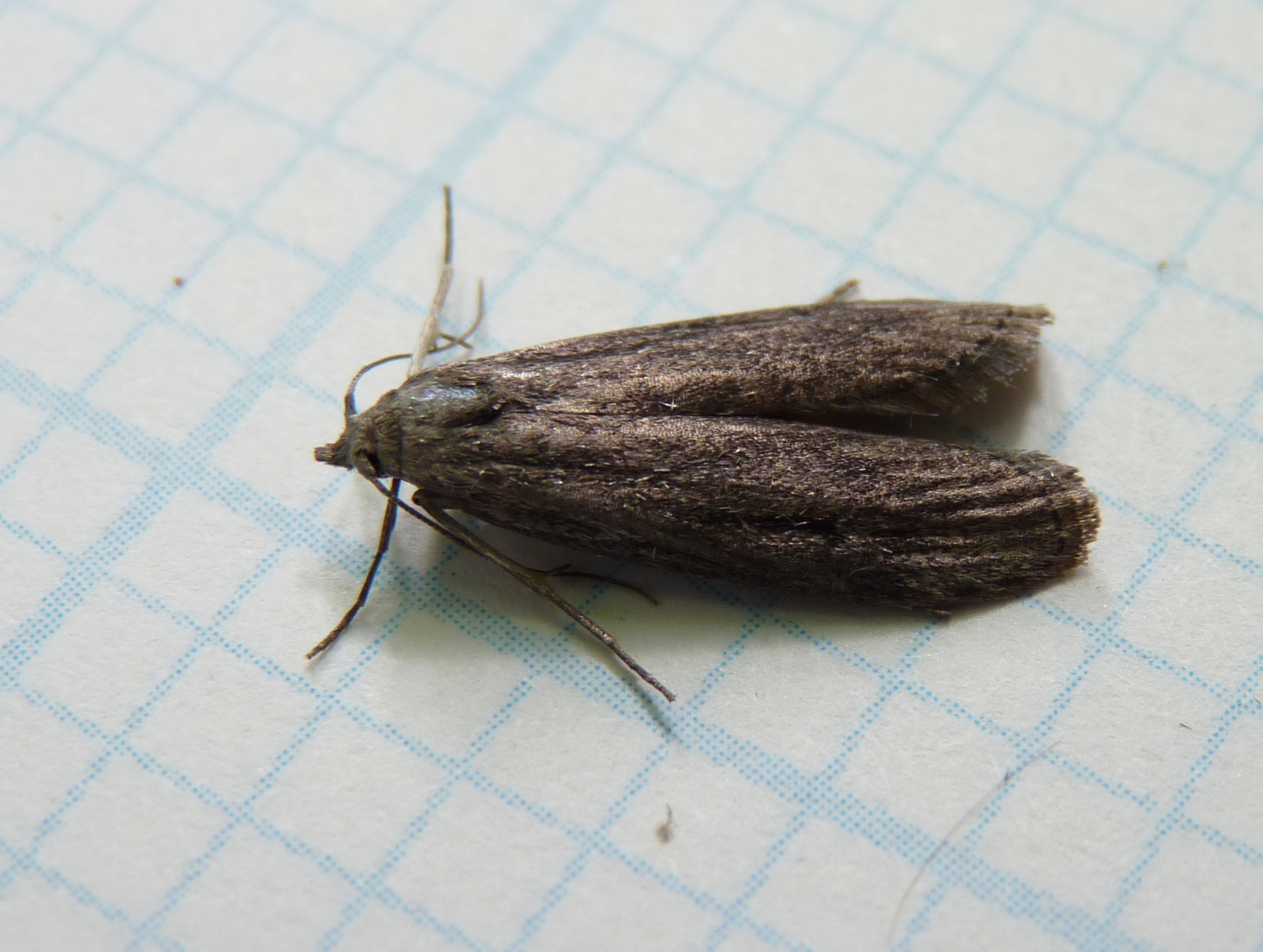

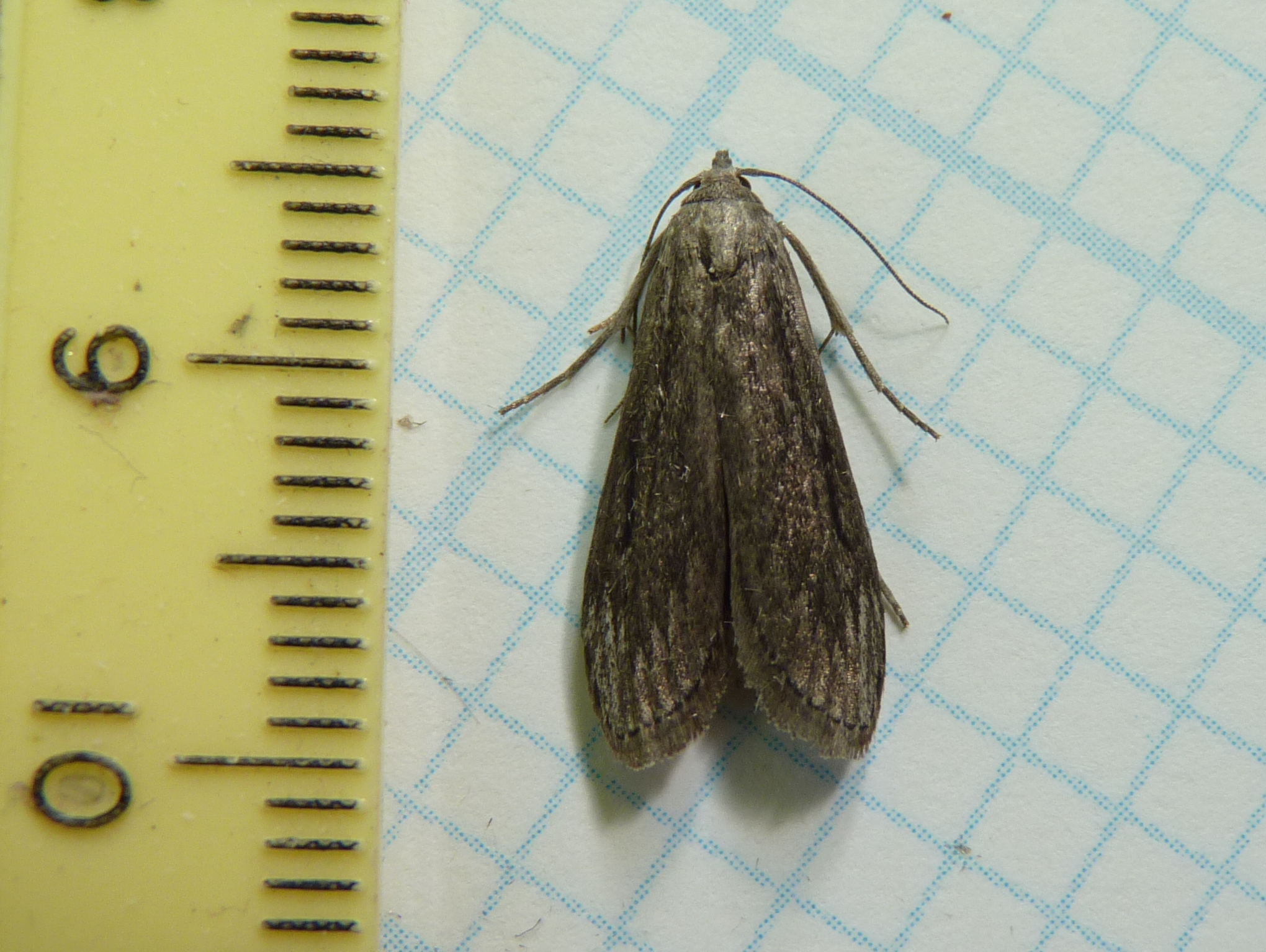

Scientific classification
- Kingdom: Animalia
- Phylum: Arthropoda
- Clade: Pancrustacea
- Class: Insecta
- Order: Lepidoptera
- Family: Pyralidae
- Genus: Aphomia
- Species: A. terrenella

Binomial name
- Aphomia terrenella Zeller, 1848

Synonyms
- Melissoblaptes furellus Zeller, 1873; Aphomia terenella Whalley, 1964; Paralipsa decorella Hulst, 1892

= Aphomia terrenella =

Species of moth

Aphomia terrenella, the terrenella bee moth, is a moth of the family Pyralidae. It is found in North America from Michigan, Ontario, Quebec and New York south to Georgia.

The wingspan is about 25 mm. They are on wing from May to August.

The larvae possibly feed on the honeycomb and/or larvae of bees.
