= Homoeosoma pedionnastes =

Scientific classification
- Kingdom: Animalia
- Phylum: Arthropoda
- Clade: Pancrustacea
- Class: Insecta
- Order: Lepidoptera
- Family: Pyralidae
- Genus: Homoeosoma
- Species: H. pedionnastes

Binomial name
- Homoeosoma pedionnastes Goodson & Neunzig, 1993

Species of moth

Homoeosoma pedionnastes is a species of snout moth in the genus Homoeosoma. It was described by R. L. Goodson and Herbert H. Neunzig in 1993. It is found in North America, including Florida and Maryland.
