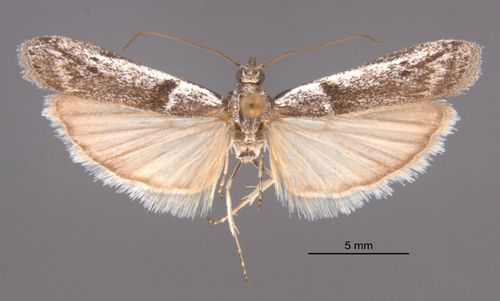

Scientific classification
- Kingdom: Animalia
- Phylum: Arthropoda
- Clade: Pancrustacea
- Class: Insecta
- Order: Lepidoptera
- Family: Pyralidae
- Genus: Homoeosoma
- Species: H. albescentellum

Binomial name
- Homoeosoma albescentellum Ragonot, 1887

Synonyms
- Homoeosoma elongellum Dyar, 1903; Homoeosoma albescentella

= Homoeosoma albescentellum =

Species of moth

Homoeosoma albescentellum is a species of snout moth in the genus Homoeosoma. It was described by Émile Louis Ragonot in 1887. It is found in western North America, including California, Nevada and Washington.
