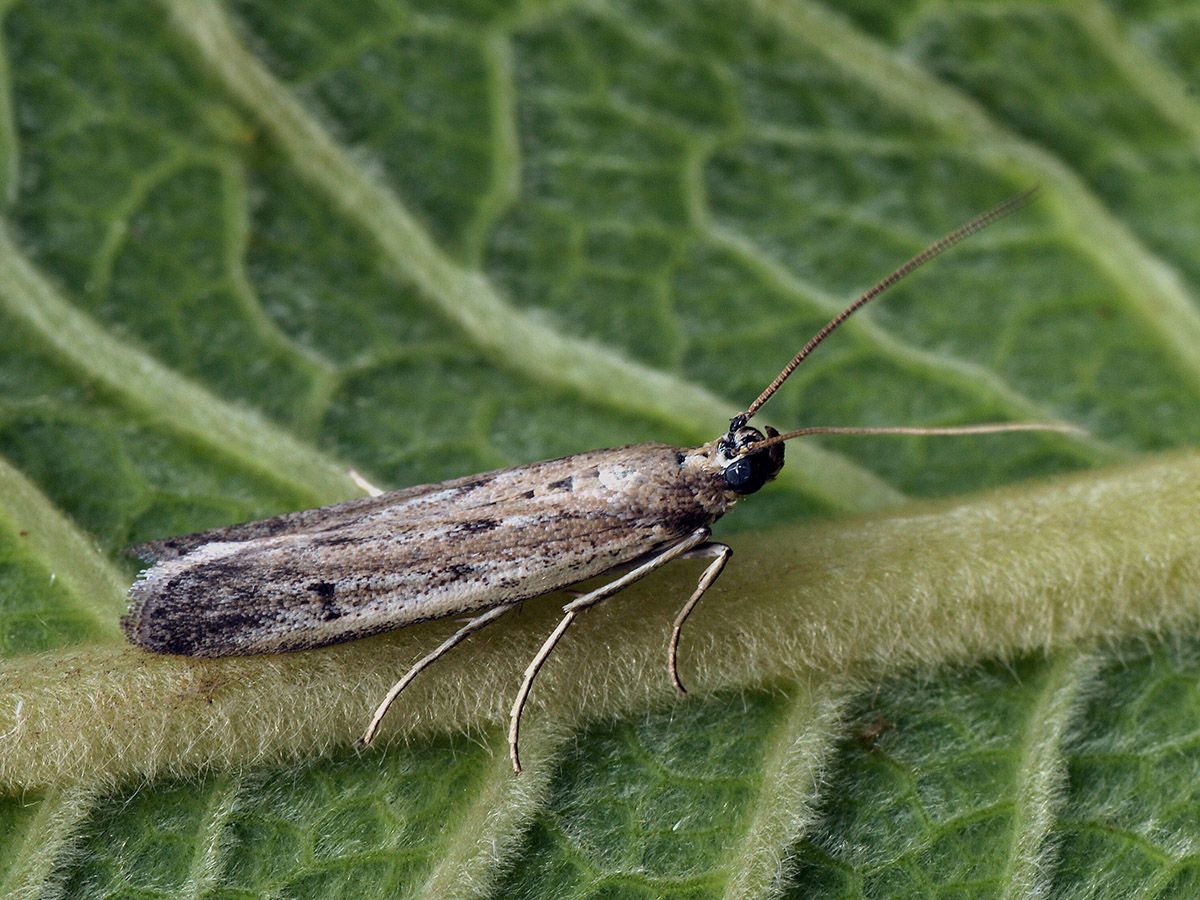
- Homoeosoma nebulella Moscow oblast

Scientific classification
- Kingdom: Animalia
- Phylum: Arthropoda
- Clade: Pancrustacea
- Class: Insecta
- Order: Lepidoptera
- Family: Pyralidae
- Genus: Homoeosoma
- Species: H. nebulella

Binomial name
- Homoeosoma nebulella Denis & Schiffermüller, 1775

= Homoeosoma nebulella =

Eurasian sunflower moth

Species of moth

Homoeosoma nebulella, the Eurasian sunflower moth, is a moth of the family Pyralidae. It is found in Europe, Russia, Anatolia, the Middle East and West Africa. The wingspan is 20–27 mm.The forewings are pale whitish ochreous, tinged with grey and sprinkled with dark grey, towards costa suffused with whitish; first line indicated by two blackish dots, upper more remote from base; second faintly darker-edged, usually preceded by a dark fuscous subdorsal dot; two blackish transversely placed discal dots. The hindwings are subhyaline, fuscous-tinged, the veins and termen fuscous. Larva dull greenish-yellow dorsal and broader subdorsal lines dull purple; spiracular interrupted, double, dull purple; head brown: in flower-heads of Carduus

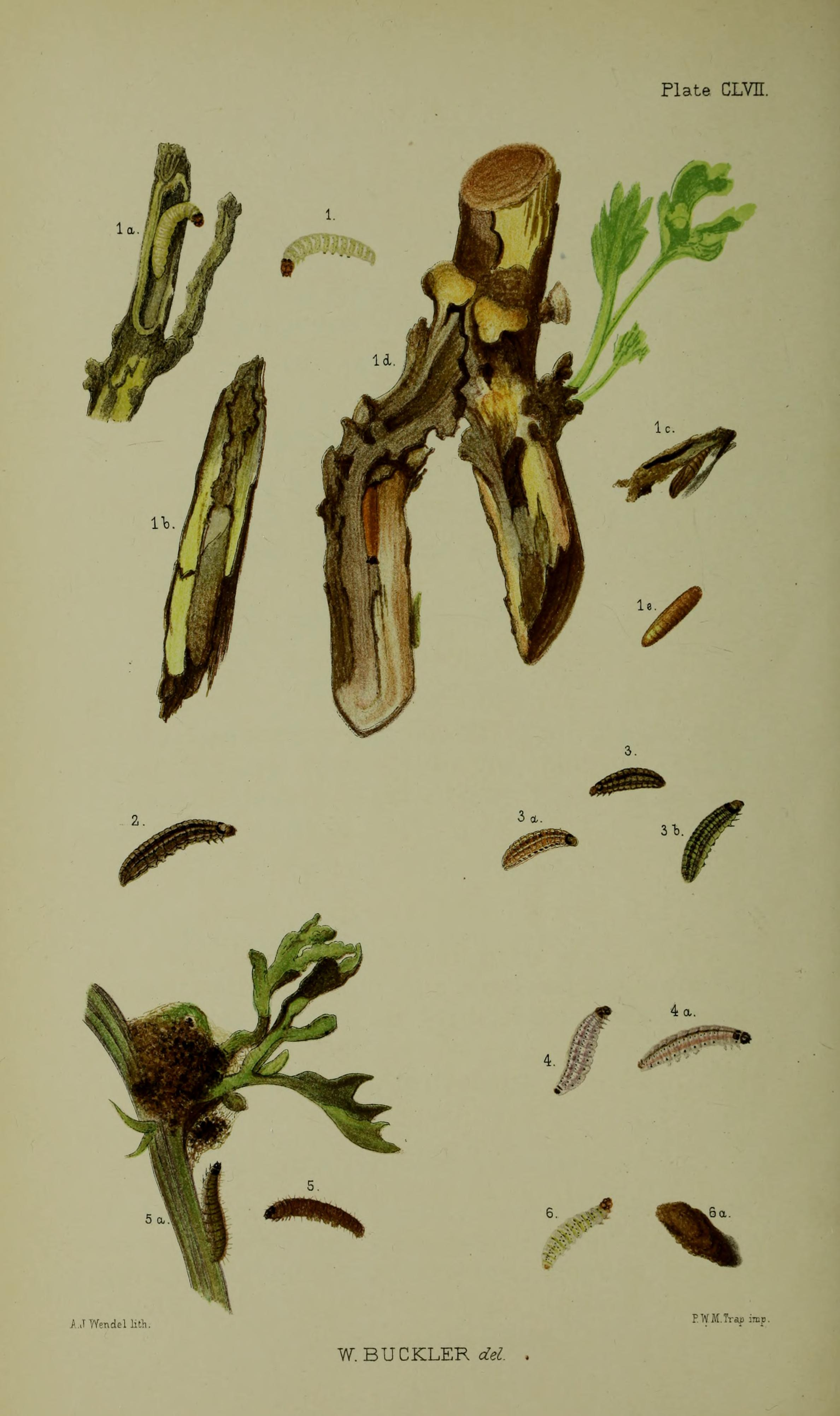
Fig. 2 larva after final moult

The larvae feed on Asteraceae such as Cirsium vulgare, Senecio jacobaea, Tanacetum vulgare and Leucanthemum vulgare. They are a serious pest of the sunflower, Helianthus annuus, in eastern Europe and Ukraine and a potential sunflower pest in France. The caterpillar is grey with a yellow-brown head and three longitudinal stripes on the dorsal side.
