= Homoeosoma ammonastes =

Scientific classification
- Kingdom: Animalia
- Phylum: Arthropoda
- Clade: Pancrustacea
- Class: Insecta
- Order: Lepidoptera
- Family: Pyralidae
- Genus: Homoeosoma
- Species: H. ammonastes

Binomial name
- Homoeosoma ammonastes Goodson & Neunzig, 1993

Species of moth

Homoeosoma ammonastes is a species of snout moth in the genus Homoeosoma. It was described by R. L. Goodson and Herbert H. Neunzig in 1993. It is found in North America, including North Carolina.
