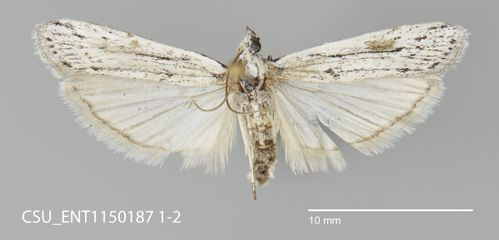

Scientific classification
- Kingdom: Animalia
- Phylum: Arthropoda
- Clade: Pancrustacea
- Class: Insecta
- Order: Lepidoptera
- Family: Pyralidae
- Genus: Homoeosoma
- Species: H. striatellum

Binomial name
- Homoeosoma striatellum Dyar, 1905

Synonyms
- Homoeosoma imitator Heinrich, 1956

= Homoeosoma striatellum =

Species of moth

Homoeosoma striatellum is a species of snout moth in the genus Homoeosoma. It was described by Harrison Gray Dyar Jr. in 1905. It is found in North America, including Arizona, California and Nevada.

The wingspan is 18–22 mm. The forewings are pale gray and the veins are all lined with black. The ground color is dusted with blackish. The hindwings are whitish and ashen at the margin.
