= Homoeosoma asbenicola =

Scientific classification
- Kingdom: Animalia
- Phylum: Arthropoda
- Clade: Pancrustacea
- Class: Insecta
- Order: Lepidoptera
- Family: Pyralidae
- Genus: Homoeosoma
- Species: H. asbenicola

Binomial name
- Homoeosoma asbenicola Rothschild, 1921

Species of moth

Homoeosoma asbenicola is a species of snout moth in the genus Homoeosoma. It was described by Rothschild in 1921. It is found in Niger.
