= Arispe cestalis =

Scientific classification
- Domain: Eukaryota
- Kingdom: Animalia
- Phylum: Arthropoda
- Class: Insecta
- Order: Lepidoptera
- Family: Pyralidae
- Genus: Arispe
- Species: A. cestalis

Binomial name
- Arispe cestalis (Hulst, 1886)

Synonyms
- Anerastia cestalis Hulst, 1886; Uscodys atalis Dyar, 1908; Arispe atalis

Species of mouth

Arispe cestalis is a species of snout moth. It is found in North America, including Colorado and California.
