= Homoeosoma inornatellum =

Scientific classification
- Kingdom: Animalia
- Phylum: Arthropoda
- Clade: Pancrustacea
- Class: Insecta
- Order: Lepidoptera
- Family: Pyralidae
- Genus: Homoeosoma
- Species: H. inornatellum

Binomial name
- Homoeosoma inornatellum (Hulst, 1900)

Synonyms
- Euzophera inornatella Hulst, 1900; Homoeosoma inornatella

Species of moth

Homoeosoma inornatellum is a species of snout moth in the genus Homoeosoma. It was described by George Duryea Hulst in 1900. It is found in North America, including New Jersey and Pennsylvania.
