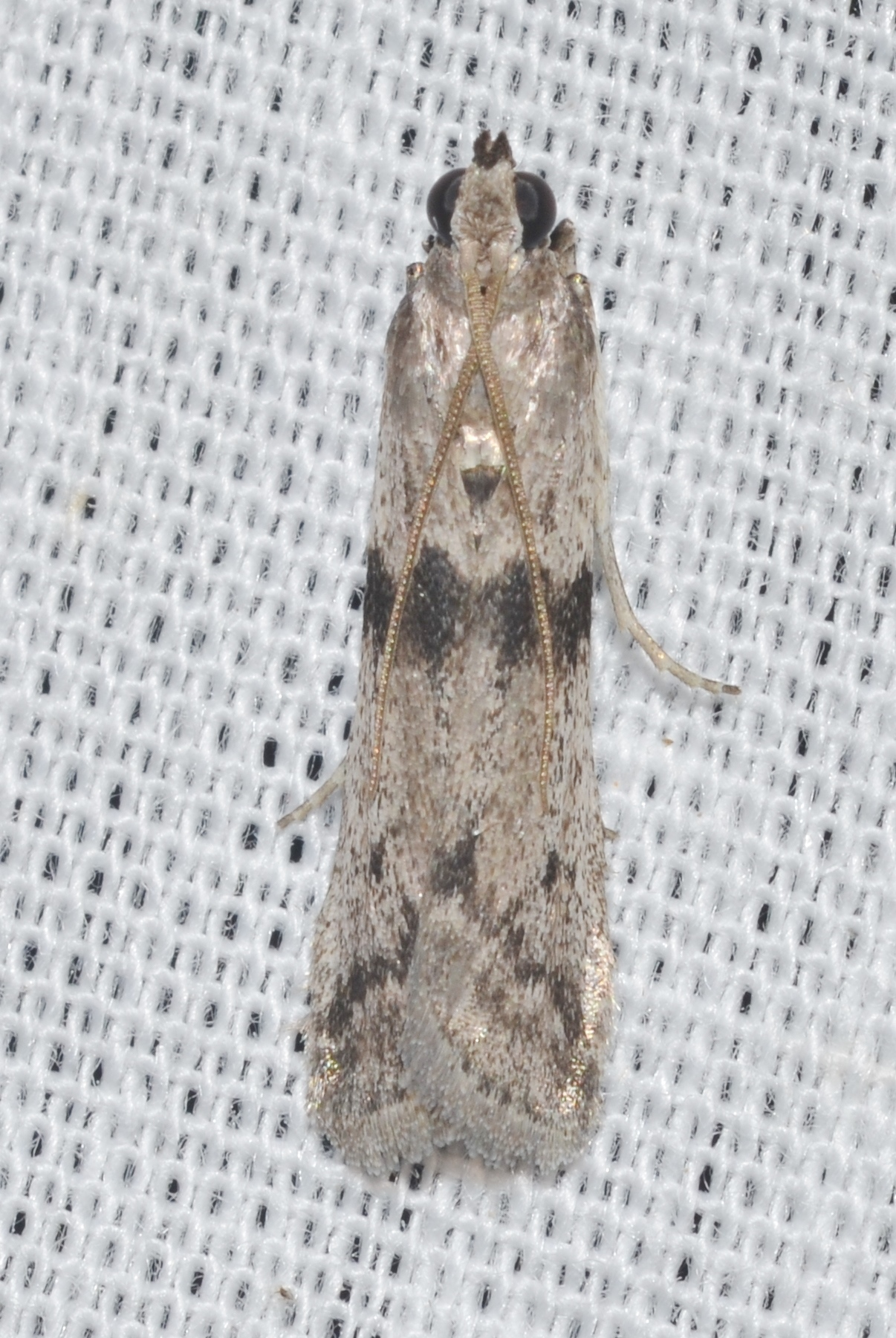

Scientific classification
- Kingdom: Animalia
- Phylum: Arthropoda
- Clade: Pancrustacea
- Class: Insecta
- Order: Lepidoptera
- Family: Pyralidae
- Genus: Homoeosoma
- Species: H. deceptorium

Binomial name
- Homoeosoma deceptorium Heinrich, 1956

= Homoeosoma deceptorium =

Species of moth

Homoeosoma deceptorium is a species of snout moth in the genus Homoeosoma. It was described by Carl Heinrich in 1956. It is found in much of eastern North America, including Florida, Georgia, Illinois, Indiana, Maryland, North Carolina, Ohio, Oklahoma, Ontario and West Virginia.
