= Homoeosoma parvalbum =

Scientific classification
- Kingdom: Animalia
- Phylum: Arthropoda
- Clade: Pancrustacea
- Class: Insecta
- Order: Lepidoptera
- Family: Pyralidae
- Genus: Homoeosoma
- Species: H. parvalbum

Binomial name
- Homoeosoma parvalbum Blanchard & Knudson, 1985

Species of moth

Homoeosoma parvalbum is a species of snout moth in the genus Homoeosoma. It was described by André Blanchard and Ed Knudson in 1985. It is found in Texas, United States.
