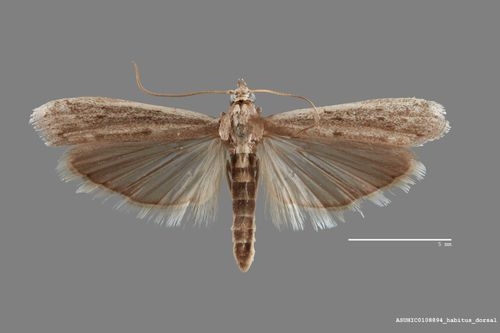

Scientific classification
- Kingdom: Animalia
- Phylum: Arthropoda
- Clade: Pancrustacea
- Class: Insecta
- Order: Lepidoptera
- Family: Pyralidae
- Genus: Homoeosoma
- Species: H. oslarellum

Binomial name
- Homoeosoma oslarellum Dyar, 1905

Synonyms
- Homoeosoma oslarellum breviplicitum Heinrich, 1956

= Homoeosoma oslarellum =

Species of moth

Homoeosoma oslarellum is a species of snout moth in the genus Homoeosoma. It was described by Harrison Gray Dyar Jr. in 1905. It is found in California, United States.
