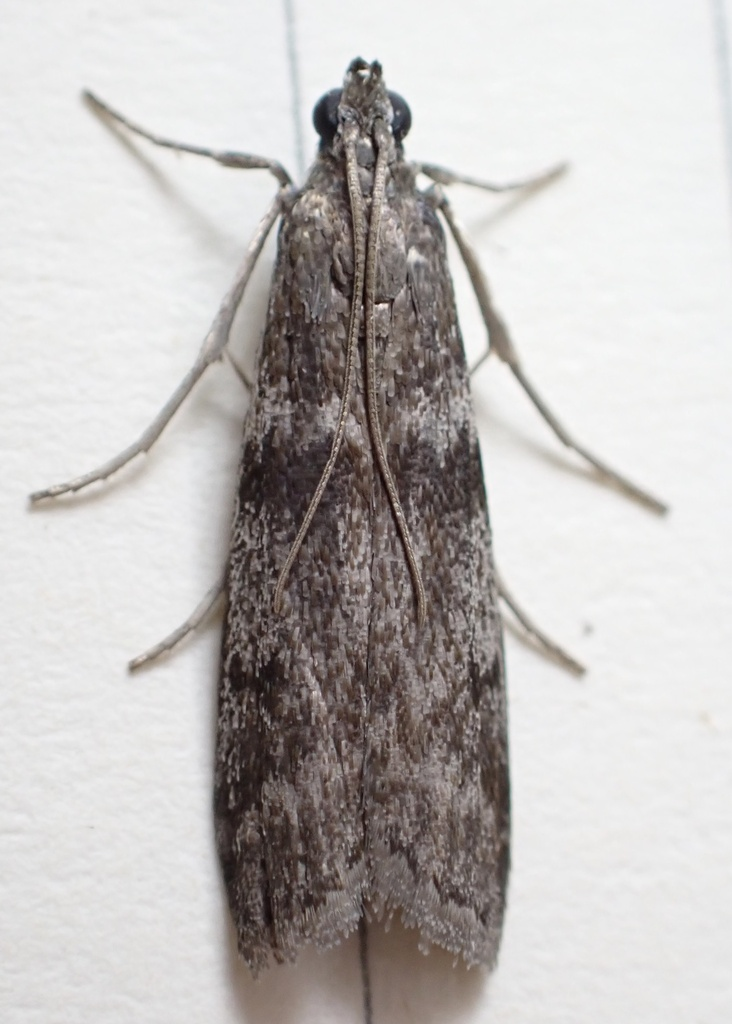

Scientific classification
- Kingdom: Animalia
- Phylum: Arthropoda
- Clade: Pancrustacea
- Class: Insecta
- Order: Lepidoptera
- Family: Pyralidae
- Genus: Homoeosoma
- Species: H. stypticellum

Binomial name
- Homoeosoma stypticellum Grote, 1878

Synonyms
- Homoeosoma stypticella

= Homoeosoma stypticellum =

Species of moth

Homoeosoma stypticellum is a species of snout moth in the genus Homoeosoma. It was described by Augustus Radcliffe Grote in 1878. It is found in North America, including Alberta, Illinois, Massachusetts, Minnesota, North Carolina, Oklahoma, South Carolina, Tennessee, Washington and West Virginia.
