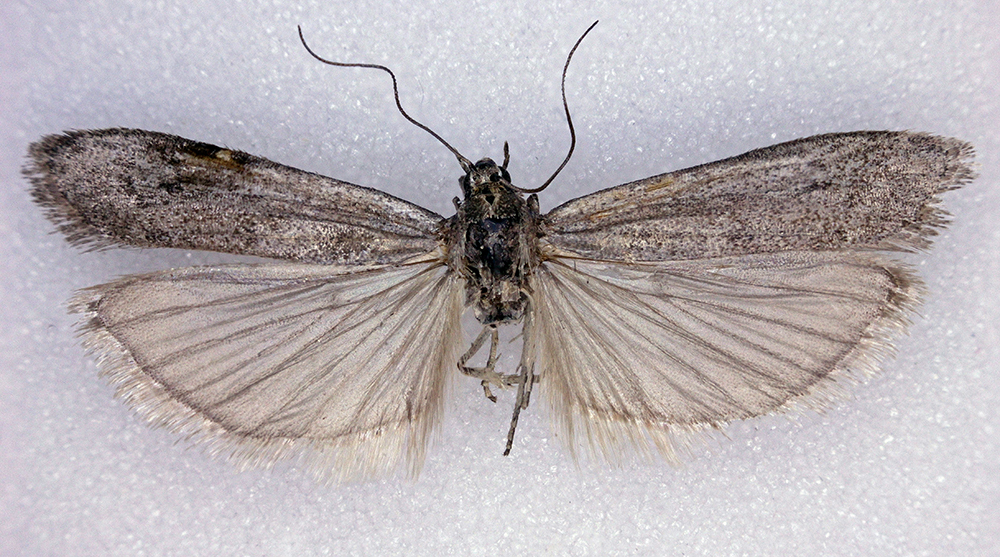

Scientific classification
- Kingdom: Animalia
- Phylum: Arthropoda
- Clade: Pancrustacea
- Class: Insecta
- Order: Lepidoptera
- Family: Pyralidae
- Genus: Homoeosoma
- Species: H. phaeoboreas

Binomial name
- Homoeosoma phaeoboreas Goodson & Neunzig, 1993

= Homoeosoma phaeoboreas =

Species of moth

Homoeosoma phaeoboreas is a species of snout moth in the genus Homoeosoma. It was described by R. L. Goodson and Herbert H. Neunzig in 1993. It is found in the western U.S. state of Washington.
