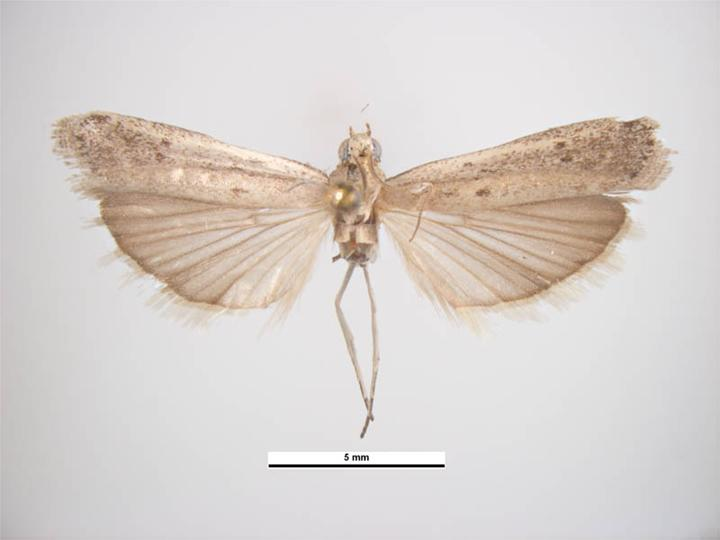

Scientific classification
- Kingdom: Animalia
- Phylum: Arthropoda
- Clade: Pancrustacea
- Class: Insecta
- Order: Lepidoptera
- Family: Pyralidae
- Genus: Homoeosoma
- Species: H. electellum

Binomial name
- Homoeosoma electellum (Hulst, 1887)

Synonyms
- Anerastia electellum Hulst, 1887; Homoeosoma electella; Homoeosoma differellum Barnes & McDunnough, 1913; Homoeosoma opalescellum (Hulst, 1887); Homoeosoma tenuipunctellum Ragonot, 1887; Homoeosoma texanellum Ragonot, 1887

= Homoeosoma electellum =

American sunflower moth

Species of moth

Homoeosoma electellum, the American sunflower moth, is a species of moth of the family Pyralidae. It is native to North America but also found in South America. Its larvae eat the flowers and developing seeds of many asters, including echinacea.

The wingspan is 18–20 mm.

The larvae are a pest of canola and sunflowers. Other recorded food plants include cotton and oranges.
