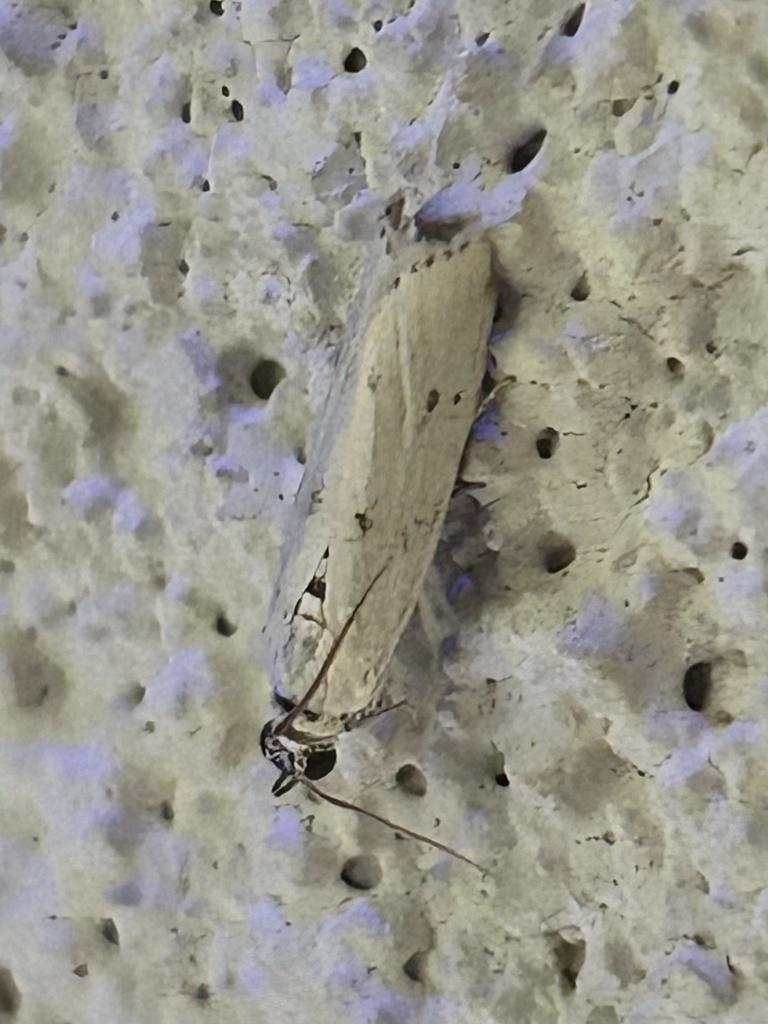

Scientific classification
- Kingdom: Animalia
- Phylum: Arthropoda
- Clade: Pancrustacea
- Class: Insecta
- Order: Lepidoptera
- Family: Pyralidae
- Genus: Homoeosoma
- Species: H. illuviellum

Binomial name
- Homoeosoma illuviellum Ragonot, 1888

Synonyms
- Homoeosoma illuviella; Homoeosoma candidellum Hulst, 1888; Homoeosoma illuviellum emendator Heinrich, 1956

= Homoeosoma illuviellum =

Species of moth

Homoeosoma illuviellum is a species of snout moth in the genus Homoeosoma. It was described by Ragonot in 1888. It is found in North America, including Alberta, New Mexico and Oklahoma.

The wingspan is about 28 mm.
