= Rupela gaia =

Scientific classification
- Domain: Eukaryota
- Kingdom: Animalia
- Phylum: Arthropoda
- Class: Insecta
- Order: Lepidoptera
- Family: Crambidae
- Genus: Rupela
- Species: R. gaia

Binomial name
- Rupela gaia Heinrich, 1937

Species of moth

Rupela gaia is a moth in the family Crambidae. It was described by Carl Heinrich in 1937. It is found in Brazil (Paraná), Argentina and Paraguay.

The wingspan is 39–48 mm. The wings are white.
