= Rupela procula =

Scientific classification
- Domain: Eukaryota
- Kingdom: Animalia
- Phylum: Arthropoda
- Class: Insecta
- Order: Lepidoptera
- Family: Crambidae
- Genus: Rupela
- Species: R. procula

Binomial name
- Rupela procula Heinrich, 1937

Species of moth

Rupela procula is a moth in the family Crambidae. It was described by Carl Heinrich in 1937. It is found in Santa Catarina in Brazil and in Peru.

The wingspan is 50–51 mm. The wings are white.
