= Rupela horridula =

Scientific classification
- Domain: Eukaryota
- Kingdom: Animalia
- Phylum: Arthropoda
- Class: Insecta
- Order: Lepidoptera
- Family: Crambidae
- Genus: Rupela
- Species: R. horridula

Binomial name
- Rupela horridula Heinrich, 1937

Species of moth

Rupela horridula is a moth in the family Crambidae. It was described by Carl Heinrich in 1937. It is found in Brazil (Rio de Janeiro), the Guianas and Trinidad.

The wingspan is 22–32 mm. The wings are white.
