= Erelieva (moth) =

Scientific classification
- Domain: Eukaryota
- Kingdom: Animalia
- Phylum: Arthropoda
- Class: Insecta
- Order: Lepidoptera
- Family: Pyralidae
- Subfamily: Phycitinae
- Genus: Erelieva; Heinrich, 1956

Genus of moths

Erelieva is a genus of snout moths. It was described by Carl Heinrich in 1956.

== Species ==
- Erelieva coca (Dyar, 1914)
- Erelieva quantulella (Hulst, 1887)
- Erelieva parvulella (Ely, 1910)
