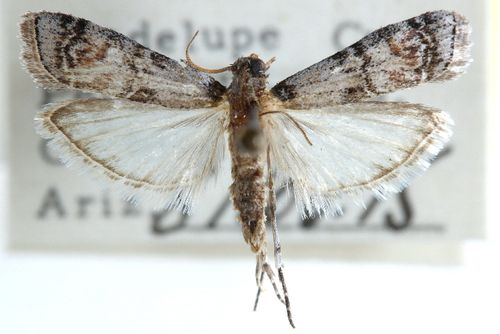

Scientific classification
- Domain: Eukaryota
- Kingdom: Animalia
- Phylum: Arthropoda
- Class: Insecta
- Order: Lepidoptera
- Family: Pyralidae
- Genus: Anadelosemia
- Species: A. condigna

Binomial name
- Anadelosemia condigna Heinrich, 1956

= Anadelosemia condigna =

Species of moth

Anadelosemia condigna is a species of snout moth in the genus Anadelosemia. It was described by Carl Heinrich in 1956. It is found in the south-western United States.
