= Rupela scitula =

Scientific classification
- Domain: Eukaryota
- Kingdom: Animalia
- Phylum: Arthropoda
- Class: Insecta
- Order: Lepidoptera
- Family: Crambidae
- Genus: Rupela
- Species: R. scitula

Binomial name
- Rupela scitula Heinrich, 1937

Species of moth

Rupela scitula is a moth in the family Crambidae. It was described by Carl Heinrich in 1937. It is found in Tucumán Province of Argentina, Brazil and Guyana.

The wingspan is 21–29 mm. The wings are shining white.
