= Rupela sejuncta =

Scientific classification
- Kingdom: Animalia
- Phylum: Arthropoda
- Class: Insecta
- Order: Lepidoptera
- Family: Crambidae
- Genus: Rupela
- Species: R. sejuncta

Binomial name
- Rupela sejuncta Heinrich, 1937

Species of moth

Rupela sejuncta is a moth in the family Crambidae. It was described by Carl Heinrich in 1937. It is found in North America, where it has been recorded from Alabama, Florida, Oklahoma, Texas and I Dyquan Duke found that specimen in Guyana the cocoon of which has a fur like textured if u want photo contact me on +592 671-8326.

The wingspan is 28–33 mm for males and 25–30 mm for females. The wings are shining white. Adults have been recorded on wing from March to July and from September to November.
