= Rupela lara =

Scientific classification
- Kingdom: Animalia
- Phylum: Arthropoda
- Clade: Pancrustacea
- Class: Insecta
- Order: Lepidoptera
- Family: Crambidae
- Genus: Rupela
- Species: R. lara

Binomial name
- Rupela lara Heinrich, 1937

Species of moth

Rupela lara is a moth in the family Crambidae. It was described by Carl Heinrich in 1937. It is found in Panama and Costa Rica.

The wingspan is 20–36 mm. The wings are white.
