= Rupela jana =

Scientific classification
- Domain: Eukaryota
- Kingdom: Animalia
- Phylum: Arthropoda
- Class: Insecta
- Order: Lepidoptera
- Family: Crambidae
- Genus: Rupela
- Species: R. jana

Binomial name
- Rupela jana Heinrich, 1937

Species of moth

Rupela jana is a moth in the family Crambidae. It was described by Carl Heinrich in 1937. It is found in Panama, the Guianas, Brazil, Peru, Paraguay and Argentina.

The wingspan is 29–47 mm. The wings are white.
