= Chararica =

Scientific classification
- Domain: Eukaryota
- Kingdom: Animalia
- Phylum: Arthropoda
- Class: Insecta
- Order: Lepidoptera
- Family: Pyralidae
- Subfamily: Phycitinae
- Genus: Chararica; Heinrich, 1956

Genus of moths

Chararica is a genus of snout moths. It was described by Carl Heinrich in 1956.

== Species ==
- Chararica annuliferella (Dyar, 1905)
- Chararica bicolorella (Barnes & McDunnough, 1917)
- Chararica circiimperfecta Neunzig, 1996
- Chararica hystriculella (Hulst, 1889)
