= Rupela bendis =

Scientific classification
- Domain: Eukaryota
- Kingdom: Animalia
- Phylum: Arthropoda
- Class: Insecta
- Order: Lepidoptera
- Family: Crambidae
- Genus: Rupela
- Species: R. bendis

Binomial name
- Rupela bendis Heinrich, 1937

Species of moth

Rupela bendis is a moth in the family Crambidae. It was described by Carl Heinrich in 1937. It is found in Venezuela and São Paulo, Brazil.

The wingspan is 28–33 mm. The wings are white.
