= Rupela pallidula =

Scientific classification
- Domain: Eukaryota
- Kingdom: Animalia
- Phylum: Arthropoda
- Class: Insecta
- Order: Lepidoptera
- Family: Crambidae
- Genus: Rupela
- Species: R. pallidula

Binomial name
- Rupela pallidula Heinrich, 1937

Species of moth

Rupela pallidula is a moth in the family Crambidae. It was described by Carl Heinrich in 1937. It is found in the Brazilian states of Paraná and São Paulo.

The wingspan is 24–32 mm. The forewings are silvery buff. The hindwings are greyish to greyish brown.
