= Rupela nereis =

Scientific classification
- Domain: Eukaryota
- Kingdom: Animalia
- Phylum: Arthropoda
- Class: Insecta
- Order: Lepidoptera
- Family: Crambidae
- Genus: Rupela
- Species: R. nereis

Binomial name
- Rupela nereis Heinrich, 1937

Species of moth

Rupela nereis is a moth in the family Crambidae. It was described by Carl Heinrich in 1937. It is found in Paraná, Brazil.

The wingspan is about 40 mm. The wings are white.
