= Rupela maenas =

Scientific classification
- Domain: Eukaryota
- Kingdom: Animalia
- Phylum: Arthropoda
- Class: Insecta
- Order: Lepidoptera
- Family: Crambidae
- Genus: Rupela
- Species: R. maenas

Binomial name
- Rupela maenas Heinrich, 1937

Species of moth

Rupela maenas is a moth in the family Crambidae. It was described by Carl Heinrich in 1937. It is found in the Brazilian state of Paraná and the Guianas.

The wingspan is 22–31 mm. The wings are white.
