= Aptunga =

Scientific classification
- Domain: Eukaryota
- Kingdom: Animalia
- Phylum: Arthropoda
- Class: Insecta
- Order: Lepidoptera
- Family: Pyralidae
- Subfamily: Phycitinae
- Genus: Aptunga; Heinrich, 1956

Genus of moths

Aptunga is a genus of snout moths. It was described by Carl Heinrich in 1956.

== Species ==
- Aptunga culmenicola Neunzig, 1996
- Aptunga macropasa (Dyar, 1919)
- Aptunga setadebilia Neunzig, 1996
- Aptunga vega Neunzig, 1996
