= Anderida (moth) =

Scientific classification
- Domain: Eukaryota
- Kingdom: Animalia
- Phylum: Arthropoda
- Class: Insecta
- Order: Lepidoptera
- Family: Pyralidae
- Subfamily: Phycitinae
- Genus: Anderida; Heinrich, 1956

Genus of moths

Anderida is a genus of snout moths. It was described by Carl Heinrich in 1956.

== Species ==
- Anderida peorinella Blanchard & Knudson, 1985
- Anderida sonorella (Ragonot, 1887)
