= Rupela drusilla =

Scientific classification
- Kingdom: Animalia
- Phylum: Arthropoda
- Clade: Pancrustacea
- Class: Insecta
- Order: Lepidoptera
- Family: Crambidae
- Genus: Rupela
- Species: R. drusilla

Binomial name
- Rupela drusilla Heinrich, 1937

Species of moth

Rupela drusilla is a moth in the family Crambidae. It was described by Carl Heinrich in 1937. It is found in Paraná, Brazil.

The wingspan is about 28 mm. The wings are white.
