= Rupela herie =

Scientific classification
- Domain: Eukaryota
- Kingdom: Animalia
- Phylum: Arthropoda
- Class: Insecta
- Order: Lepidoptera
- Family: Crambidae
- Genus: Rupela
- Species: R. herie

Binomial name
- Rupela herie Heinrich, 1937

Species of moth

Rupela herie is a moth in the family Crambidae. It was described by Carl Heinrich in 1937. It is found in Guyana and Suriname.

The wingspan is 30–33 mm. The wings are white.
