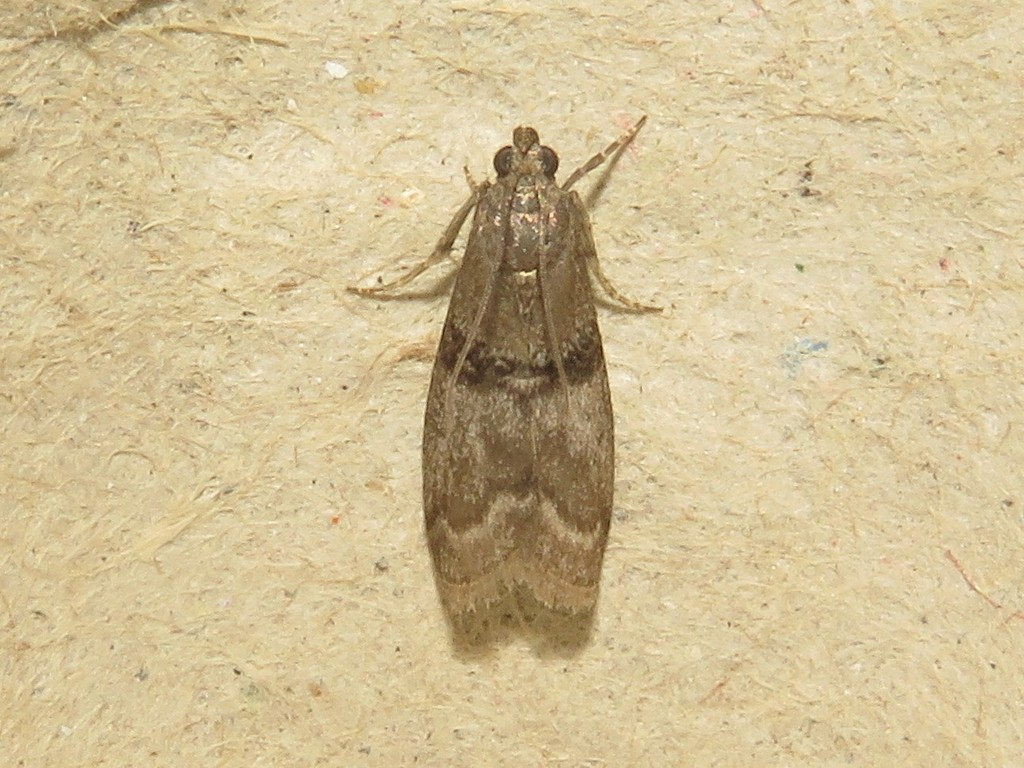

Scientific classification
- Domain: Eukaryota
- Kingdom: Animalia
- Phylum: Arthropoda
- Class: Insecta
- Order: Lepidoptera
- Family: Pyralidae
- Genus: Meroptera
- Species: M. abditiva

Binomial name
- Meroptera abditiva Heinrich, 1956

= Meroptera abditiva =

Species of moth

Meroptera abditiva is a species of snout moth in the genus Meroptera. It was described by Carl Heinrich in 1956, and is known from North America, including Illinois, Maryland, New Brunswick, Ohio and Quebec.
