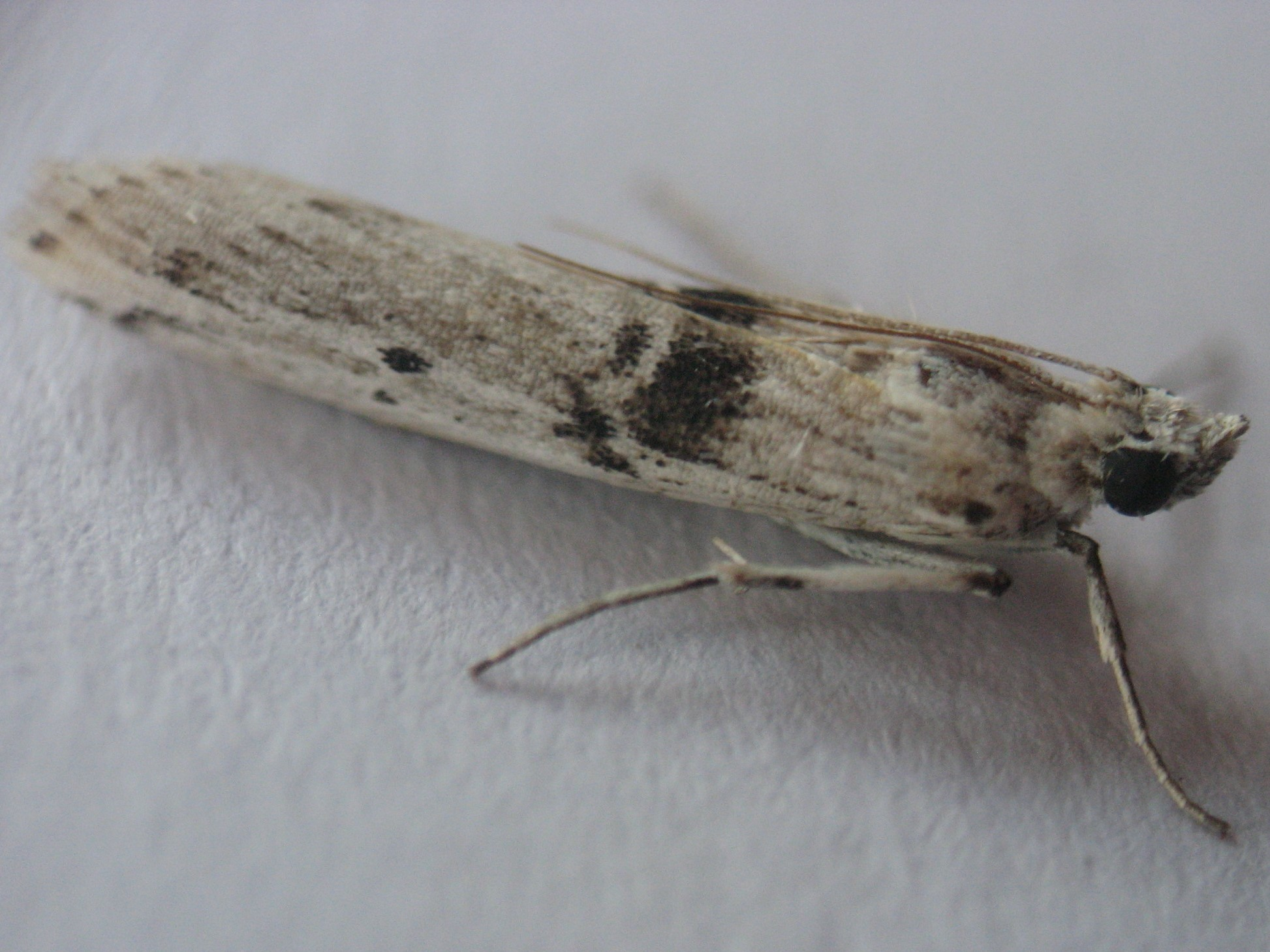
- Interjectio niviella

Scientific classification
- Domain: Eukaryota
- Kingdom: Animalia
- Phylum: Arthropoda
- Class: Insecta
- Order: Lepidoptera
- Family: Pyralidae
- Subfamily: Phycitinae
- Genus: Interjectio; Heinrich, 1956

= Interjectio =

Genus of moths

Interjectio is a genus of snout moths described by Carl Heinrich in 1956.

== Species ==
- Interjectio columbiella (McDunnough, 1935)
- Interjectio denticulella (Ragonot, 1887)
- Interjectio niviella (Hulst, 1888)
