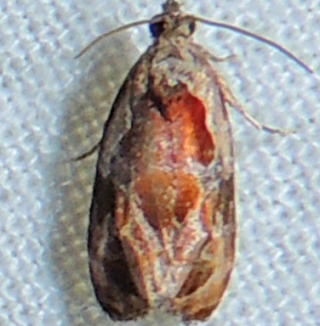
- Zomaria interruptolineana

Scientific classification
- Kingdom: Animalia
- Phylum: Arthropoda
- Class: Insecta
- Order: Lepidoptera
- Family: Tortricidae
- Tribe: Olethreutini
- Genus: Zomaria; Heinrich, 1926

= Zomaria =

Genus of tortrix moths

Zomaria is a genus of moths belonging to the subfamily Olethreutinae of the family Tortricidae.

== Species ==
- Zomaria andromedana (Barnes & McDunnough, 1917)
- Zomaria dystricta Razowski & Becker, 2016
- Zomaria interruptolineana (Fernald, 1882)
- Zomaria rosaochreana (Kearfott, 1907)

== See also ==
- List of Tortricidae genera
