= Rupela antonia =

Scientific classification
- Domain: Eukaryota
- Kingdom: Animalia
- Phylum: Arthropoda
- Class: Insecta
- Order: Lepidoptera
- Family: Crambidae
- Genus: Rupela
- Species: R. antonia

Binomial name
- Rupela antonia Heinrich, 1937

Species of moth

Rupela antonia is a moth in the family Crambidae. It was described by Carl Heinrich in 1937. It is found in Costa Rica.

The wingspan is 38–43 mm. The wings are white.
