= Caristanius =

Scientific classification
- Domain: Eukaryota
- Kingdom: Animalia
- Phylum: Arthropoda
- Class: Insecta
- Order: Lepidoptera
- Family: Pyralidae
- Subfamily: Phycitinae
- Genus: Caristanius; Heinrich, 1956

Genus of moths

Caristanius is a genus of snout moths described by Carl Heinrich in 1956.

== Species ==
- Caristanius decoloralis (Walker, 1863)
- Caristanius guatemalella (Ragonot, 1888)
- Caristanius minimus Neunzig, 1977
- Caristanius pellucidella (Ragonot, 1888)
- Caristanius tripartitus Neunzig, 1996
- Caristanius veracruzensis Neunzig, 2004
