= Olybria =

Scientific classification
- Domain: Eukaryota
- Kingdom: Animalia
- Phylum: Arthropoda
- Class: Insecta
- Order: Lepidoptera
- Family: Pyralidae
- Subfamily: Phycitinae
- Genus: Olybria; Heinrich, 1956

Genus of moths

Olybria is a genus of snout moths erected by Carl Heinrich in 1956.

== Species ==
- Olybria aliculella (Hulst, 1887)
- Olybria furciferella (Dyar, 1904)
