= Rupela segrega =

Scientific classification
- Domain: Eukaryota
- Kingdom: Animalia
- Phylum: Arthropoda
- Class: Insecta
- Order: Lepidoptera
- Family: Crambidae
- Genus: Rupela
- Species: R. segrega

Binomial name
- Rupela segrega Heinrich, 1937

Species of moth

Rupela segrega is a moth in the family Crambidae. It was described by Carl Heinrich in 1937. It is found in North America, where it has been recorded from Florida, Georgia, North Carolina and Maryland.

The wingspan is 26–33 mm for males and 28–38 mm for females. Adults have been recorded on wing from April to July and from September to October
