= Fulrada =

Scientific classification
- Domain: Eukaryota
- Kingdom: Animalia
- Phylum: Arthropoda
- Class: Insecta
- Order: Lepidoptera
- Family: Pyralidae
- Subfamily: Phycitinae
- Genus: Fulrada; Heinrich, 1956

Genus of moths

Fulrada is a genus of snout moths described by Carl Heinrich in 1956.

== Species ==
- Fulrada carpasella (Schaus, 1923)
- Fulrada querna Dyar, 1914
