= Rupela lumaria =

Scientific classification
- Domain: Eukaryota
- Kingdom: Animalia
- Phylum: Arthropoda
- Class: Insecta
- Order: Lepidoptera
- Family: Crambidae
- Genus: Rupela
- Species: R. lumaria

Binomial name
- Rupela lumaria Heinrich, 1937

Species of moth

Rupela lumaria is a moth in the family Crambidae. It was described by Carl Heinrich in 1937. It is found in Costa Rica.

The wingspan is about 30 mm. The wings are white.
