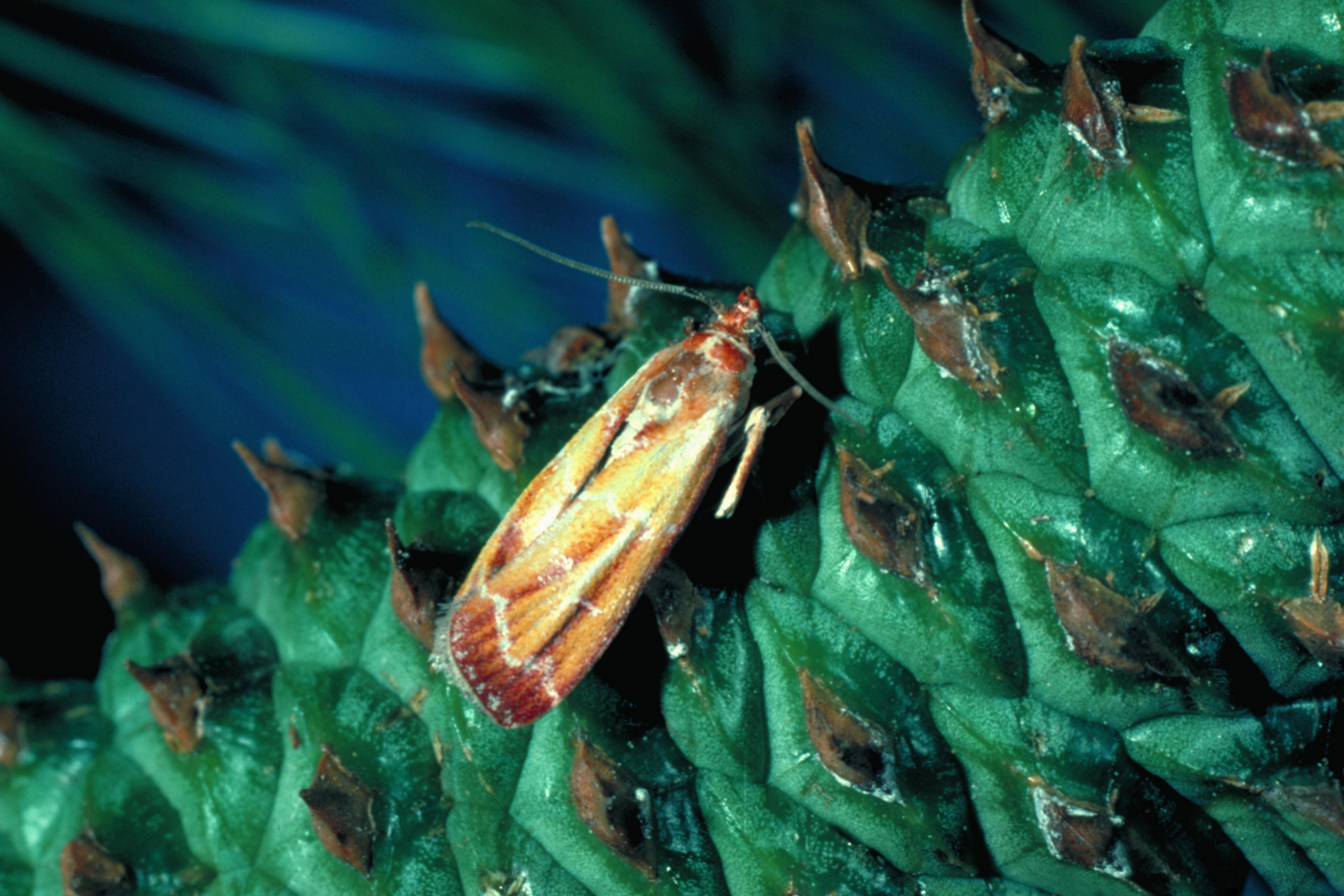

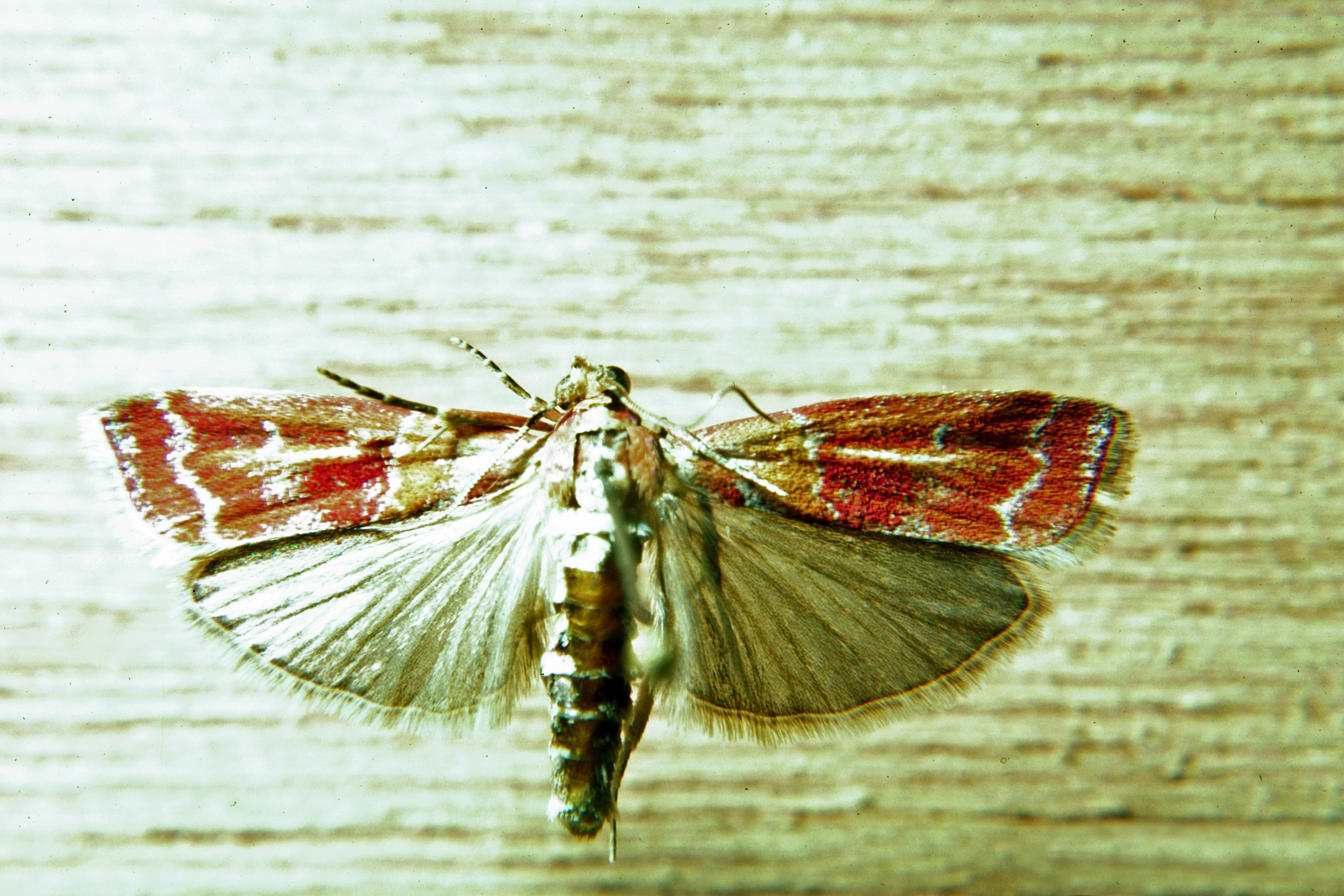

Scientific classification
- Kingdom: Animalia
- Phylum: Arthropoda
- Clade: Pancrustacea
- Class: Insecta
- Order: Lepidoptera
- Family: Pyralidae
- Genus: Dioryctria
- Species: D. disclusa

Binomial name
- Dioryctria disclusa Heinrich, 1953

= Dioryctria disclusa =

Species of moth

Dioryctria disclusa, the webbing coneworm or rusty pine cone moth, is a species of moth of the family Pyralidae. It is found in North America from New Brunswick to Florida, west to Texas and north to Manitoba. The larvae feed on pine cones, including those of loblolly pine (Pinus taeda).

The wingspan is 24–27 mm (0.94–1.06 in).

== Gallery ==
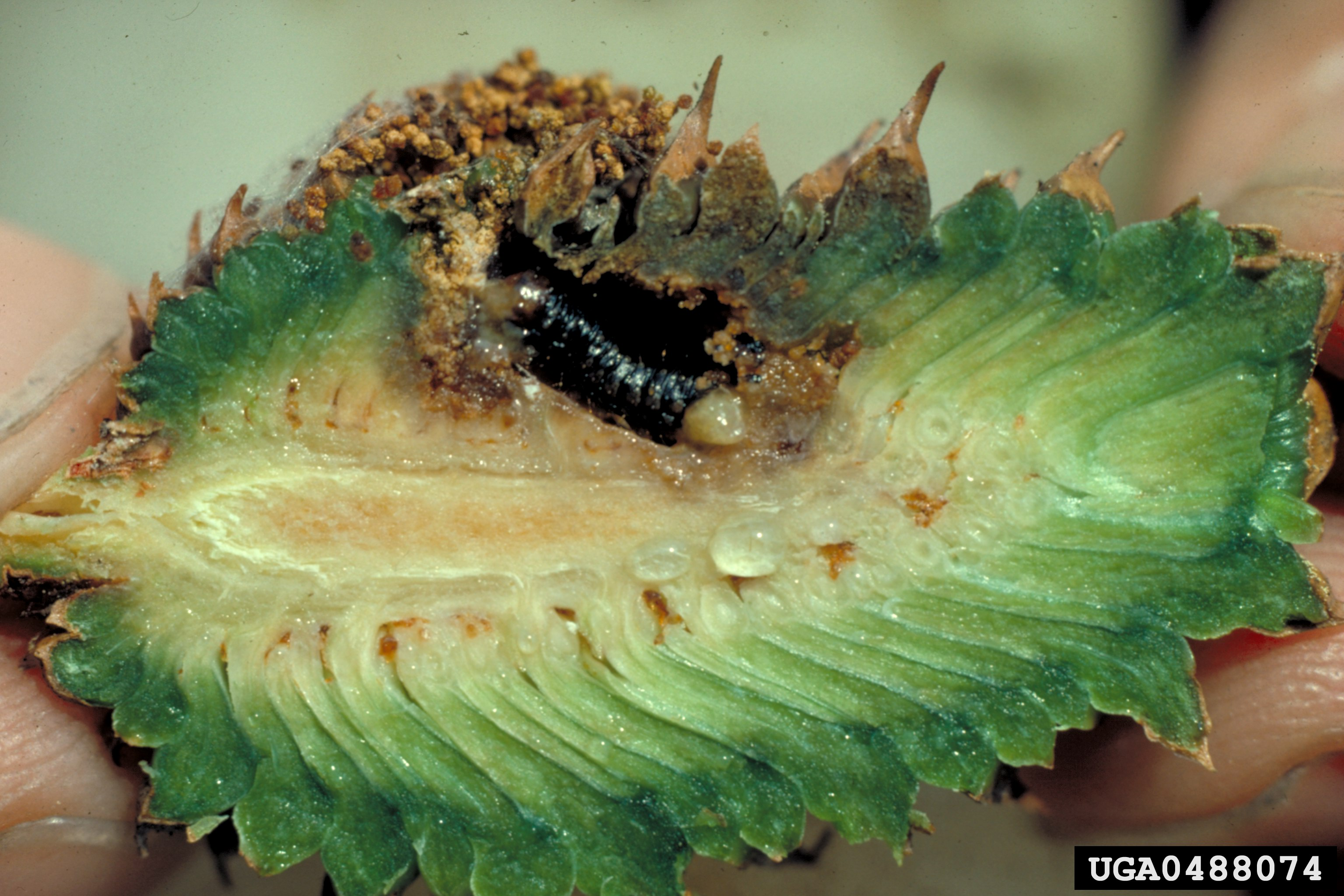
Larva

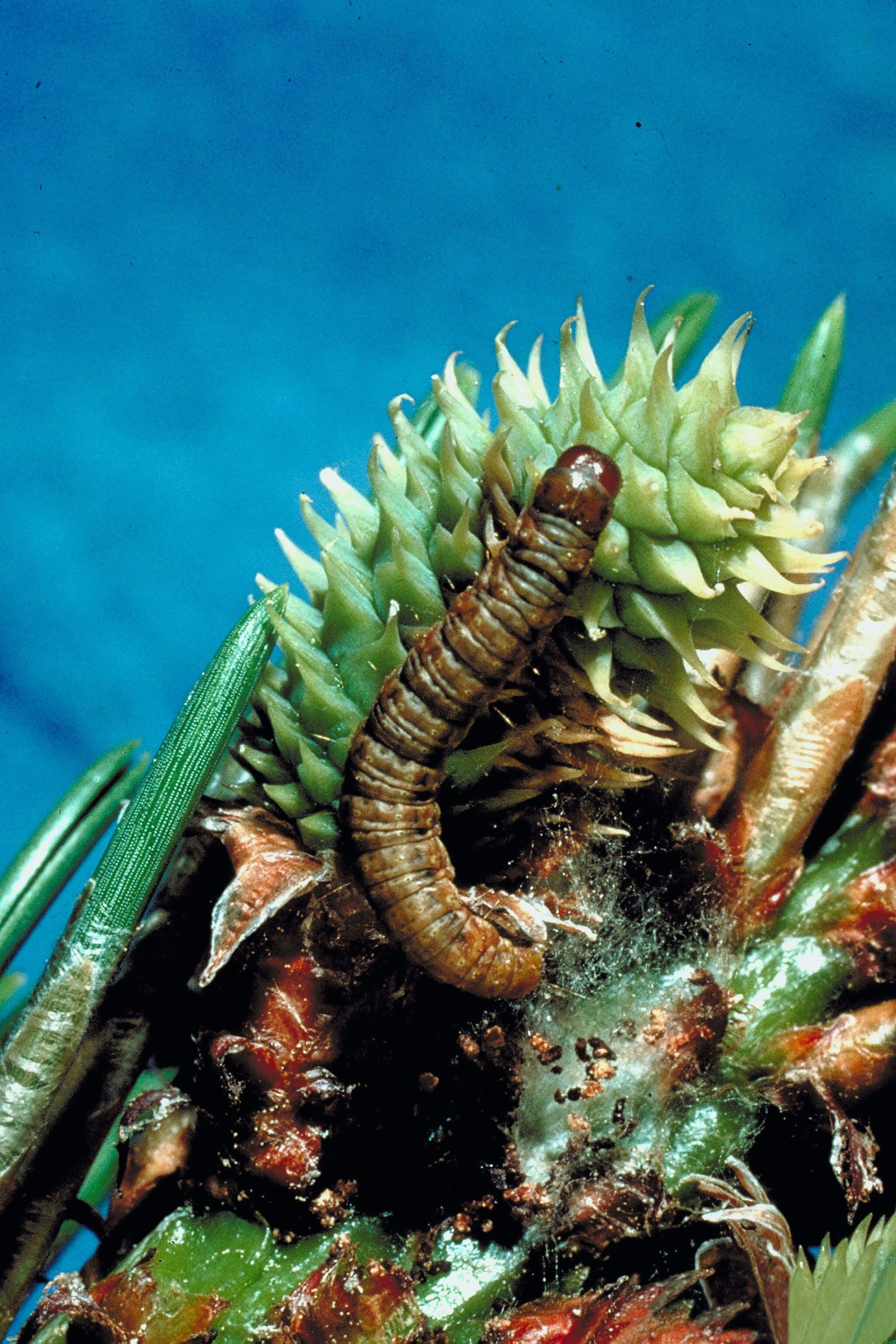
Larva

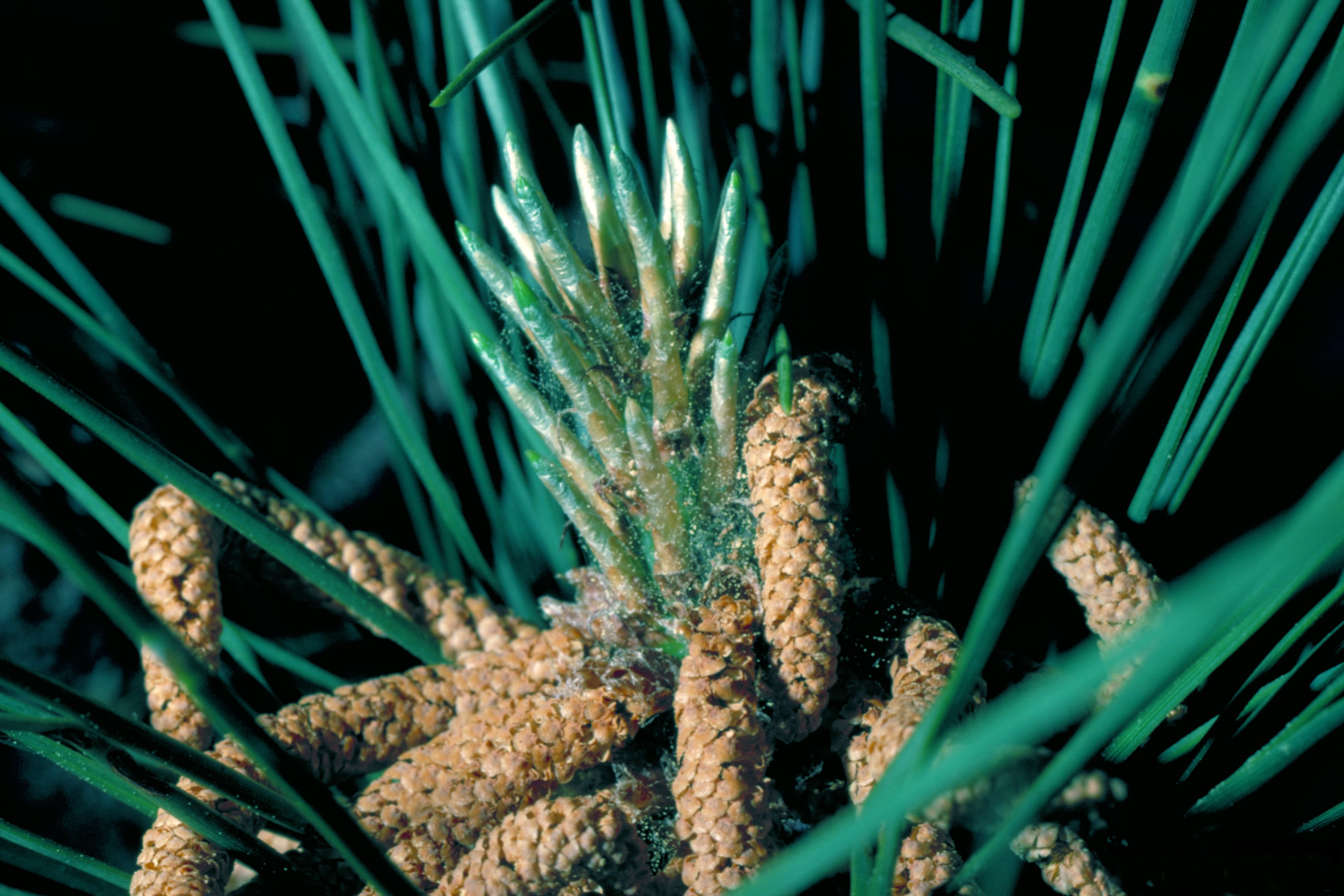
Damage

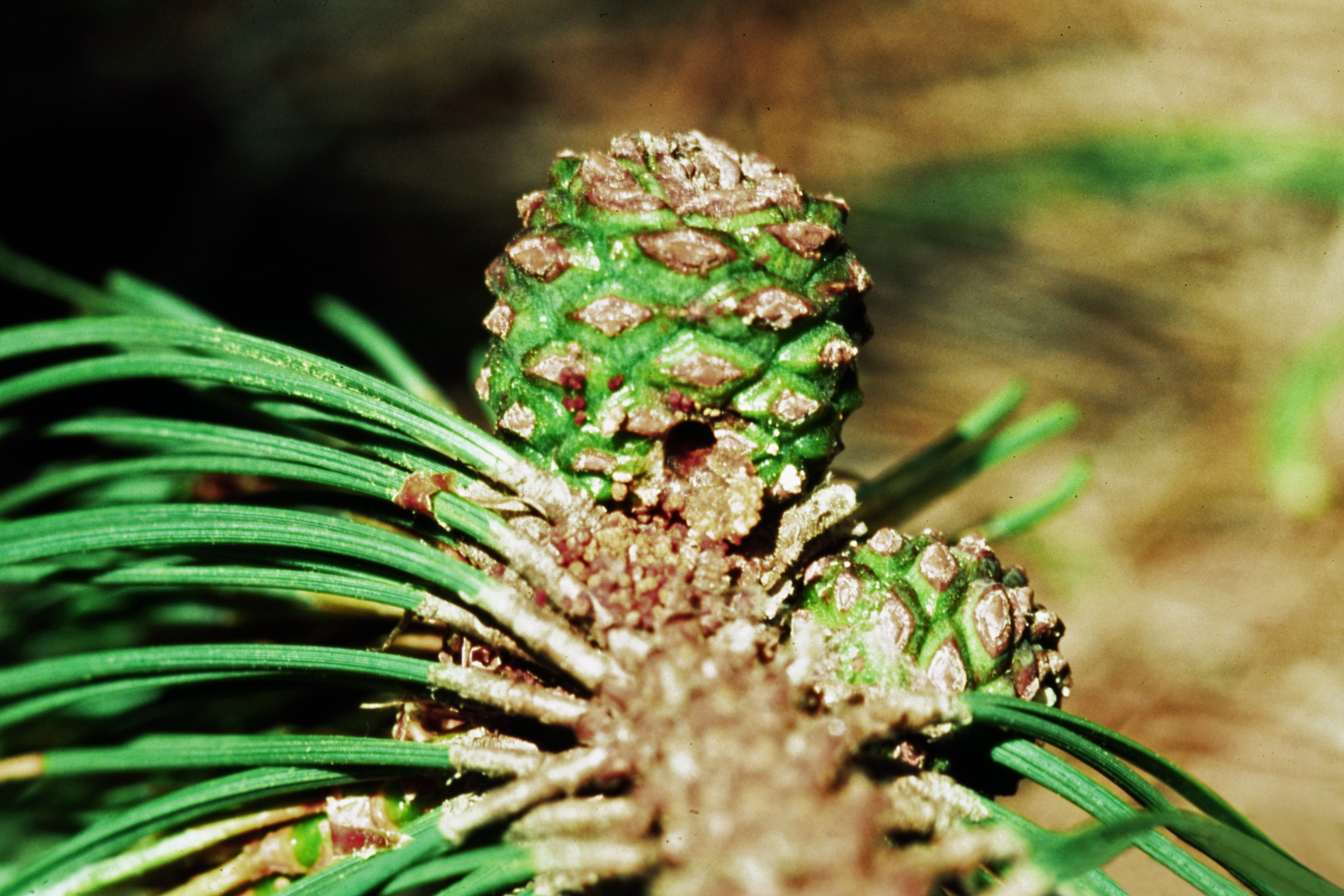
Damage

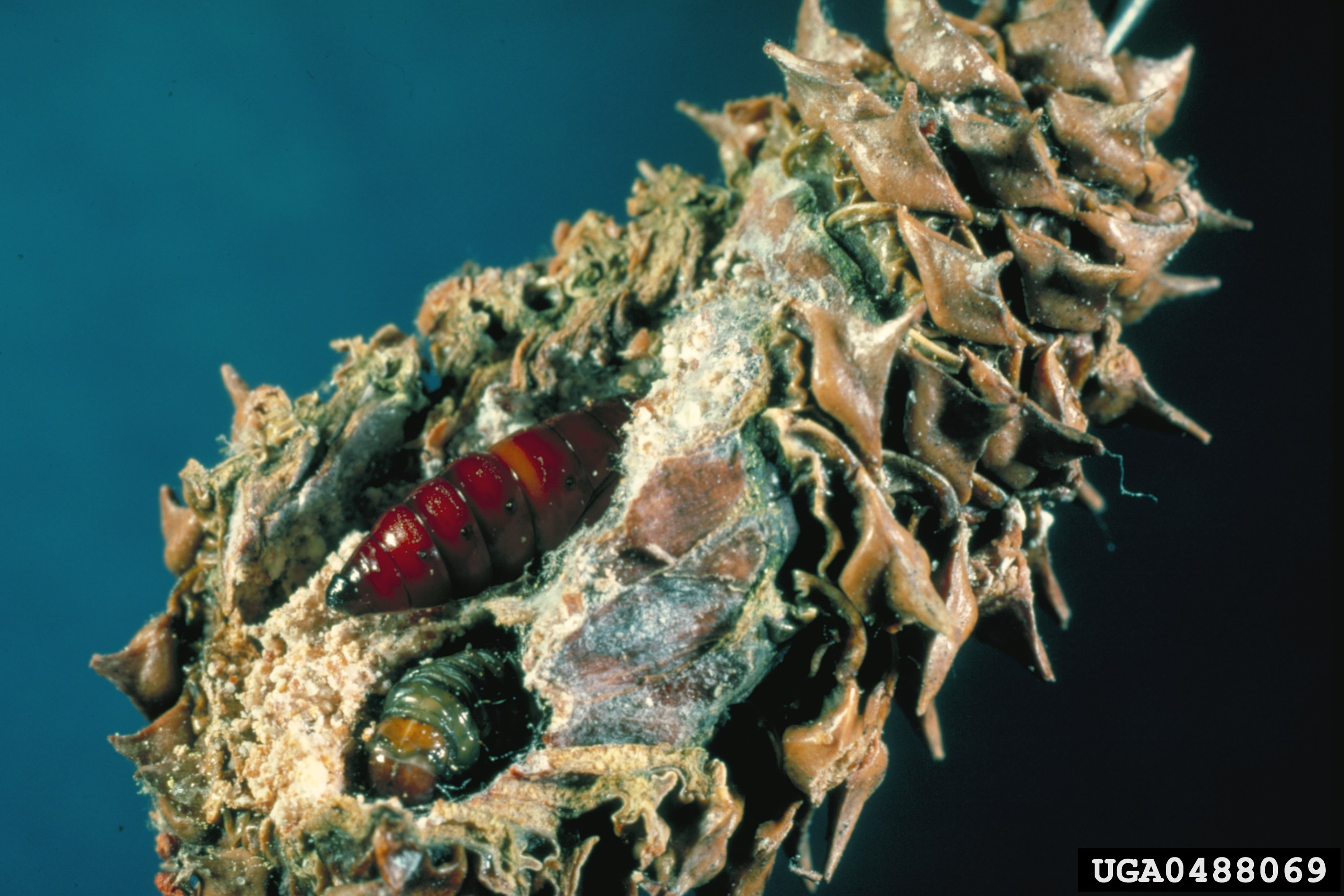
Pupa
