= Ephestiodes erasa =

Scientific classification
- Domain: Eukaryota
- Kingdom: Animalia
- Phylum: Arthropoda
- Class: Insecta
- Order: Lepidoptera
- Family: Pyralidae
- Genus: Ephestiodes
- Species: E. erasa

Binomial name
- Ephestiodes erasa Heinrich, 1956

Species of moth

Ephestiodes erasa is a species of snout moth in the genus Ephestiodes. It was described by Carl Heinrich in 1956. It is found in the US states of Florida and Georgia.
