= Rupela faustina =

Scientific classification
- Kingdom: Animalia
- Phylum: Arthropoda
- Clade: Pancrustacea
- Class: Insecta
- Order: Lepidoptera
- Family: Crambidae
- Genus: Rupela
- Species: R. faustina

Binomial name
- Rupela faustina Heinrich, 1937

Species of moth

Rupela faustina is a moth in the family Crambidae. It was described by Carl Heinrich in 1937. It is found in Panama.

The wingspan is 21–25 mm. The wings are white.
