= Rupela vexativa =

Scientific classification
- Domain: Eukaryota
- Kingdom: Animalia
- Phylum: Arthropoda
- Class: Insecta
- Order: Lepidoptera
- Family: Crambidae
- Genus: Rupela
- Species: R. vexativa

Binomial name
- Rupela vexativa Heinrich, 1937

Species of moth

Rupela vexativa is a moth in the family Crambidae. It was described by Carl Heinrich in 1937. It is found in Guatemala.

The wingspan is about 27 mm. The wings are pure white. Adults have been recorded on wing in April.
