= Entmemacornis pulla =

Scientific classification
- Domain: Eukaryota
- Kingdom: Animalia
- Phylum: Arthropoda
- Class: Insecta
- Order: Lepidoptera
- Family: Pyralidae
- Genus: Entmemacornis
- Species: E. pulla

Binomial name
- Entmemacornis pulla Heinrich, 1956

Species of moth

Entmemacornis pulla is a species of snout moth. It was described by Carl Heinrich in 1956. It is found in Brazil.
