= Rupela imitativa =

Scientific classification
- Domain: Eukaryota
- Kingdom: Animalia
- Phylum: Arthropoda
- Class: Insecta
- Order: Lepidoptera
- Family: Crambidae
- Genus: Rupela
- Species: R. imitativa

Binomial name
- Rupela imitativa Heinrich, 1937

Species of moth

Rupela imitativa is a moth in the family Crambidae. It was described by Carl Heinrich in 1937. It is found in Paraná, Brazil.

The wingspan is 36–38 mm. The wings are shining white.
