= Rupela liberta =

Scientific classification
- Kingdom: Animalia
- Phylum: Arthropoda
- Class: Insecta
- Order: Lepidoptera
- Family: Crambidae
- Genus: Rupela
- Species: R. liberta

Binomial name
- Rupela liberta Heinrich, 1937

Species of moth

Rupela liberta is a moth in the family Crambidae. It was described by Carl Heinrich in 1937. It is found in Mexico (Durango, Colima, Jalapa) and Panama.

The wingspan is 20–25 mm. The wings are white.
