= Rupela gibbera =

Scientific classification
- Domain: Eukaryota
- Kingdom: Animalia
- Phylum: Arthropoda
- Class: Insecta
- Order: Lepidoptera
- Family: Crambidae
- Genus: Rupela
- Species: R. gibbera

Binomial name
- Rupela gibbera Heinrich, 1937

Species of moth

Rupela gibbera is a moth in the family Crambidae. It was described by Carl Heinrich in 1937. It is found in Suriname.

The wingspan is about 23 mm. The wings are shiny white. Adults have been recorded on wing in May.
