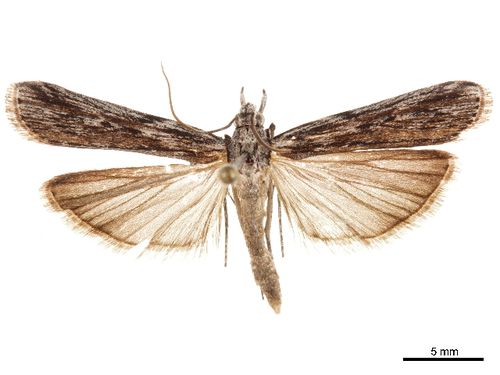

Scientific classification
- Domain: Eukaryota
- Kingdom: Animalia
- Phylum: Arthropoda
- Class: Insecta
- Order: Lepidoptera
- Family: Pyralidae
- Genus: Interjectio
- Species: I. columbiella

Binomial name
- Interjectio columbiella (McDunnough, 1935)

Synonyms
- Ambesa columbiella McDunnough, 1935

= Interjectio columbiella =

Species of moth

Interjectio columbiella is a species of snout moth described by James Halliday McDunnough in 1935. It is found in the US states of California and Nevada.
