= Erelieva parvulella =

Scientific classification
- Domain: Eukaryota
- Kingdom: Animalia
- Phylum: Arthropoda
- Class: Insecta
- Order: Lepidoptera
- Family: Pyralidae
- Genus: Erelieva
- Species: E. parvulella

Binomial name
- Erelieva parvulella (Ely, 1910)

Synonyms
- Eurythmia parvulella Ely, 1910

Species of moth

Erelieva parvulella is a species of snout moth in the genus Erelieva. It was described by Charles Russell Ely in 1910. It is found in North America, including Illinois and Tennessee.
