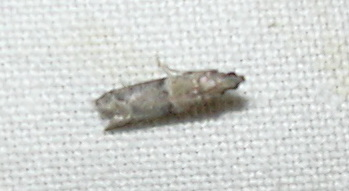
- Ephestiodes gilvescentella

Scientific classification
- Domain: Eukaryota
- Kingdom: Animalia
- Phylum: Arthropoda
- Class: Insecta
- Order: Lepidoptera
- Family: Pyralidae
- Subfamily: Phycitinae
- Genus: Ephestiodes; Ragonot, 1887

= Ephestiodes =

Genus of moths

Ephestiodes is a genus of snout moths. It was described by Émile Louis Ragonot in 1887.

== Species ==
- Ephestiodes erasa Heinrich, 1956
- Ephestiodes erythrella Ragonot, 1887
- Ephestiodes gilvescentella Ragonot, 1887
- Ephestiodes griseus Neunzig, 1990
- Ephestiodes infimella Ragonot, 1887
- Ephestiodes mignonella Dyar, 1908
- Ephestiodes monticolus Neunzig, 1990
- Ephestiodes noniella Dyar, 1914
