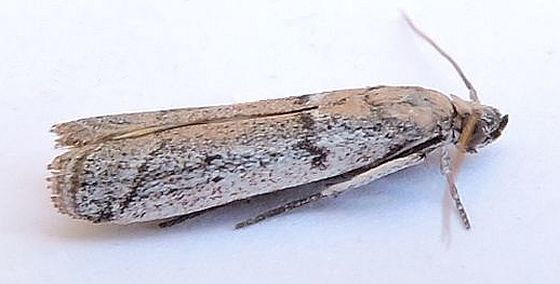

Scientific classification
- Domain: Eukaryota
- Kingdom: Animalia
- Phylum: Arthropoda
- Class: Insecta
- Order: Lepidoptera
- Family: Pyralidae
- Genus: Anderida
- Species: A. sonorella

Binomial name
- Anderida sonorella (Ragonot, 1887)

Synonyms
- Euzophera sonorella Ragonot, 1887; Anderida sonorella (Ragonot, 1887); Anderida senorella (Ragonot, 1887); Anderida placidella (Dyar, 1908)

= Anderida sonorella =

Species of moth

Anderida sonorella is a species of snout moth described by Émile Louis Ragonot in 1887. It is found in North America, including Arizona.
