= Entmemacornis =

Scientific classification
- Kingdom: Animalia
- Phylum: Arthropoda
- Class: Insecta
- Order: Lepidoptera
- Family: Pyralidae
- Subfamily: Phycitinae
- Genus: Entmemacornis; Dyar, 1919

Genus of moths

Entmemacornis is a genus of snout moths. It was described by Harrison Gray Dyar Jr. in 1919.

== Species ==
- Entmemacornis proselytes Dyar, 1919
- Entmemacornis pulla Heinrich, 1956
