= Caristanius veracruzensis =

Scientific classification
- Domain: Eukaryota
- Kingdom: Animalia
- Phylum: Arthropoda
- Class: Insecta
- Order: Lepidoptera
- Family: Pyralidae
- Genus: Caristanius
- Species: C. veracruzensis

Binomial name
- Caristanius veracruzensis Neunzig, 2004

Species of moth

Caristanius veracruzensis is a species of snout moth in the genus Caristanius. It was described by Herbert H. Neunzig in 2004, and is known from Veracruz, Mexico.
