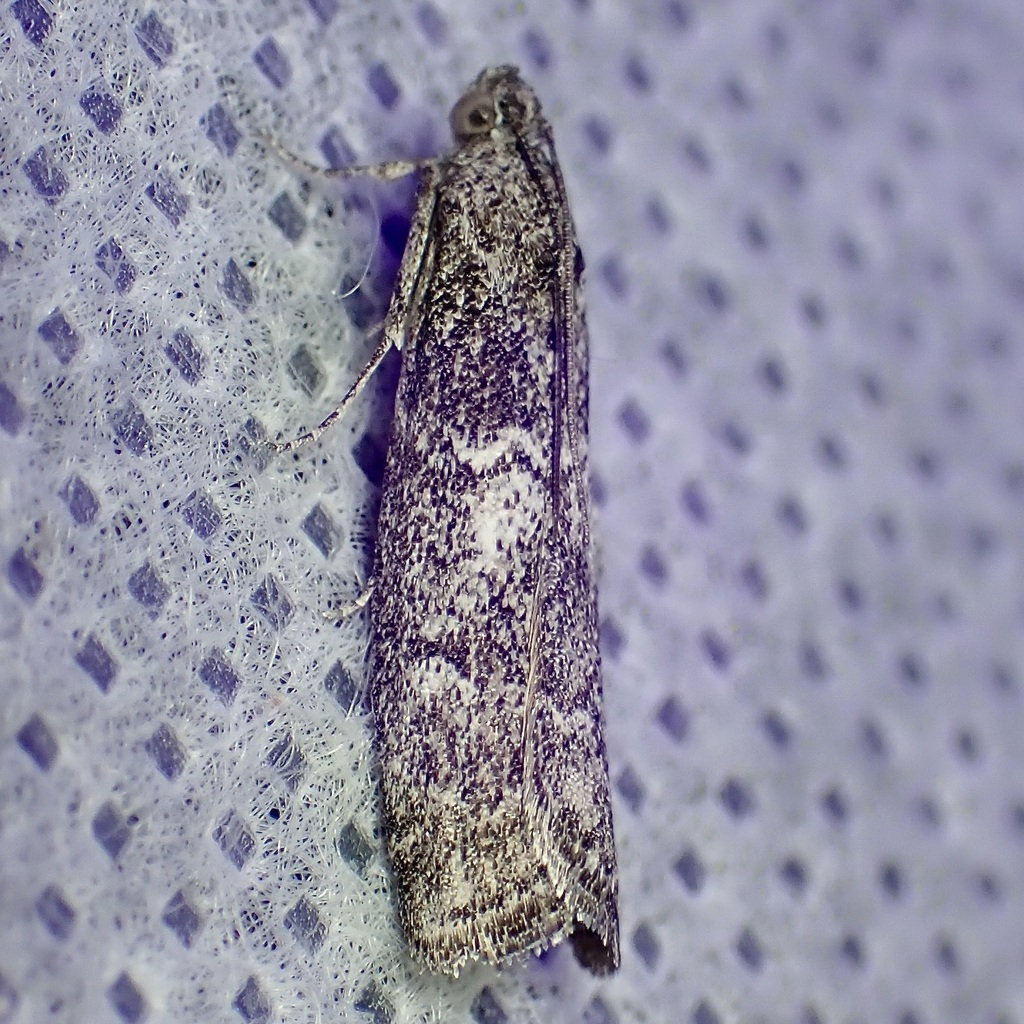

Scientific classification
- Kingdom: Animalia
- Phylum: Arthropoda
- Class: Insecta
- Order: Lepidoptera
- Family: Pyralidae
- Genus: Olybria
- Species: O. furciferella

Binomial name
- Olybria furciferella (Dyar, 1904)

Synonyms
- Salebria furciferella Dyar, 1904

= Olybria furciferella =

Species of moth

Olybria furciferella is a species of snout moth in the genus Olybria. It was described by Harrison Gray Dyar Jr. in 1904 and is known from the US states of Arizona, Nevada and Texas.
