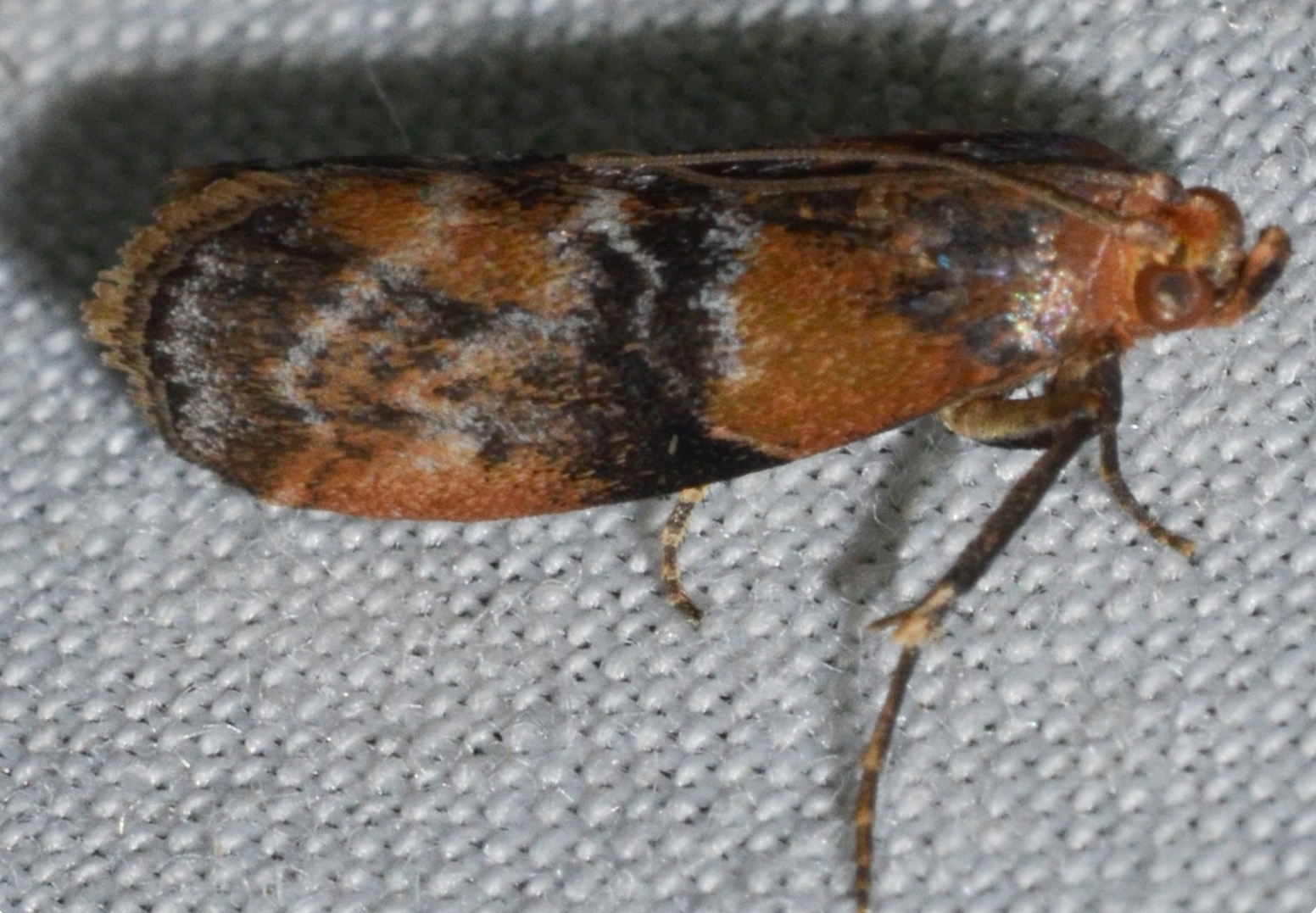

Scientific classification
- Domain: Eukaryota
- Kingdom: Animalia
- Phylum: Arthropoda
- Class: Insecta
- Order: Lepidoptera
- Family: Pyralidae
- Genus: Meroptera
- Species: M. cviatella

Binomial name
- Meroptera cviatella Dyar, 1905

= Meroptera cviatella =

Species of insect

Meroptera cviatella, the poplar bud borer moth, is a species of snout moth in the genus Meroptera. It was described by Harrison Gray Dyar Jr. in 1905 and is known from North America, including Illinois, Colorado, Iowa, Oklahoma and Quebec.

The wingspan is 22–25 mm. The basal space, costa and inner margin of the wing are broadly bright reddish brown, while the center beyond the base is purplish gray.

The larvae feed on the buds of Populus species.
