= Meroptera nevadensis =

Scientific classification
- Domain: Eukaryota
- Kingdom: Animalia
- Phylum: Arthropoda
- Class: Insecta
- Order: Lepidoptera
- Family: Pyralidae
- Genus: Meroptera
- Species: M. nevadensis

Binomial name
- Meroptera nevadensis Neunzig, 2003

Species of moth

Meroptera nevadensis is a species of snout moth in the genus Meroptera. It was described by Herbert H. Neunzig in 2003 from Elko County, Nevada in the United States.Its species epithet references the state of Nevada. The species is also found in Arizona and California.
