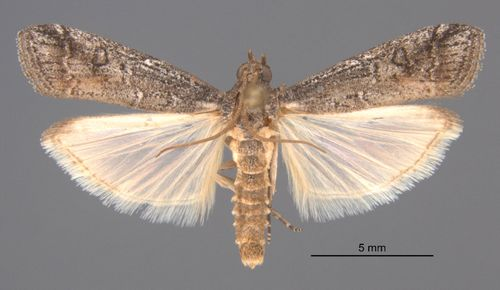

Scientific classification
- Domain: Eukaryota
- Kingdom: Animalia
- Phylum: Arthropoda
- Class: Insecta
- Order: Lepidoptera
- Family: Pyralidae
- Genus: Chararica
- Species: C. annuliferella

Binomial name
- Chararica annuliferella (Dyar, 1905)

Synonyms
- Myelois annuliferella Dyar, 1905

= Chararica annuliferella =

Species of moth

Chararica annuliferella is a species of snout moth. It was described by Harrison Gray Dyar Jr. in 1905. It is found in North America.
