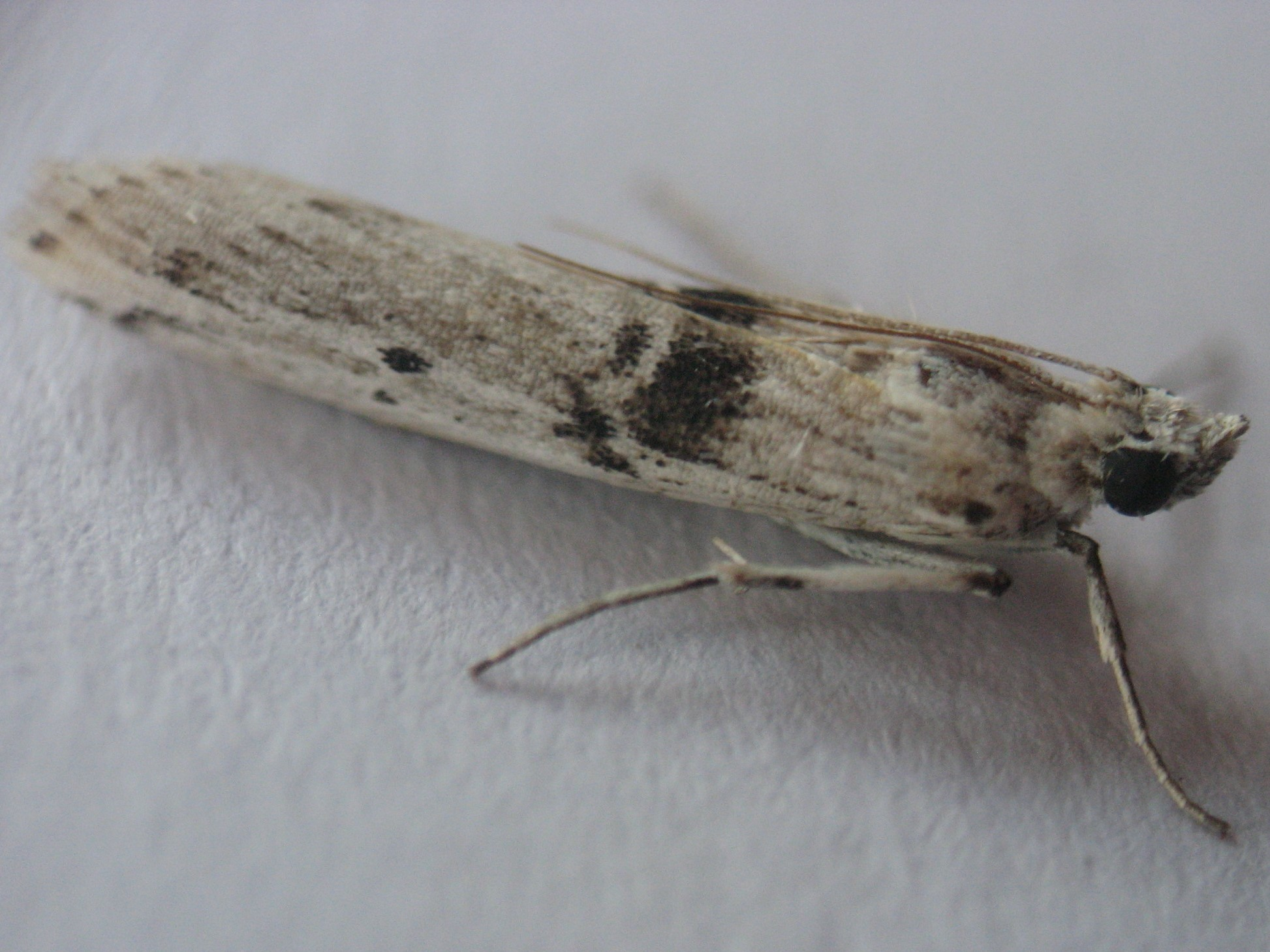

Scientific classification
- Domain: Eukaryota
- Kingdom: Animalia
- Phylum: Arthropoda
- Class: Insecta
- Order: Lepidoptera
- Family: Pyralidae
- Genus: Interjectio
- Species: I. niviella

Binomial name
- Interjectio niviella (Hulst, 1888)

Synonyms
- Lipographis niviella Hulst, 1888

= Interjectio niviella =

Species of moth

Interjectio niviella is a species of snout moth in the genus Interjectio described by George Duryea Hulst in 1888. It is found in North America in Colorado, Manitoba, Alberta, North Dakota, Iowa and Arizona.

The length of the forewings is about 12.3 mm. The ground color of the forewings is white.
