= Caristanius pellucidella =

Scientific classification
- Domain: Eukaryota
- Kingdom: Animalia
- Phylum: Arthropoda
- Class: Insecta
- Order: Lepidoptera
- Family: Pyralidae
- Genus: Caristanius
- Species: C. pellucidella

Binomial name
- Caristanius pellucidella (Ragonot, 1889)

Synonyms
- Oligochroa pellucidella Ragonot, 1889

Species of moth

Caristanius pellucidella is a species of snout moth in the genus Caristanius. It was described by Ragonot in 1889 and is known from Puerto Rico.
