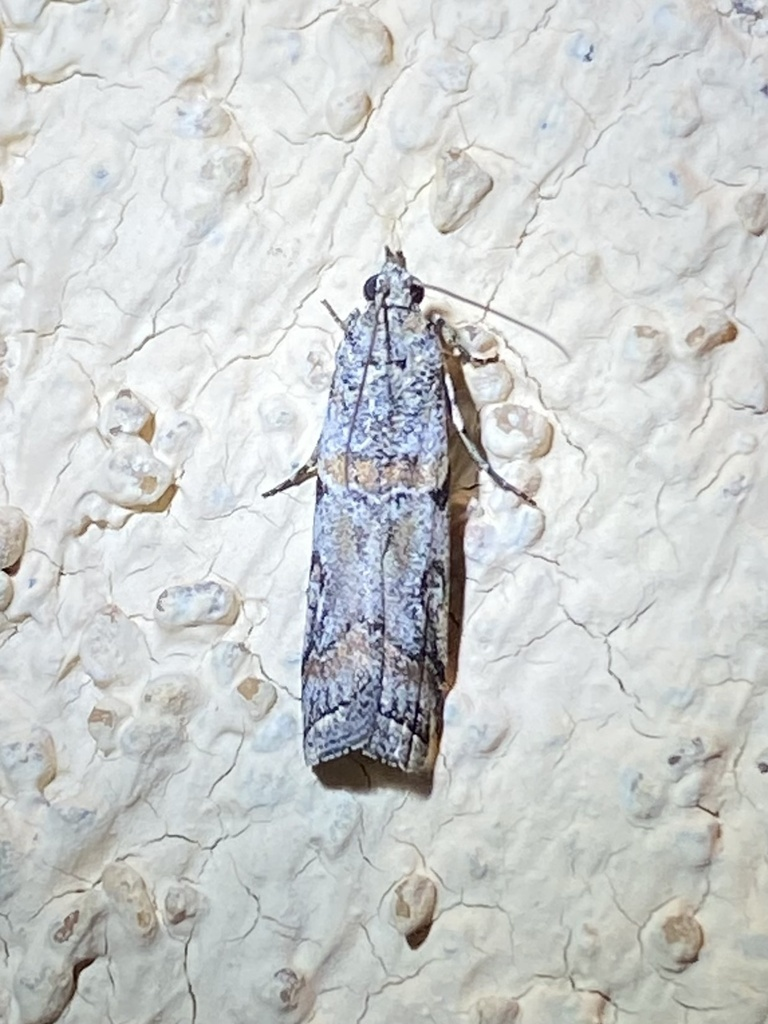

Scientific classification
- Domain: Eukaryota
- Kingdom: Animalia
- Phylum: Arthropoda
- Class: Insecta
- Order: Lepidoptera
- Family: Pyralidae
- Genus: Olybria
- Species: O. aliculella

Binomial name
- Olybria aliculella (Hulst, 1887)

Synonyms
- Myelois aliculella Hulst, 1887; Salebria oberthuriella Dyar, 1887

= Olybria aliculella =

Species of moth

Olybria aliculella is a species of snout moth, and the type species in the genus Olybria. It was described by George Duryea Hulst in 1887 and is known from Arizona, New Mexico and Texas.
