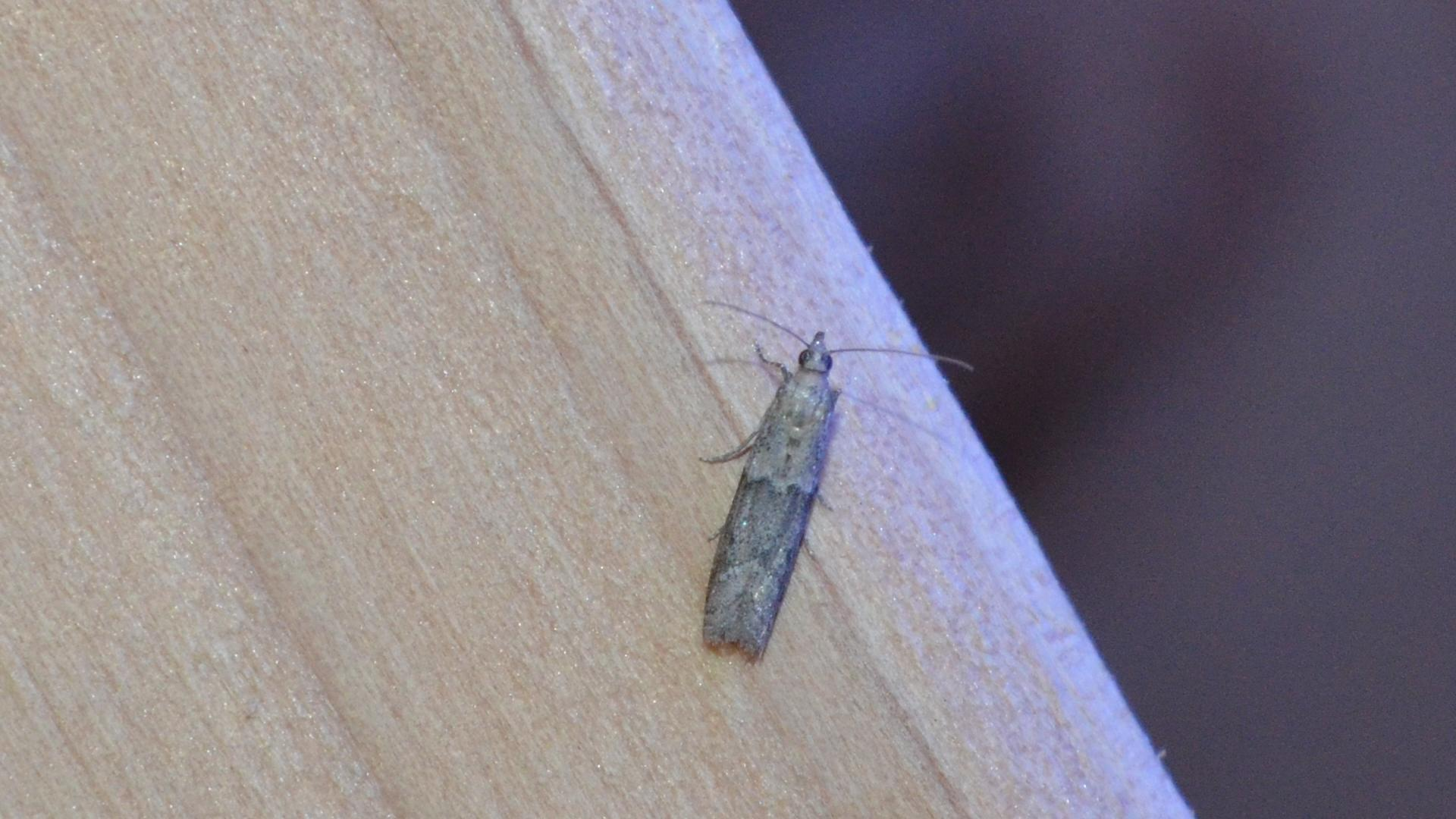

Scientific classification
- Kingdom: Animalia
- Phylum: Arthropoda
- Clade: Pancrustacea
- Class: Insecta
- Order: Lepidoptera
- Family: Pyralidae
- Genus: Ephestiodes
- Species: E. infimella

Binomial name
- Ephestiodes infimella Ragonot, 1887

= Ephestiodes infimella =

Species of moth

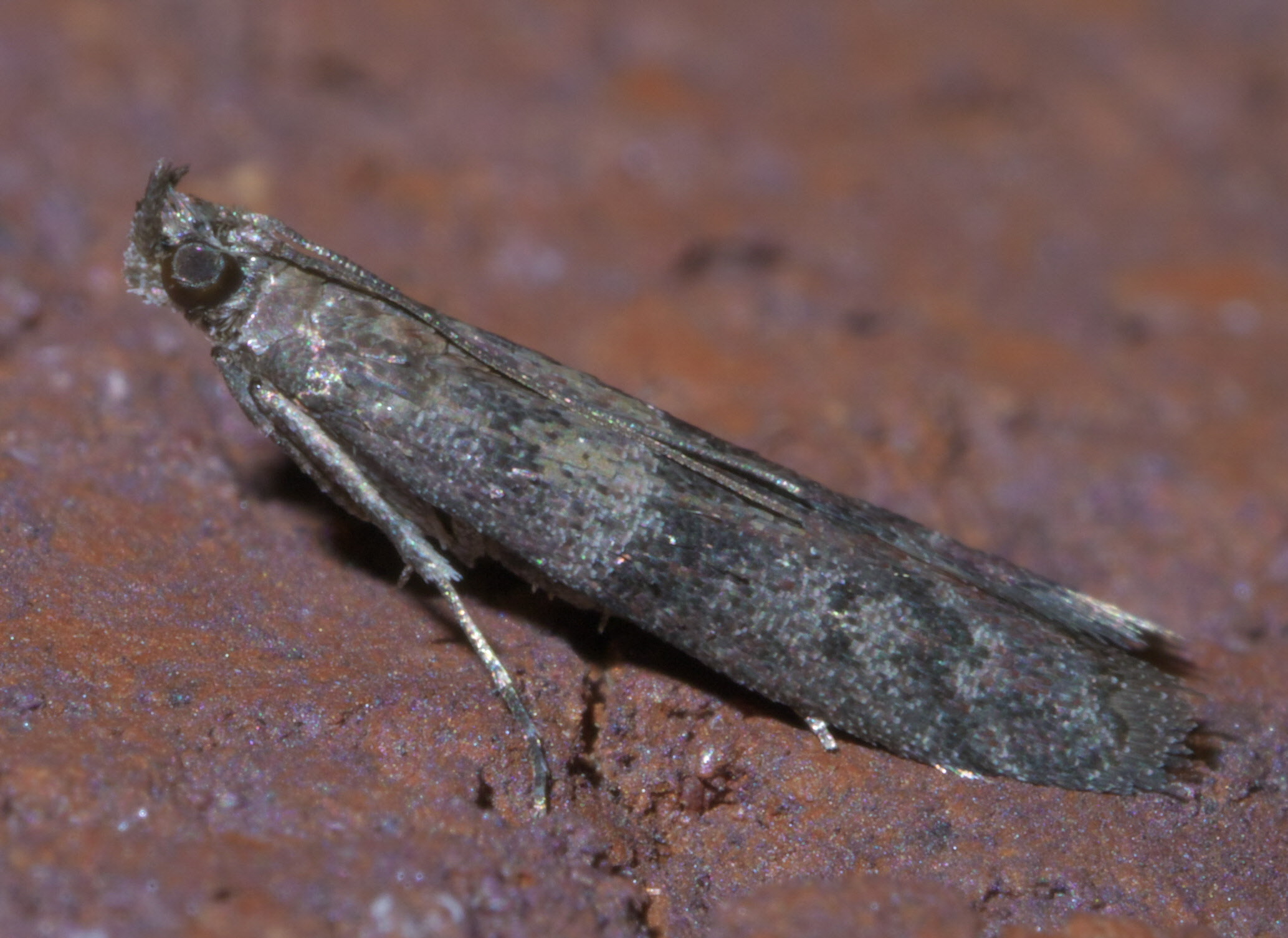
Ephestiodes infimella, Size: 7.1 mm

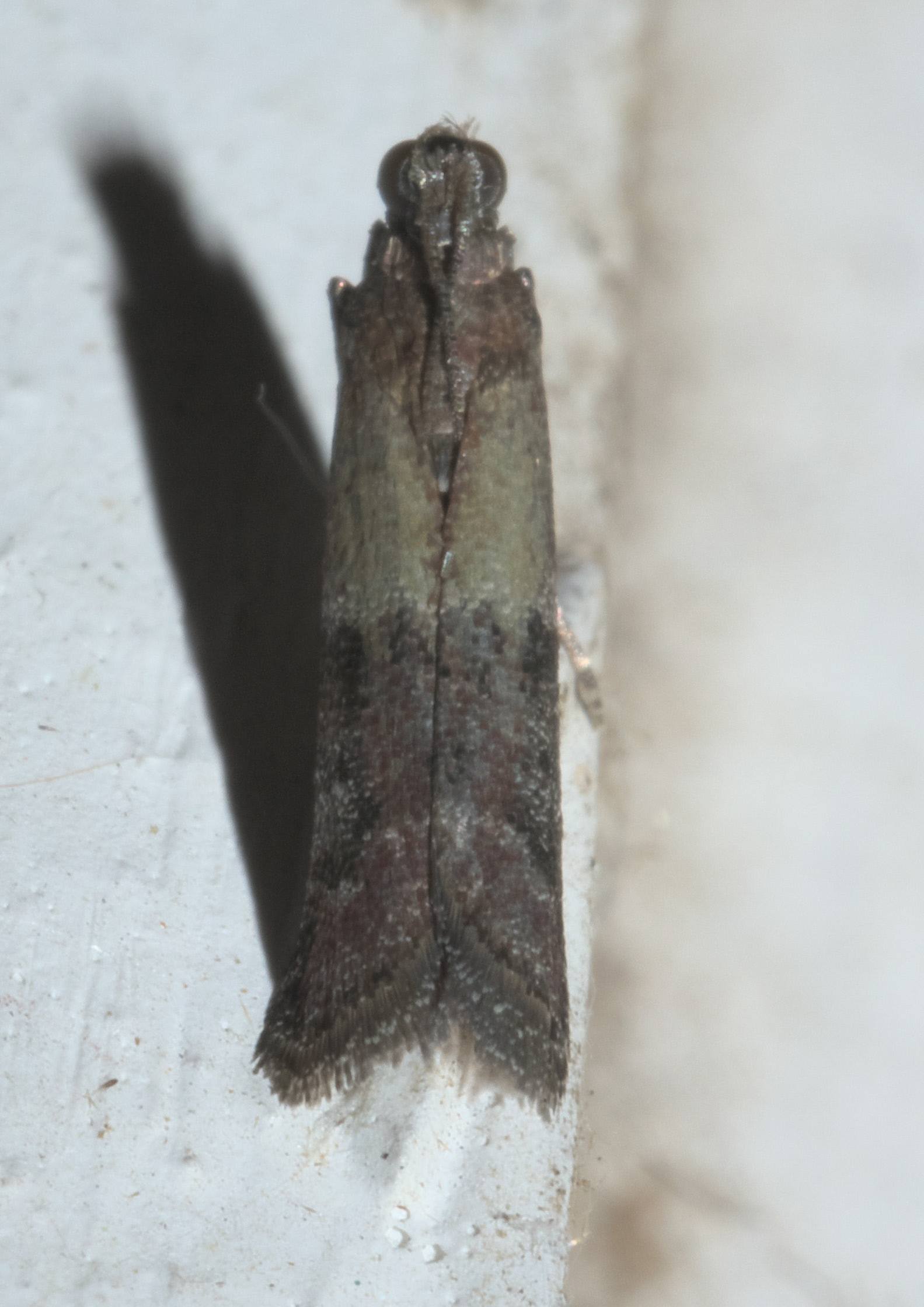
Ephestiodes infimella, Size: 6.1 mm

Ephestiodes infimella is a moth of the family Pyralidae. It was described by Émile Louis Ragonot in 1887. It is native to North America, where it is mostly found in the eastern half of the continent, eastward of Texas and Manitoba. In Canada, it is only recorded in the southern parts of the country. It has also been recorded in Arizona and in northwestern Mexico.

The wingspan is about 11 mm. Adults are on wing throughout much of the year in Florida. In Rhode Island, adults are bivoltine and on wing from June to September.
