= Anadelosemia =

Scientific classification
- Domain: Eukaryota
- Kingdom: Animalia
- Phylum: Arthropoda
- Class: Insecta
- Order: Lepidoptera
- Family: Pyralidae
- Subfamily: Phycitinae
- Genus: Anadelosemia; Dyar, 1919

Genus of moths

Anadelosemia is a genus of snout moths. It was described by Harrison Gray Dyar Jr. in 1919.

== Species ==
- Anadelosemia condigna Heinrich, 1956
- Anadelosemia senesciella Schaus, 1913
- Anadelosemia texanella (Hulst, 1892)
