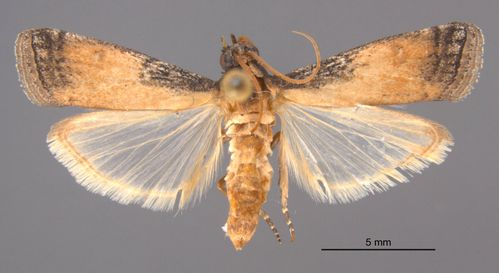

Scientific classification
- Domain: Eukaryota
- Kingdom: Animalia
- Phylum: Arthropoda
- Class: Insecta
- Order: Lepidoptera
- Family: Pyralidae
- Genus: Chararica
- Species: C. bicolorella

Binomial name
- Chararica bicolorella (Barnes & McDunnough, 1917)

Synonyms
- Rhodophaea bicolorella Barnes & McDunnough, 1917

= Chararica bicolorella =

Species of moth

Chararica bicolorella is a species of snout moth in the genus Chararica. It was described by William Barnes and James Halliday McDunnough in 1917. It is found in the US states of California and Arizona.

The wingspan is about 23 mm.
