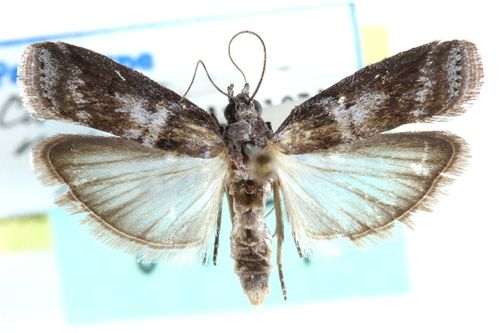

Scientific classification
- Domain: Eukaryota
- Kingdom: Animalia
- Phylum: Arthropoda
- Class: Insecta
- Order: Lepidoptera
- Family: Pyralidae
- Genus: Caristanius
- Species: C. minimus

Binomial name
- Caristanius minimus Neunzig, 1977

= Caristanius minimus =

Species of moth

Caristanius minimus is a species of snout moth in the genus Caristanius. It was described by Herbert H. Neunzig in 1977, and is only known from southern Florida, United States.

There appear to be several generations per year.

The larvae feed on Cassia keyensis.
