= Rupela nivea =

Scientific classification
- Kingdom: Animalia
- Phylum: Arthropoda
- Class: Insecta
- Order: Lepidoptera
- Family: Crambidae
- Genus: Rupela
- Species: R. nivea

Binomial name
- Rupela nivea Walker, 1863

Species of moth

Rupela nivea is a moth in the family Crambidae. It was described by Francis Walker in 1863. It is found in Panama, Brazil (Paraná, Pará) and Argentina.

The wingspan is 24–37 mm. The wings are pure white.
