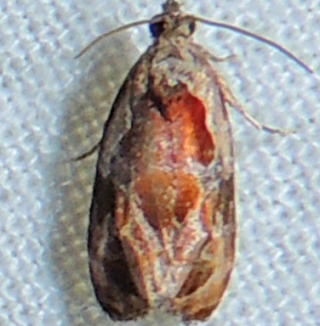

Scientific classification
- Kingdom: Animalia
- Phylum: Arthropoda
- Clade: Pancrustacea
- Class: Insecta
- Order: Lepidoptera
- Family: Tortricidae
- Genus: Zomaria
- Species: Z. interruptolineana

Binomial name
- Zomaria interruptolineana Fernald, 1882

= Zomaria interruptolineana =

Species of moth

Zomaria interruptolineana, the broken-lined zomarium, is a species of tortricid moth in the family Tortricidae. It is found in the Nearctic.
