= Erelieva quantulella =

Scientific classification
- Kingdom: Animalia
- Phylum: Arthropoda
- Class: Insecta
- Order: Lepidoptera
- Family: Pyralidae
- Genus: Erelieva
- Species: E. quantulella

Binomial name
- Erelieva quantulella (Hulst, 1887)

Synonyms
- Pempelia quantulella Hulst, 1887; Eurythmia santiagella Dyar, 1919

Species of moth

Erelieva quantulella is a species of snout moth. It was described by George Duryea Hulst in 1887. It is found in the south-eastern United States.
