= Ephestiodes monticolus =

Scientific classification
- Kingdom: Animalia
- Phylum: Arthropoda
- Class: Insecta
- Order: Lepidoptera
- Family: Pyralidae
- Genus: Ephestiodes
- Species: E. monticolus

Binomial name
- Ephestiodes monticolus Neunzig, 1990

Species of moth

Ephestiodes monticolus is a species of snout moth in the genus Ephestiodes. It was described by Herbert H. Neunzig in 1990 and is known from the US state of Arizona.
