= Interjectio denticulella =

Scientific classification
- Domain: Eukaryota
- Kingdom: Animalia
- Phylum: Arthropoda
- Class: Insecta
- Order: Lepidoptera
- Family: Pyralidae
- Genus: Interjectio
- Species: I. denticulella

Binomial name
- Interjectio denticulella (Ragonot, 1887)

Synonyms
- Pristophora denticulella Ragonot 1887; Epischnia ruderella Ragonot, 1887; Interjectio ruderella

Species of moth

Interjectio denticulella is a species of snout moth in the genus Interjectio. It was described by Émile Louis Ragonot in 1887 and is found in the US state of California.
