= Aptunga setadebilia =

Scientific classification
- Domain: Eukaryota
- Kingdom: Animalia
- Phylum: Arthropoda
- Class: Insecta
- Order: Lepidoptera
- Family: Pyralidae
- Genus: Aptunga
- Species: A. setadebilia

Binomial name
- Aptunga setadebilia Neunzig, 1996

Species of moth

Aptunga setadebilia is a species of snout moth. It was described by Herbert H. Neunzig in 1996. It is found in the Dominican Republic.

The length of the forewings is 8.5–9 mm.
