= Chararica circiimperfecta =

Scientific classification
- Domain: Eukaryota
- Kingdom: Animalia
- Phylum: Arthropoda
- Class: Insecta
- Order: Lepidoptera
- Family: Pyralidae
- Genus: Chararica
- Species: C. circiimperfecta

Binomial name
- Chararica circiimperfecta Neunzig, 1996

Species of moth

Chararica circiimperfecta is a species of snout moth in the genus Chararica. It was described by Herbert H. Neunzig in 1996 and is known from the Dominican Republic.

The length of the forewings is 7–8 mm. The ground colour of the forewings is fuscous to black.
