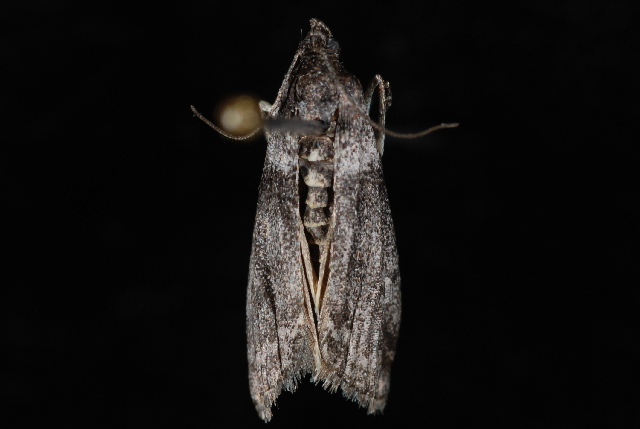

Scientific classification
- Kingdom: Animalia
- Phylum: Arthropoda
- Class: Insecta
- Order: Lepidoptera
- Family: Pyralidae
- Genus: Meroptera
- Species: M. pravella

Binomial name
- Meroptera pravella (Grote, 1878)

Synonyms
- Pempelia pravella Grote, 1878

= Meroptera pravella =

Species of moth

Meroptera pravella is a species of snout moth in the genus Meroptera. It was described by Augustus Radcliffe Grote in 1878. It is found in western North America from British Columbia to Idaho, Utah, Colorado and eastern Oregon.

The length of the forewings is 9–10 mm. Adults are on wing from May to July.

The larvae feed on Salicaceae species, including Populus tremuloides. They are rarely also found on Betula and Alnus species.
