= Entmemacornis proselytes =

Scientific classification
- Kingdom: Animalia
- Phylum: Arthropoda
- Class: Insecta
- Order: Lepidoptera
- Family: Pyralidae
- Genus: Entmemacornis
- Species: E. proselytes

Binomial name
- Entmemacornis proselytes Dyar, 1919

Species of moth

Entmemacornis proselytes is a species of snout moth. It was described by Harrison Gray Dyar Jr. in 1919. It is found in Guatemala.
