= Anadelosemia senesciella =

Scientific classification
- Domain: Eukaryota
- Kingdom: Animalia
- Phylum: Arthropoda
- Class: Insecta
- Order: Lepidoptera
- Family: Pyralidae
- Genus: Anadelosemia
- Species: A. senesciella

Binomial name
- Anadelosemia senesciella (Schaus, 1913)

Synonyms
- Nephopterix senesciella Schaus 1913

Species of moth

Anadelosemia senesciella is a species of snout moth. It is found in Costa Rica.

The wingspan is about 15 mm.
