= Rupela tinctella =

Scientific classification
- Kingdom: Animalia
- Phylum: Arthropoda
- Class: Insecta
- Order: Lepidoptera
- Family: Crambidae
- Genus: Rupela
- Species: R. tinctella

Binomial name
- Rupela tinctella (Walker, 1863)

Synonyms
- Salapola tinctella Walker, 1863; Scirpophaga zelleri Möschler, 1882; Scirpophaga holophaealis Hampson, 1904; Storteria unicolor Barnes & McDunnough, 1913

Species of moth

Rupela tinctella is a moth in the family Crambidae. It was described by Francis Walker in 1863. It is found in Florida, Georgia, Louisiana, Mississippi, North Carolina, South Carolina, Texas, Mexico, Cuba, the Guianas, Trinidad, Brazil (Paraná), Paraguay and northern Argentina.

The wingspan is 20–34 mm for males and 25–42 mm for females. The forewings and hindwings of the males are pale brown or brownish ochreous. The wings of the females range from sordid white to pure white. Adults have been recorded on wing from March to October.
