= Aptunga macropasa =

Scientific classification
- Kingdom: Animalia
- Phylum: Arthropoda
- Class: Insecta
- Order: Lepidoptera
- Family: Pyralidae
- Genus: Aptunga
- Species: A. macropasa

Binomial name
- Aptunga macropasa (Dyar, 1919)

Synonyms
- Vitula macropasa Dyar, 1919

Species of moth

Aptunga macropasa is a species of snout moth. It was described by Harrison Gray Dyar Jr. in 1919. It is found in Guatemala and Mexico.
