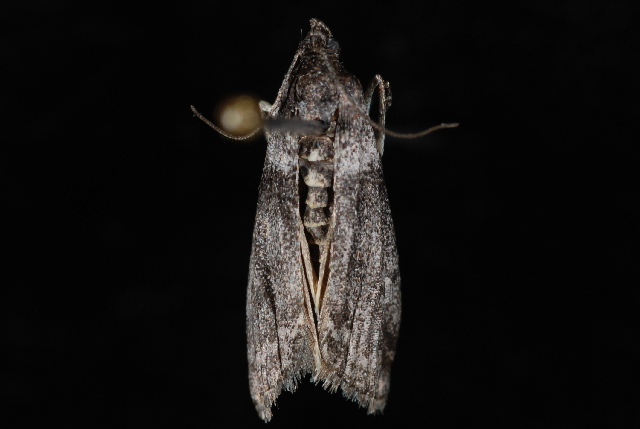
- Meroptera pravella

Scientific classification
- Domain: Eukaryota
- Kingdom: Animalia
- Phylum: Arthropoda
- Class: Insecta
- Order: Lepidoptera
- Family: Pyralidae
- Subfamily: Phycitinae
- Genus: Meroptera; Grote, 1882

Synonyms
- Emmerita Hampson, 1930

= Meroptera =

Genus of moths

Meroptera is a genus of snout moths. It was described by Augustus Radcliffe Grote in 1882.

== Species ==
- Meroptera abditiva Heinrich, 1956
- Meroptera anaimella A. Blanchard & Knudson, 1985
- Meroptera cviatella Dyar, 1905
- Meroptera mirandella Ragonot, 1893
- Meroptera nevadensis Neunzig, 2003
- Meroptera pravella (Grote, 1878)
