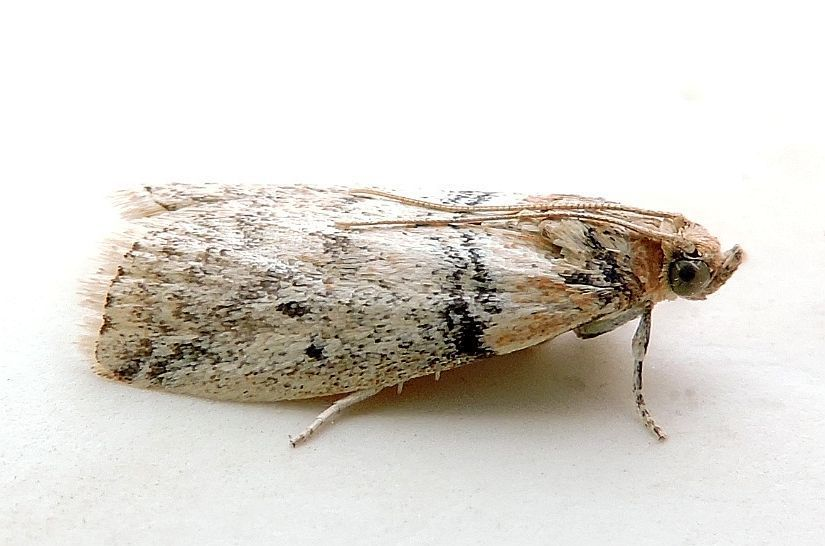

Scientific classification
- Domain: Eukaryota
- Kingdom: Animalia
- Phylum: Arthropoda
- Class: Insecta
- Order: Lepidoptera
- Family: Pyralidae
- Genus: Meroptera
- Species: M. anaimella

Binomial name
- Meroptera anaimella A. Blanchard & Knudson, 1985

= Meroptera anaimella =

Species of moth

Meroptera anaimella is a species of snout moth in the genus Meroptera. It was described by André Blanchard and Edward C. Knudson in 1985. It is found in the United States from southern California to Oklahoma and Texas.
