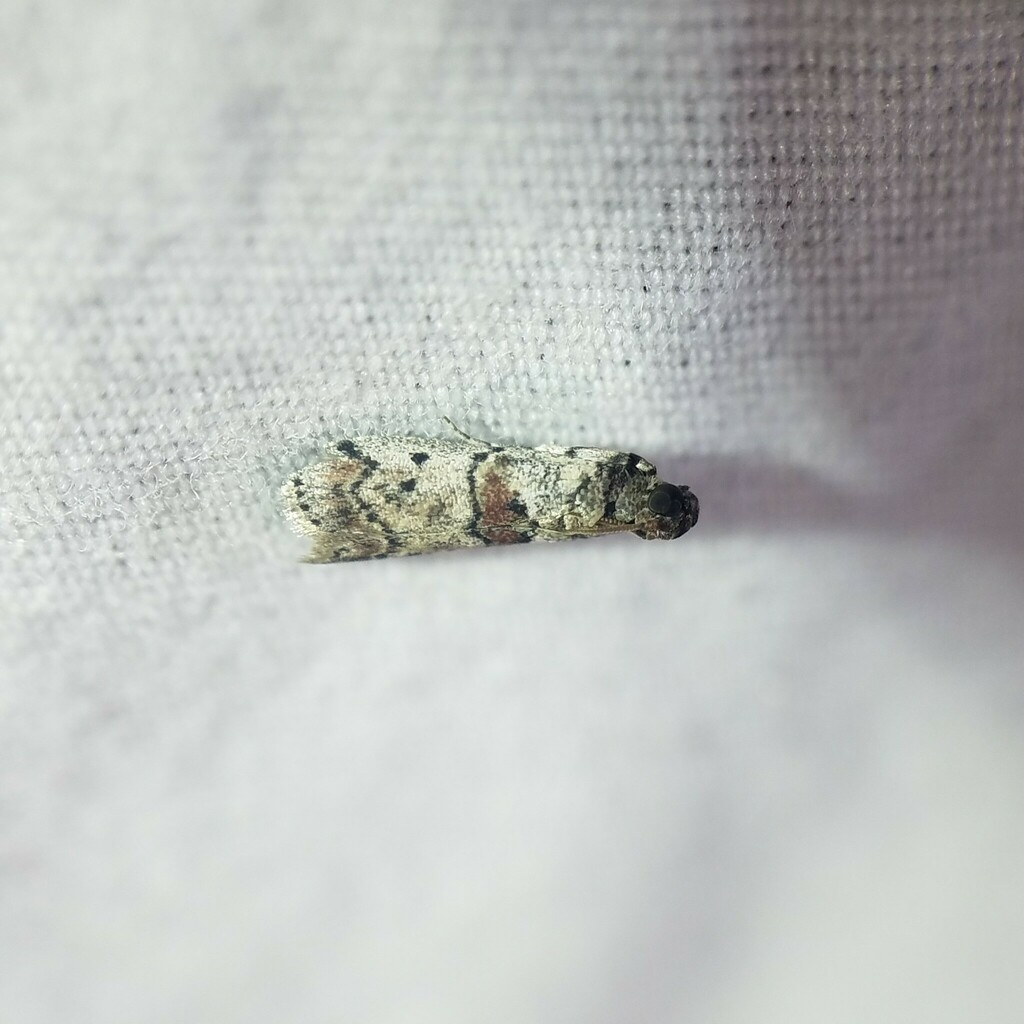

Scientific classification
- Domain: Eukaryota
- Kingdom: Animalia
- Phylum: Arthropoda
- Class: Insecta
- Order: Lepidoptera
- Family: Pyralidae
- Genus: Anadelosemia
- Species: A. texanella

Binomial name
- Anadelosemia texanella (Hulst, 1892)

Synonyms
- Myelois texanella Hulst, 1892; Honora dulciella Hulst, 1900

= Anadelosemia texanella =

Species of moth

Anadelosemia texanella is a species of snout moth in the genus Anadelosemia. It was described by George Duryea Hulst in 1892. It is found in the south-eastern United States.
