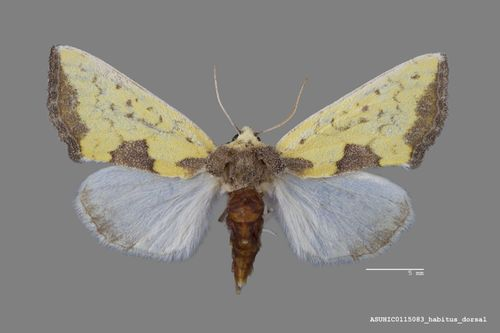

Scientific classification
- Domain: Eukaryota
- Kingdom: Animalia
- Phylum: Arthropoda
- Class: Insecta
- Order: Lepidoptera
- Family: Pyralidae
- Genus: Meroptera
- Species: M. mirandella

Binomial name
- Meroptera mirandella Ragonot, 1893

= Meroptera mirandella =

Species of moth

Meroptera mirandella is a species of snout moth in the genus Meroptera. It was described by Ragonot in 1893. It is found in southern North America, from Iowa to Arizona and southern California, including New Mexico, Oklahoma and Texas.
