= Aptunga vega =

Scientific classification
- Domain: Eukaryota
- Kingdom: Animalia
- Phylum: Arthropoda
- Class: Insecta
- Order: Lepidoptera
- Family: Pyralidae
- Genus: Aptunga
- Species: A. vega

Binomial name
- Aptunga vega Neunzig, 1996

Species of moth

Aptunga vega is a species of snout moth. It was described by Herbert H. Neunzig in 1996. It is found in the Dominican Republic.

The length of the forewings is 11.5–13 mm.

== Etymology ==
The specific epithet is derived from the type locality of La Vega.
