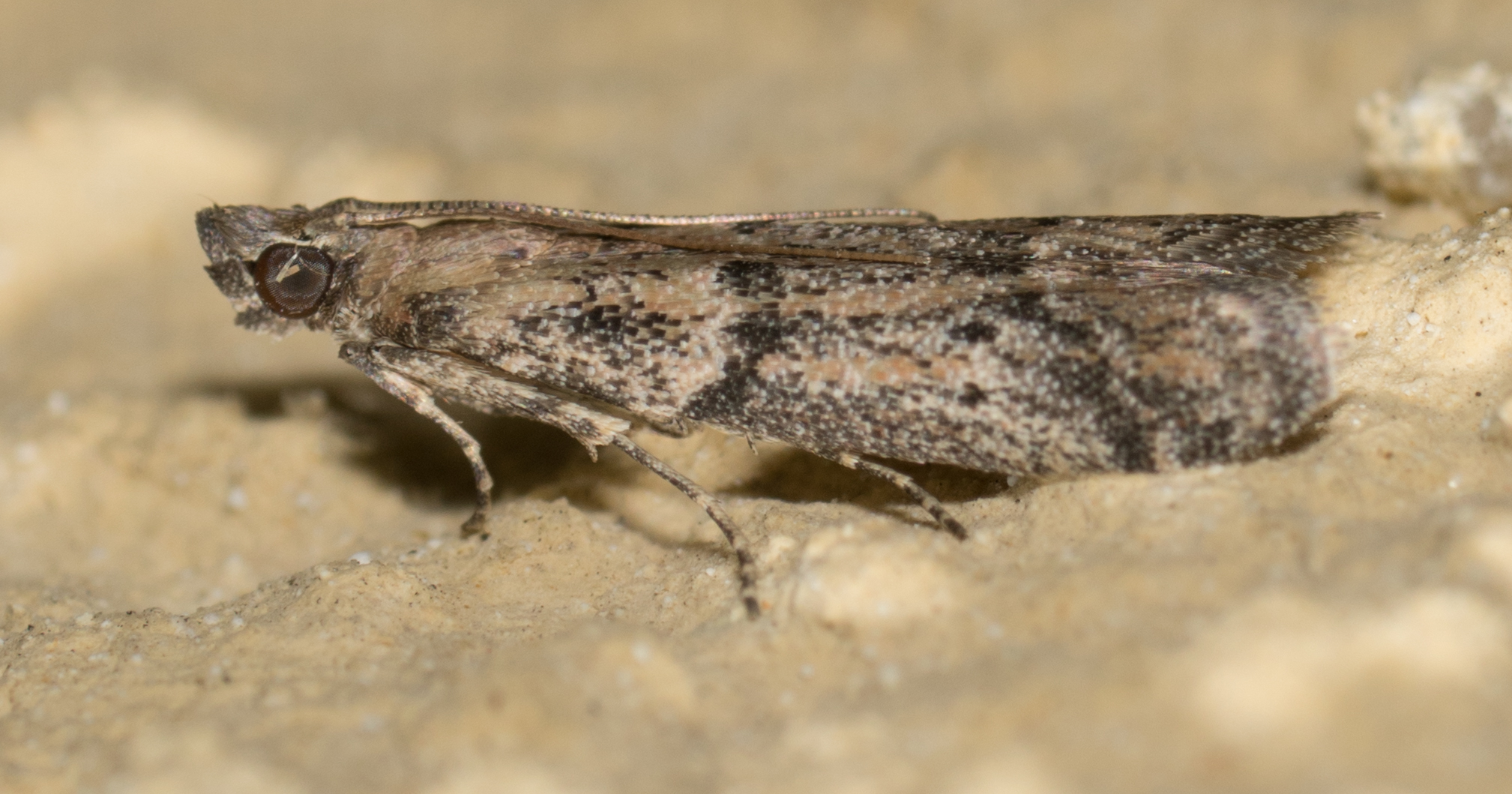

Scientific classification
- Domain: Eukaryota
- Kingdom: Animalia
- Phylum: Arthropoda
- Class: Insecta
- Order: Lepidoptera
- Family: Pyralidae
- Genus: Ephestiodes
- Species: E. gilvescentella

Binomial name
- Ephestiodes gilvescentella Ragonot, 1887

Synonyms
- Ephestiodes nigrella Hulst, 1900

= Ephestiodes gilvescentella =

Species of moth

Ephestiodes gilvescentella, the dusky raisin moth, is a moth of the family Pyralidae. It is native to North America, where it has been recorded from California, Arizona, Oklahoma, Utah, Montana, Alberta and British Columbia. It was introduced to Hawaii by commerce.

The wingspan is 12–16 mm.

The larvae have been recorded feeding on raisins, prunes, walnuts, cones and yeast.
