= Erelieva coca =

Scientific classification
- Kingdom: Animalia
- Phylum: Arthropoda
- Class: Insecta
- Order: Lepidoptera
- Family: Pyralidae
- Genus: Erelieva
- Species: E. coca

Binomial name
- Erelieva coca (Dyar, 1914)

Synonyms
- Eurythmia coca Dyar, 1914; Eurythmia coquilla Dyar, 1914; Eurythmia mossa Dyar, 1914; Eurythmia uncta Dyar, 1914

Species of moth

Erelieva coca is a species of snout moth in the genus Erelieva. It was described by Harrison Gray Dyar Jr. in 1914, and is known from Panama.
