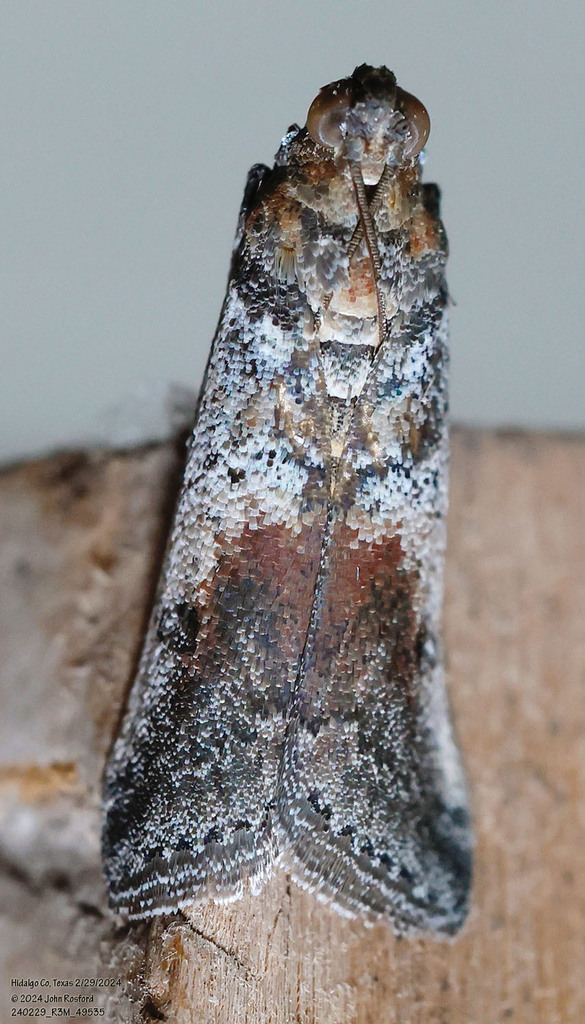

Scientific classification
- Domain: Eukaryota
- Kingdom: Animalia
- Phylum: Arthropoda
- Class: Insecta
- Order: Lepidoptera
- Family: Pyralidae
- Genus: Chararica
- Species: C. hystriculella

Binomial name
- Chararica hystriculella (Hulst, 1889)

Synonyms
- Acrobasis hystriculella Hulst, 1889

= Chararica hystriculella =

Species of moth

Chararica hystriculella is a species of snout moth in the genus Chararica. It was described by George Duryea Hulst in 1889. It is found in the US states of Texas and southern Florida.
