= Caristanius tripartitus =

Scientific classification
- Domain: Eukaryota
- Kingdom: Animalia
- Phylum: Arthropoda
- Class: Insecta
- Order: Lepidoptera
- Family: Pyralidae
- Genus: Caristanius
- Species: C. tripartitus

Binomial name
- Caristanius tripartitus Neunzig, 1996

Species of moth

Caristanius tripartitus is a species of snout moth in the genus Caristanius. It was described by Herbert H. Neunzig in 1996, and is known from the Dominican Republic.
