= Ephestiodes erythrella =

Scientific classification
- Domain: Eukaryota
- Kingdom: Animalia
- Phylum: Arthropoda
- Class: Insecta
- Order: Lepidoptera
- Family: Pyralidae
- Genus: Ephestiodes
- Species: E. erythrella

Binomial name
- Ephestiodes erythrella Ragonot, 1887

Synonyms
- Ephestiodes coloradella (Hulst, 1900); Ephestiodes benjaminella Dyar, 1905

Species of moth

Ephestiodes erythrella is a moth of the family Pyralidae described by Émile Louis Ragonot in 1887. It is native to North America, where it is found from Texas and Ontario westward, including British Columbia, California and Utah. It is an introduced species in Hawaii.

The wingspan is about 13–16 mm.
