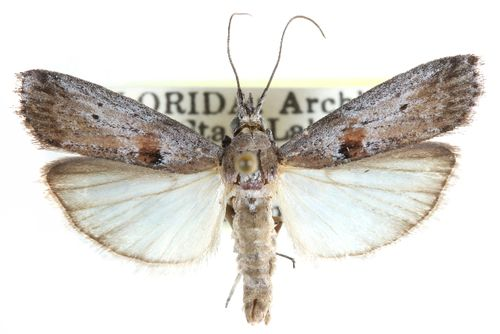

Scientific classification
- Kingdom: Animalia
- Phylum: Arthropoda
- Class: Insecta
- Order: Lepidoptera
- Family: Pyralidae
- Genus: Caristanius
- Species: C. decoloralis

Binomial name
- Caristanius decoloralis (Walker, 1863)

Synonyms
- Trachonitis decoloralis Walker, 1863; Caristanius metagrammalis (Walker, 1863); Caristanius furfurellus (Hulst, 1890); Caristanius floridellus (Hulst, 1893); Caristanius decoralis; Caristanius decorellus

= Caristanius decoloralis =

Species of moth

Caristanius decoloralis is a moth of the family Pyralidae described by Francis Walker in 1863. It is native to North America, where it has been recorded from North Carolina, Florida and eastern Texas. It is an introduced species in Hawaii.
