= Ephestiodes mignonella =

Scientific classification
- Kingdom: Animalia
- Phylum: Arthropoda
- Class: Insecta
- Order: Lepidoptera
- Family: Pyralidae
- Genus: Ephestiodes
- Species: E. mignonella

Binomial name
- Ephestiodes mignonella Dyar, 1908

Species of moth

Ephestiodes mignonella is a species of snout moth in the genus Ephestiodes. It was described by Harrison Gray Dyar Jr. in 1908. It is found in Texas.
