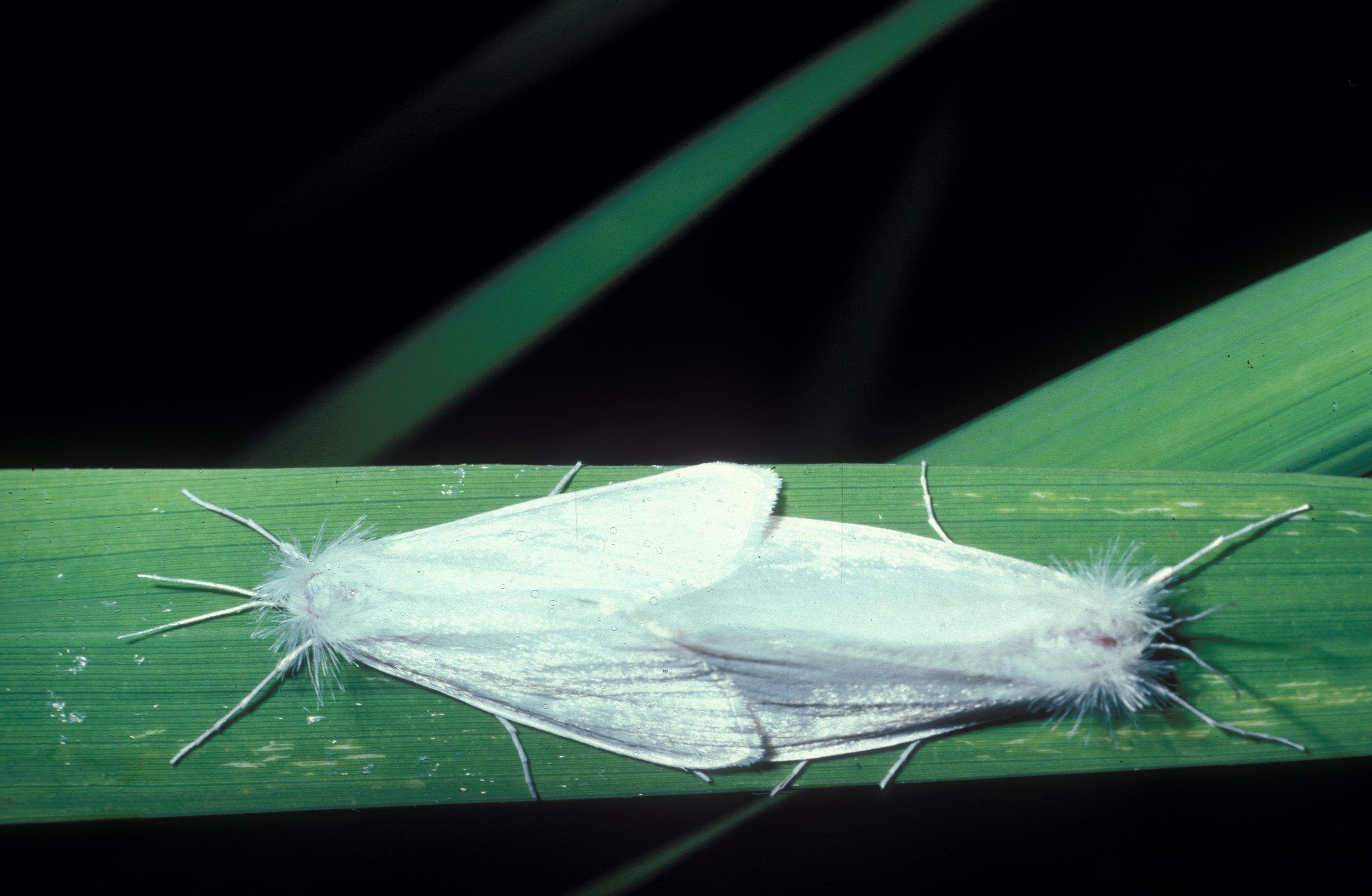

Scientific classification
- Kingdom: Animalia
- Phylum: Arthropoda
- Clade: Pancrustacea
- Class: Insecta
- Order: Lepidoptera
- Family: Crambidae
- Genus: Rupela
- Species: R. albina

Binomial name
- Rupela albina Becker & Solis, 1990

Synonyms
- Rupela albinella (Stoll, [1781]); Phalaena albinella Stoll in Cramer & Stoll, 1781 (preocc. Linnaeus, 1758); Scirpophaga albinella

= Rupela albina =

Species of moth

Rupela albina is a moth of the family Crambidae. It is found in Mexico, Honduras, Guatemala, Nicaragua, Costa Rica, the Guianas, Brazil, Colombia, Ecuador and Peru.

The wingspan is 20–34 mm for males and 27–45 mm for females. The wings are white.
