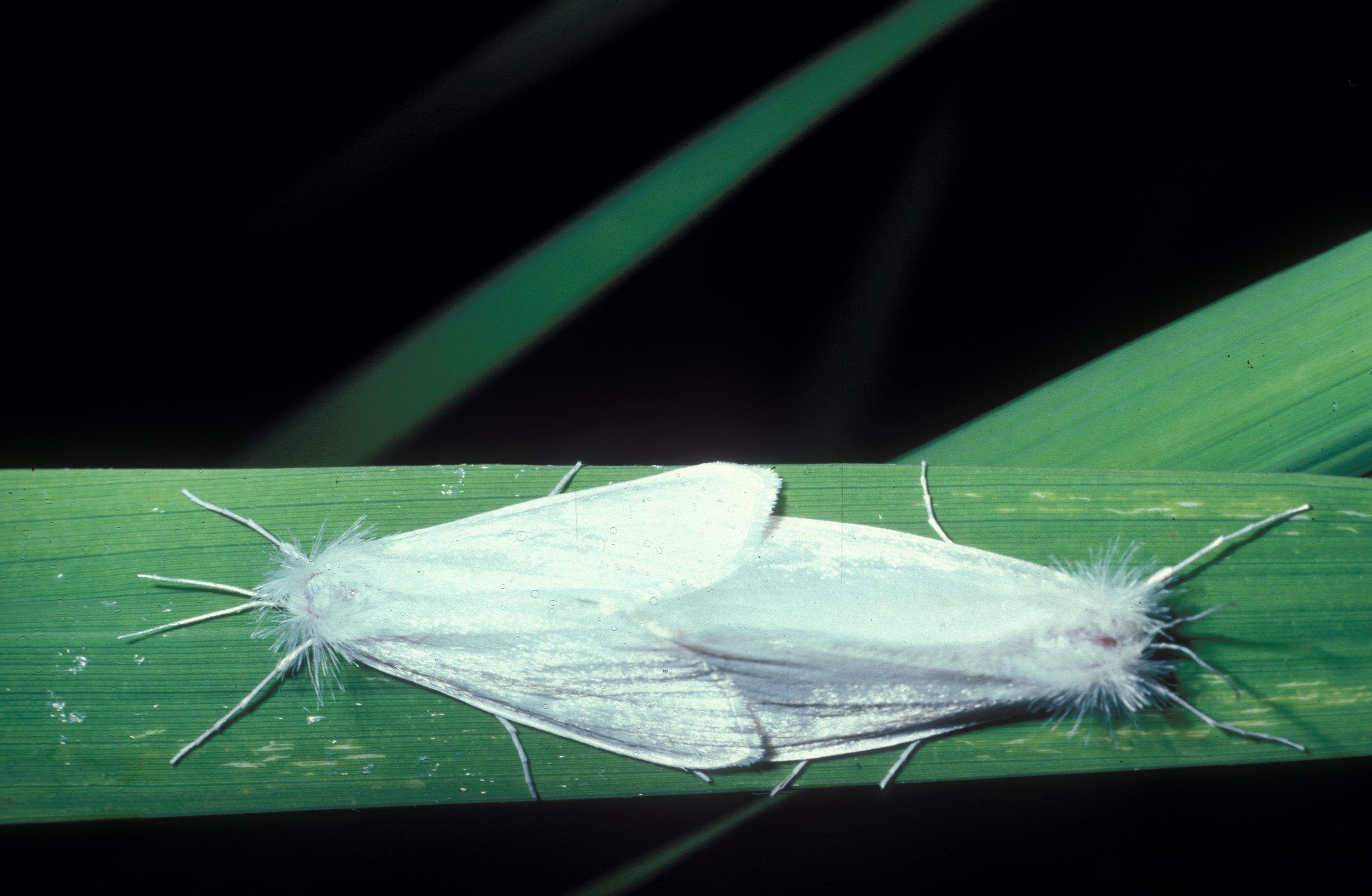
- Rupela albina

Scientific classification
- Domain: Eukaryota
- Kingdom: Animalia
- Phylum: Arthropoda
- Class: Insecta
- Order: Lepidoptera
- Family: Crambidae
- Subfamily: Schoenobiinae
- Genus: Rupela; Walker, 1863

Synonyms
- Storteria Barnes & McDunnough, 1913

= Rupela =

Genus of moths

Rupela is a genus of moths of the family Crambidae.

== Species ==
- Rupela adunca Heinrich, 1937
- Rupela albina Becker & Solis, 1990
- Rupela antonia Heinrich, 1937
- Rupela bendis Heinrich, 1937
- Rupela candace Heinrich, 1937
- Rupela canens Heinrich, 1937
- Rupela cornigera Heinrich, 1937
- Rupela drusilla Heinrich, 1937
- Rupela edusa Heinrich, 1937
- Rupela faustina Heinrich, 1937
- Rupela gaia Heinrich, 1937
- Rupela gibbera Heinrich, 1937
- Rupela herie Heinrich, 1937
- Rupela horridula Heinrich, 1937
- Rupela imitativa Heinrich, 1937
- Rupela jana Heinrich, 1937
- Rupela labeosa Heinrich, 1937
- Rupela lara Heinrich, 1937
- Rupela leucatea (Zeller, 1863)
- Rupela liberta Heinrich, 1937
- Rupela lumaria Heinrich, 1937
- Rupela maenas Heinrich, 1937
- Rupela monstrata Heinrich, 1937
- Rupela nereis Heinrich, 1937
- Rupela nivea Walker, 1863
- Rupela orbona Heinrich, 1937
- Rupela pallidula Heinrich, 1937
- Rupela procula Heinrich, 1937
- Rupela saetigera Heinrich, 1937
- Rupela scitula Heinrich, 1937
- Rupela segrega Heinrich, 1937
- Rupela sejuncta Heinrich, 1937
- Rupela spinifera Heinrich, 1937
- Rupela tinctella Walker, 1863
- Rupela vexativa Heinrich, 1937
