= Fulrada carpasella =

Scientific classification
- Kingdom: Animalia
- Phylum: Arthropoda
- Class: Insecta
- Order: Lepidoptera
- Family: Pyralidae
- Genus: Fulrada
- Species: F. carpasella

Binomial name
- Fulrada carpasella (Schaus, 1923)

Synonyms
- Piesmopoda carpasella Schaus, 1923

Species of moth

Fulrada carpasella is a species of snout moth in the genus Fulrada. It was described by the American entomologist William Schaus in 1923 from specimens collected in the Galapagos Islands. The species is recognized for its flower-boring behavior, observed particularly on Santiago Island in April. Distinctive anatomical features described by Schaus include unique scale patterns and structures on the abdomen, which help distinguish this species from others.
