= Fulrada querna =

Scientific classification
- Kingdom: Animalia
- Phylum: Arthropoda
- Class: Insecta
- Order: Lepidoptera
- Family: Pyralidae
- Genus: Fulrada
- Species: F. querna

Binomial name
- Fulrada querna (Dyar, 1914)

Synonyms
- Dasypyga querna Dyar, 1914

Species of moth

Fulrada querna is a species of snout moth in the genus Fulrada. It was described by Harrison Gray Dyar Jr. in 1914. It is found in Panama.
