= Rupela leucatea =

Scientific classification
- Kingdom: Animalia
- Phylum: Arthropoda
- Clade: Pancrustacea
- Class: Insecta
- Order: Lepidoptera
- Family: Crambidae
- Genus: Rupela
- Species: R. leucatea

Binomial name
- Rupela leucatea (Zeller, 1863)

Synonyms
- Scirpophaga leucatea Zeller, 1863; Scirpophaga longicornis Möschler, 1890

Species of moth

Rupela leucatea is a moth in the family Crambidae. It was described by Philipp Christoph Zeller in 1863. It is found in Puerto Rico, Jamaica, Cuba, Hispaniola, Martinique, Antigua, Mexico, Guatemala, Nicaragua, Panama, Honduras, Trinidad, Venezuela, the Guianas, Brazil, Argentina, Paraguay and Peru.

The wingspan is 22–38 mm for males and 25–53 mm for females. The wings are shining white.

The larvae feed on Echinochloa polystachya.
