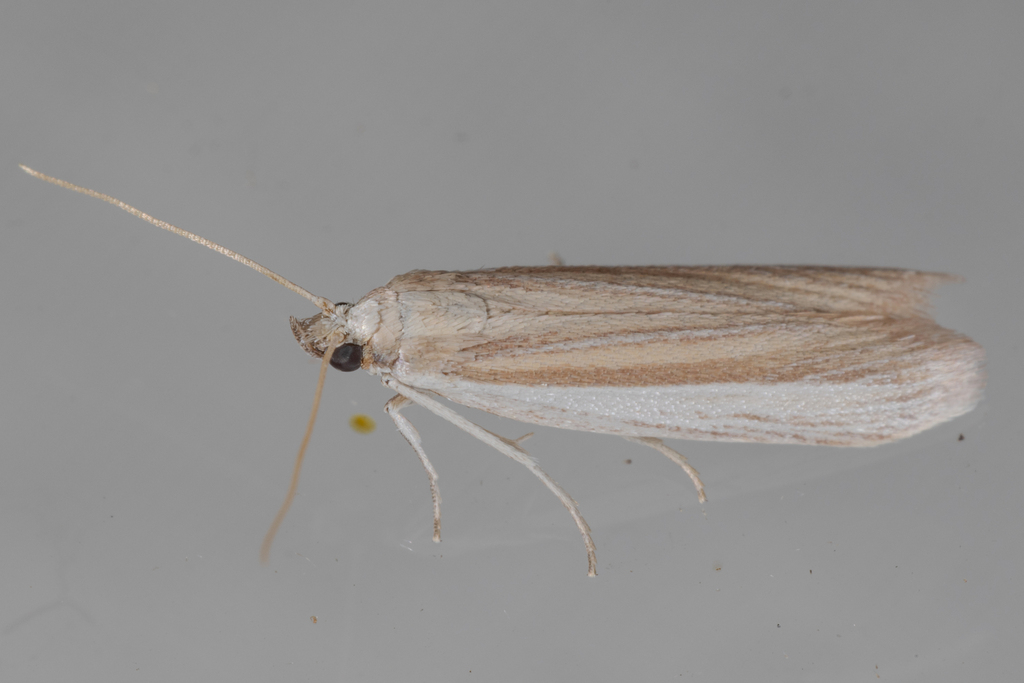

Scientific classification
- Domain: Eukaryota
- Kingdom: Animalia
- Phylum: Arthropoda
- Class: Insecta
- Order: Lepidoptera
- Family: Pyralidae
- Genus: Anderida
- Species: A. peorinella

Binomial name
- Anderida peorinella Blanchard & Knudson, 1985

= Anderida peorinella =

Species of moth

Anderida peorinella is a species of snout moth in the genus Anderida. It was described by André Blanchard and Edward C. Knudson in 1985 and is from Texas, United States.

The length of the forewings is 8.1–11.2 mm for males and about 12.5 mm for females.
