= Caristanius guatemalella =

Scientific classification
- Kingdom: Animalia
- Phylum: Arthropoda
- Class: Insecta
- Order: Lepidoptera
- Family: Pyralidae
- Genus: Caristanius
- Species: C. guatemalella

Binomial name
- Caristanius guatemalella (Ragonot, 1888)

Synonyms
- Salehria guatemalella Ragonot, 1888

Species of moth

Caristanius guatemalella is a species of snout moth in the genus Caristanius. It was described by Émile Louis Ragonot in 1888. It is found in Guatemala.
