= Ephestiodes noniella =

Scientific classification
- Kingdom: Animalia
- Phylum: Arthropoda
- Class: Insecta
- Order: Lepidoptera
- Family: Pyralidae
- Genus: Ephestiodes
- Species: E. noniella

Binomial name
- Ephestiodes noniella Dyar, 1914

Species of moth

Ephestiodes noniella is a species of snout moth in the genus Ephestiodes. It was described by Harrison Gray Dyar Jr. in 1914, and is known from Panama.
