= Carl Heinrich =

American entomologist

Wilhelm Carl Paul Gottlieb Heinrich (7 April 1880 in Newark, New York – 31 May 1955 in Washington, D.C.) was an American entomologist.

== Life ==
He studied Greek and drama at the University of Chicago, he moved to Washington D.C., in 1902, where he worked in business. In 1908, he went to New York to study music. Heinrich moved back to Washington and in 1913 joined the United States Department of Agriculture. He initially worked on applied entomology but later switched to specialize in the study of Lepidoptera.

He was editor of the Proceedings of the Entomological Society of Washington from 1924 to 1926.

== See also ==
- Category:Taxa named by Carl Heinrich
