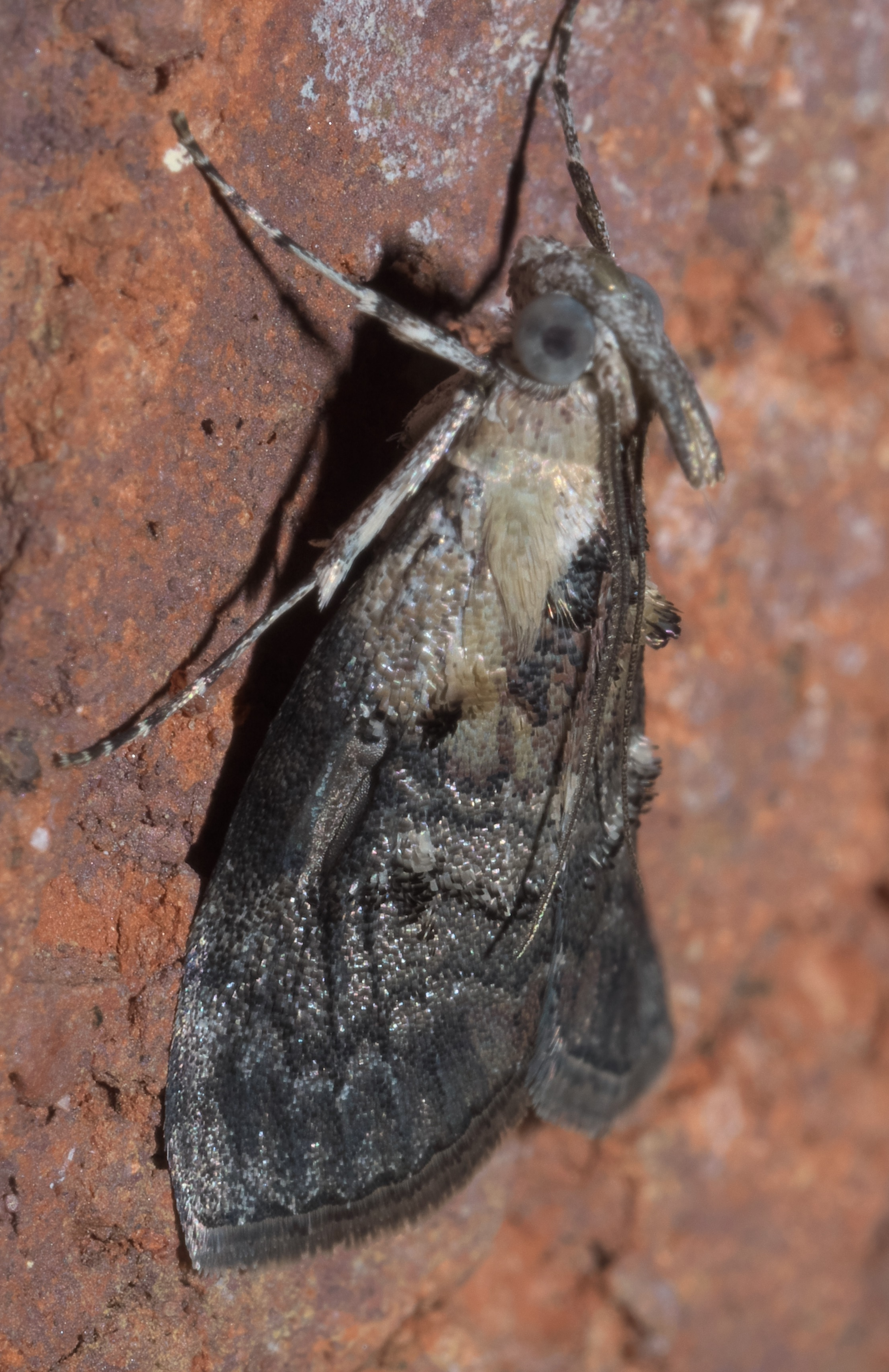

Scientific classification
- Kingdom: Animalia
- Phylum: Arthropoda
- Clade: Pancrustacea
- Class: Insecta
- Order: Lepidoptera
- Family: Pyralidae
- Subfamily: Epipaschiinae
- Genus: Pococera; Zeller, 1848

Synonyms
- Attacapa Hulst, 1889; Auradisa Walker, 1866; Benta Walker, 1863; Hemimatia Lederer, 1863; Katona Hulst, 1888; Lanthaphe Clemens, 1860; Lanthape Hulst, 1903; Loma Hulst, 1888; Saluda Hulst, 1888; Tetralopha Zeller, 1848; Tioga Hulst, 1888; Afra Ghesquière, 1942; Wanda Hulst, 1888

= Pococera =

Genus of moths

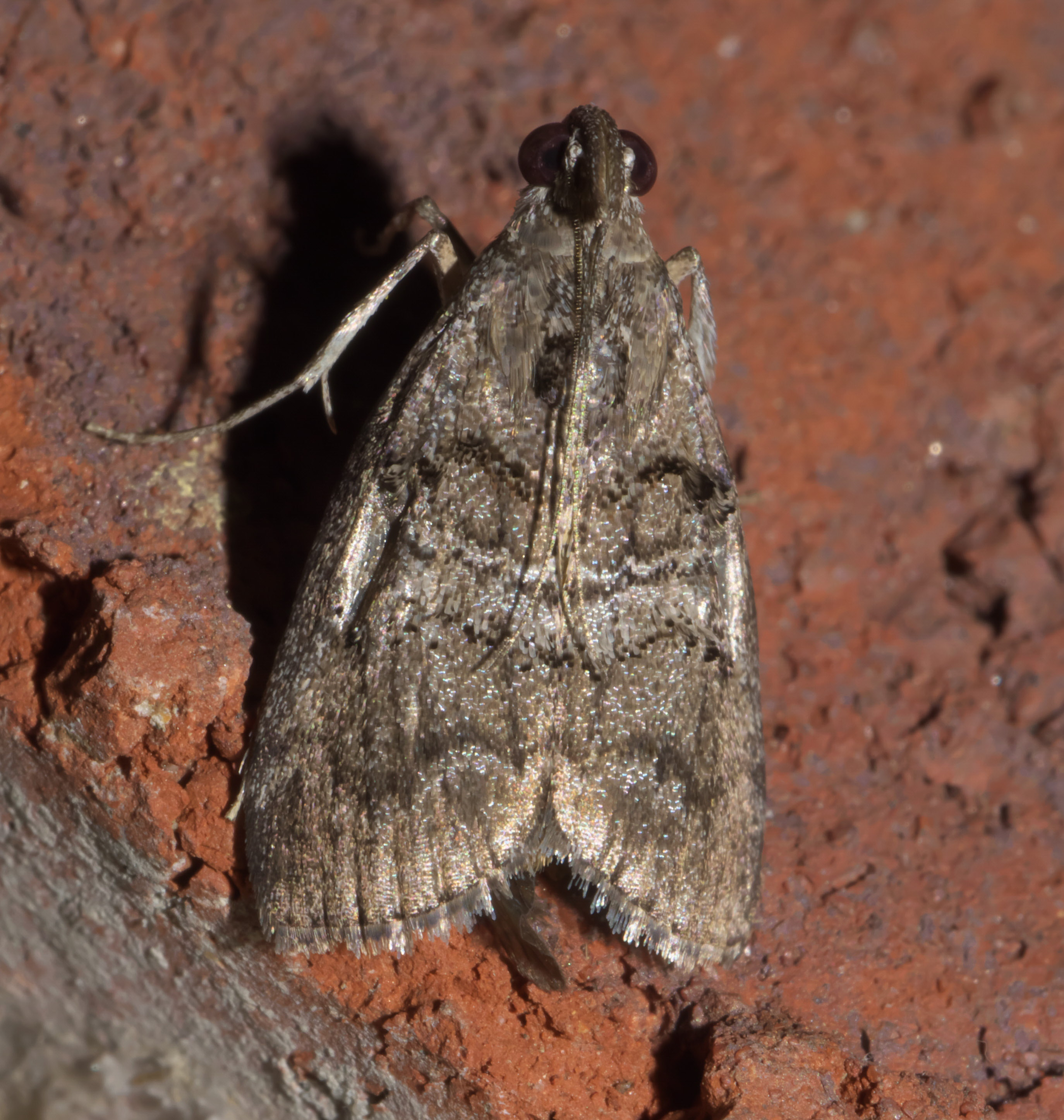
Pococera asperatella, maple webworm

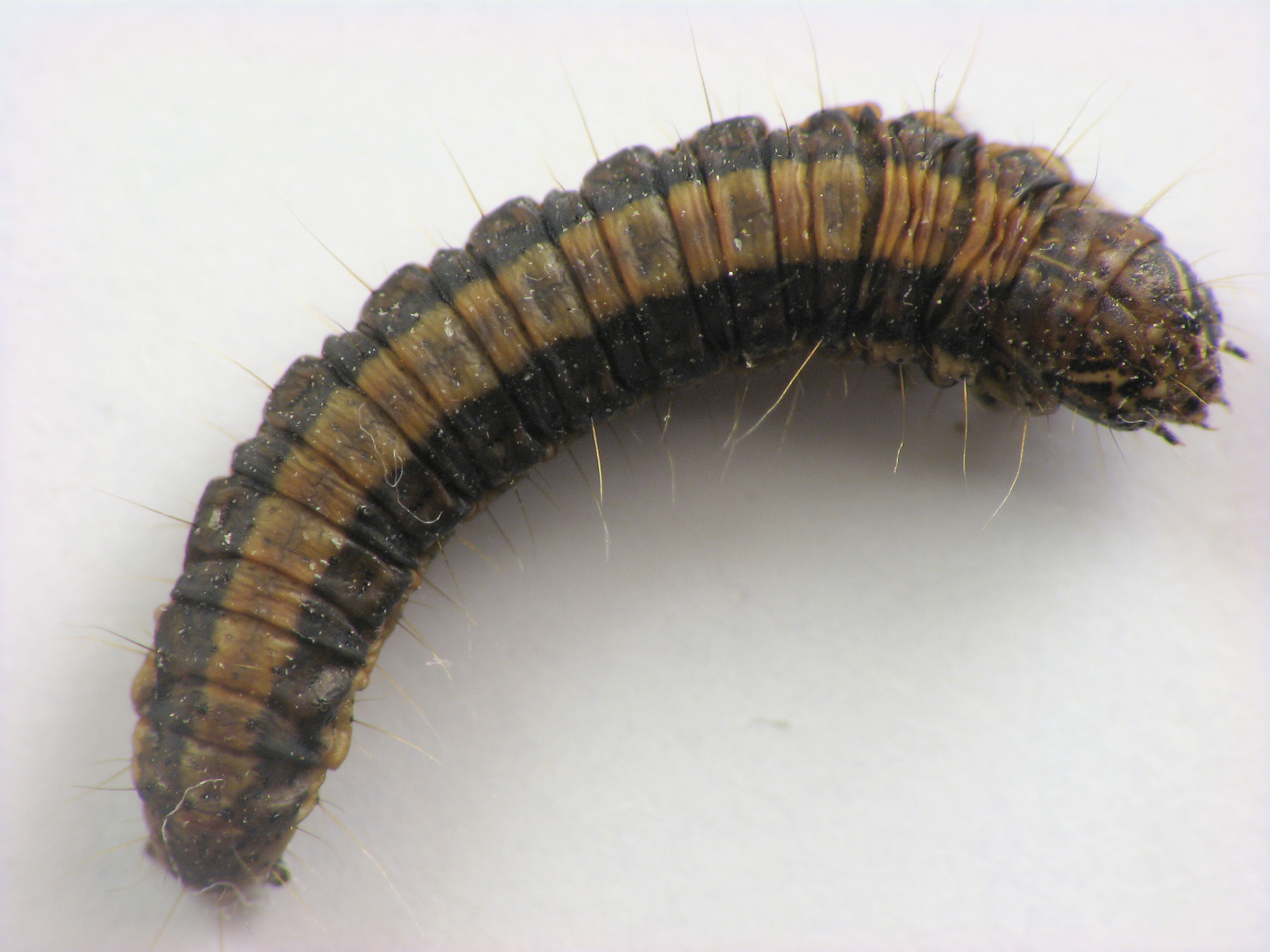
Caterpillar of Pococera species on sweetgum

Pococera is a genus of snout moths in the subfamily Epipaschiinae, found mainly in North and Central America. It was described by Philipp Christoph Zeller in 1848.

== Species ==
These 86 species belong to the genus Pococera:

- Pococera adolescens Dyar, 1914
- Pococera aelredella Schaus, 1922
- Pococera africalis Hampson, 1906
- Pococera agatha Schaus, 1922
- Pococera albiceps Hampson, 1906
- Pococera albimedium Schaus
- Pococera albulella Hampson, 1896
- Pococera antilocha Meyrick, 1936
- Pococera aplastella Hulst, 1888 (aspen webworm)
- Pococera arizonella Barnes & Benjamin, 1924
- Pococera asperatella (Clemens, 1860) (maple webworm)
- Pococera atristrigella Ragonot, 1893
- Pococera baptisiella Fernald, 1887
- Pococera baradata Schaus
- Pococera basalis E. D. Jones, 1912
- Pococera basigera Dyar
- Pococera basilissa Schaus, 1922
- Pococera beroella Schaus
- Pococera callipeplella Hulst, 1888
- Pococera capnodon Dyar, 1914
- Pococera cataldusa Schaus, 1925
- Pococera chrysoderas Dyar
- Pococera corumba Schaus, 1922
- Pococera crinita Schaus
- Pococera cuthmana Schaus, 1922
- Pococera cyrilla Schaus, 1922
- Pococera dolorosella Barnes & Benjamin, 1924
- Pococera elegans Schaus
- Pococera euphemella Hulst, 1888 (mesquite leaf tier)
- Pococera expandens (Walker, 1863) (double-humped pococera moth)
- Pococera febianalis Schaus
- Pococera floridella Hulst, 1900
- Pococera fuscolotella Ragonot, 1888 (syn: Salebria nigricans Hulst, 1900)
- Pococera gelidalis Walker [1866]
- Pococera gibbella Zeller, 1848
- Pococera griseella Barnes & Benjamin, 1924
- Pococera gybriana Schaus, 1925
- Pococera hemimelas Hampson, 1906
- Pococera hermasalis Schaus, 1925
- Pococera humerella Ragonot, 1888
- Pococera insularella Möschler
- Pococera internigralis Dognin, 1909
- Pococera iogalis Schaus, 1922
- Pococera irrorata Schaus
- Pococera jovita Schaus, 1922 (misspelling jovira)
- Pococera lamonti Schaus
- Pococera limalis Schaus
- Pococera maritimalis McDunnough, 1939
- Pococera marmorata Schaus
- Pococera marthusa Schaus
- Pococera melanogrammos Zeller, 1872 (black-letter pococera moth)
- Pococera mesoleucalis Hampson, 1916
- Pococera militella Zeller, 1848 (sycamore webworm)
- Pococera narthusa Schaus, 1913
- Pococera nepomuca Schaus, 1925
- Pococera nigribasalis Hampson, 1906
- Pococera nigrilunalis Dognin
- Pococera noctuina Schaus
- Pococera nocturna Schaus, 1922
- Pococera notabilis Schaus
- Pococera olivescens Schaus
- Pococera pallidifusa Dognin
- Pococera platanella Clemens, 1860
- Pococera polialis Hampson, 1906
- Pococera provoella Barnes & Benjamin, 1924
- Pococera robustella Zeller, 1848 (pine webworm)
- Pococera sabbasa Schaus, 1922
- Pococera sadotha Schaus, 1922
- Pococera scabridella Ragonot, 1888
- Pococera scortealis Lederer, 1863 (white-aproned pococera moth)
- Pococera semnialis (C. Felder, R. Felder & Rogenhofer, 1875)
- Pococera spaldingella Barnes & Benjamin, 1924
- Pococera speciosella Hulst, 1900
- Pococera sphaeraphora Dyar
- Pococera stenipteralis Hampson
- Pococera subcanalis Walker, 1863 (cloaked pococera moth)
- Pococera subviolascens Hampson, 1906
- Pococera tertiella Dyar
- Pococera texanella Ragonot, 1888
- Pococera thoracicella Barnes & Benjamin, 1924
- Pococera tiltella Hulst, 1888
- Pococera vacciniivora Munroe, 1963
- Pococera vandella Dyar, 1914
- Pococera vedastella Schaus
- Pococera venezuelensis Amsel
- Pococera viridis Druce, 1910
