= Mediavia =

Scientific classification
- Kingdom: Animalia
- Phylum: Arthropoda
- Clade: Pancrustacea
- Class: Insecta
- Order: Lepidoptera
- Family: Pyralidae
- Subfamily: Epipaschiinae
- Genus: Mediavia; Solis, 1993

Type species
- Jocara discalis Hampson, 1906

Genus of moths

Mediavia is a genus of snout moths erected by Maria Alma Solis in 1993.

== Species ==
Original genus follows the author citation:

- Mediavia aciusa (Schaus, 1925) (Macalla)
- Mediavia agnesa (Schaus, 1925) (Tetralopha)
- Mediavia bevnoa (Schaus, 1925) (Stericta)
- Mediavia discalis (Hampson, 1906) (Jocara)
- Mediavia dissimilis (Warren, 1891) (Roeseliodes)
- Mediavia eadberti (Schaus, 1925) (Stericta)
- Mediavia emerantia (Schaus, 1922) (Stericta)
- Mediavia glaucinalis (Hampson, 1906) (Stericta)
  - Synonym: M. paschasia (Schaus, 1925) (Stericta)
- Mediavia grenvilalis (Schaus, 1934 (Jocara)
- Mediavia hermengilda (Schaus, 1925 (Stericta)
- Mediavia ildefonsa (Schaus, 1922) (Stericta)
- Mediavia internigralis (Dognin, 1909) (Pococera)
- Mediavia longistriga (Schaus, 1922) (Jocara)
  - Synonym: M. comgalla (Schaus, 1925) (Stericta)
- Mediavia phaebadia (Schaus, 1925) (Stericta)
- Mediavia vimina (Schaus, 1922) (Jocara)
