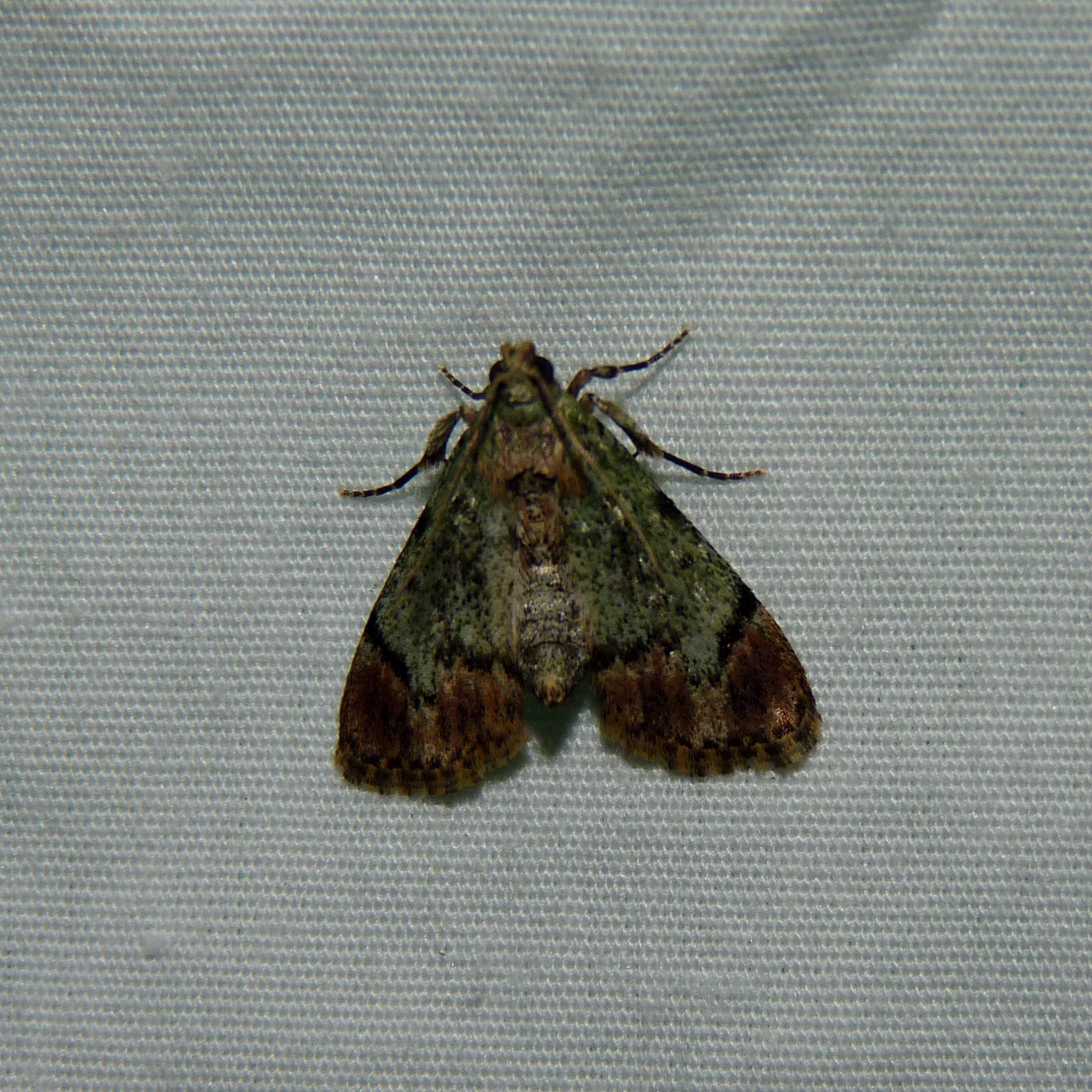
- Macalla superatalis

Scientific classification
- Domain: Eukaryota
- Kingdom: Animalia
- Phylum: Arthropoda
- Class: Insecta
- Order: Lepidoptera
- Family: Pyralidae
- Subfamily: Epipaschiinae
- Genus: Macalla; Walker, 1859

Synonyms
- Aradrapha Walker, 1866; Magalla Mathew, 2006 (missp.); Mochlocera Grote, 1876; Pseudomacalla Dognin, 1908; Salma Walker, 1863

= Macalla (moth) =

Genus of moths

Macalla is a genus of snout moths. It was described by Francis Walker in 1859.

== Species ==
- Macalla albifurcalis Hampson, 1916 (India)
- Macalla arctata (Druce, 1902)
- Macalla atrincinctalis Hampson, 1916 (India)
- Macalla brachyscopalis Hampson, 1912 (India)
- Macalla carbonifera (Meyrick, 1932) (India)
- Macalla chosenalis Shibuya, 1927
- Macalla dimidialis (Snellen, 1890) (India)
- Macalla eumictalis Hampson, 1912 (India)
- Macalla exrufescens Hampson, 1896 (India)
- Macalla fasciculata Hampson, 1906
- Macalla finstanalis Schaus, 1922
- Macalla hyalinalis Amsel, 1956
- Macalla hypnonalis Hampson, 1896 (India)
- Macalla hypoxantha Hampson, 1896
- Macalla madegassalis Viette, 1960 (Madagascar)
- Macalla mesoleucalis Hampson, 1916 (India)
- Macalla metasarcia Hampson, 1903 (India)
- Macalla mixtalis Walker, [1866]
- Macalla nauplialis Walker, 1859
- Macalla nebulosa Schaus, 1912
- Macalla niveorufa Hampson, 1906
- Macalla noctuipalpis (Dognin, 1908)
- Macalla nubilalis (Hampson, 1893) (India)
- Macalla ochroalis Hampson, 1916 (India)
- Macalla pallidomedia Dyar, 1910
- Macalla parvula Hampson, 1896 (India)
- Macalla phaeobasalis Hampson, 1916 (India)
- Macalla plicatalis Hampson, 1903 (India)
- Macalla regalis E. D. Jones, 1912
- Macalla rufibarbalis Hampson, 1903
- Macalla rufitinctalis (Warren, 1896)
- Macalla scoporhyncha Hampson, 1896
- Macalla seyrigalis Marion & Viette, 1956 (Madagascar)
- Macalla thyrsisalis Walker, [1859]
- Macalla zelleri (Grote, 1876)
