= Macalla finstanalis =

Scientific classification
- Domain: Eukaryota
- Kingdom: Animalia
- Phylum: Arthropoda
- Class: Insecta
- Order: Lepidoptera
- Family: Pyralidae
- Genus: Macalla
- Species: M. finstanalis

Binomial name
- Macalla finstanalis Schaus, 1922

Synonyms
- Macalla vulstana Schaus, 1922

Species of moth

Macalla finstanalis is a species of snout moth in the genus Macalla. It was described by Schaus in 1922. It is found in Guatemala and Peru.
