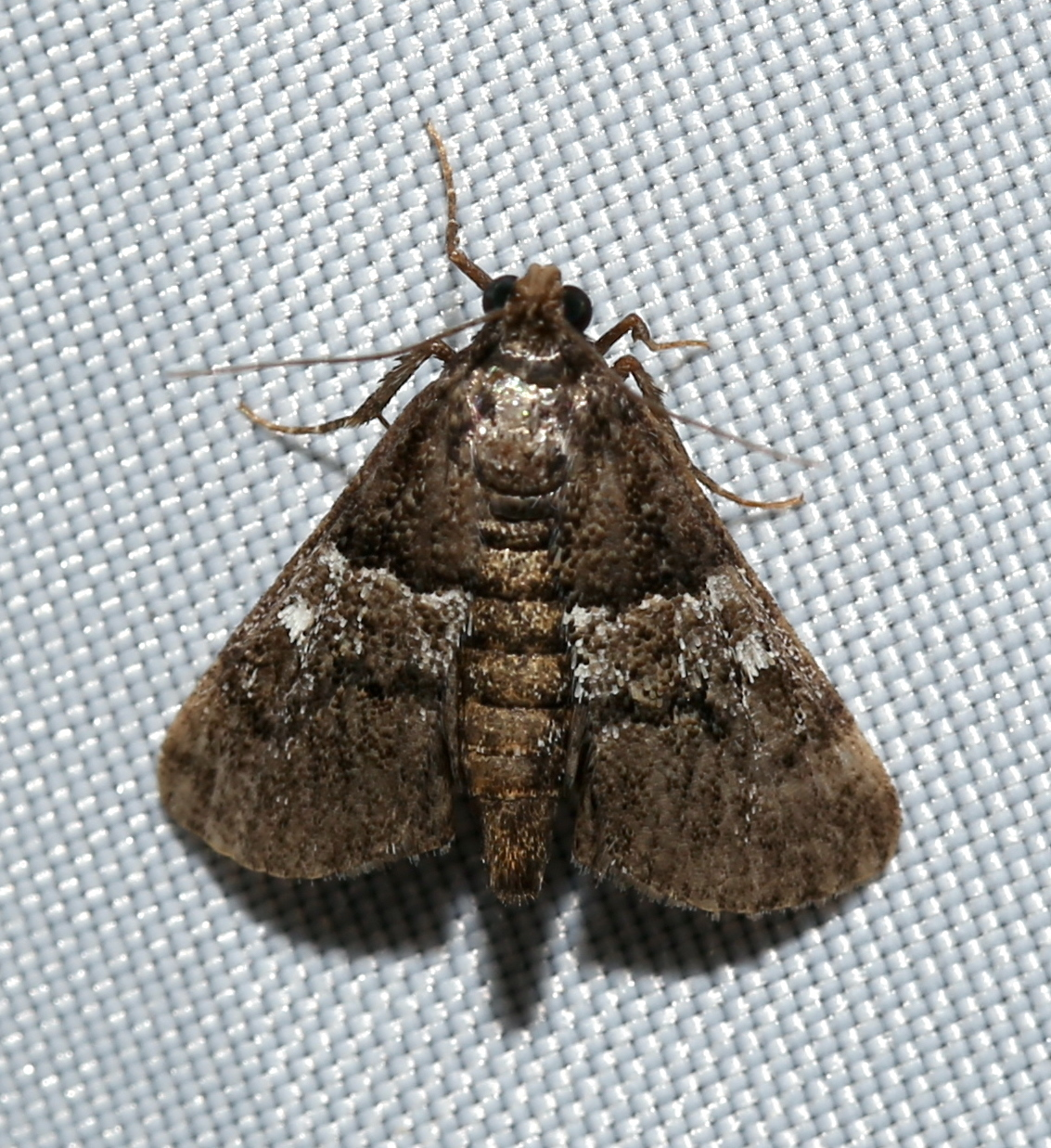

Scientific classification
- Kingdom: Animalia
- Phylum: Arthropoda
- Class: Insecta
- Order: Lepidoptera
- Family: Pyralidae
- Genus: Macalla
- Species: M. zelleri

Binomial name
- Macalla zelleri (Grote, 1876)

Synonyms
- Mochlocera zelleri Grote, 1876; Pococera zelleri

= Macalla zelleri =

Species of moth

Macalla zelleri, or Zeller's epipaschia moth, is a species of snout moth in the genus Macalla. It was described by Augustus Radcliffe Grote in 1876. It is found from Ontario and New Jersey to Florida and west to Arizona and Minnesota.

The larvae feed on Rhus radicans. They have a yellow body and light red head with pale freckles.
