= Macalla nauplialis =

Scientific classification
- Kingdom: Animalia
- Phylum: Arthropoda
- Class: Insecta
- Order: Lepidoptera
- Family: Pyralidae
- Genus: Macalla
- Species: M. nauplialis

Binomial name
- Macalla nauplialis Walker, 1859

Synonyms
- Pyralis nauplialis; Pyralis porphyralis; Acrobasis subcultella

Species of moth

Macalla nauplialis is a species of moth of the family Pyralidae. It is found in Australia.
