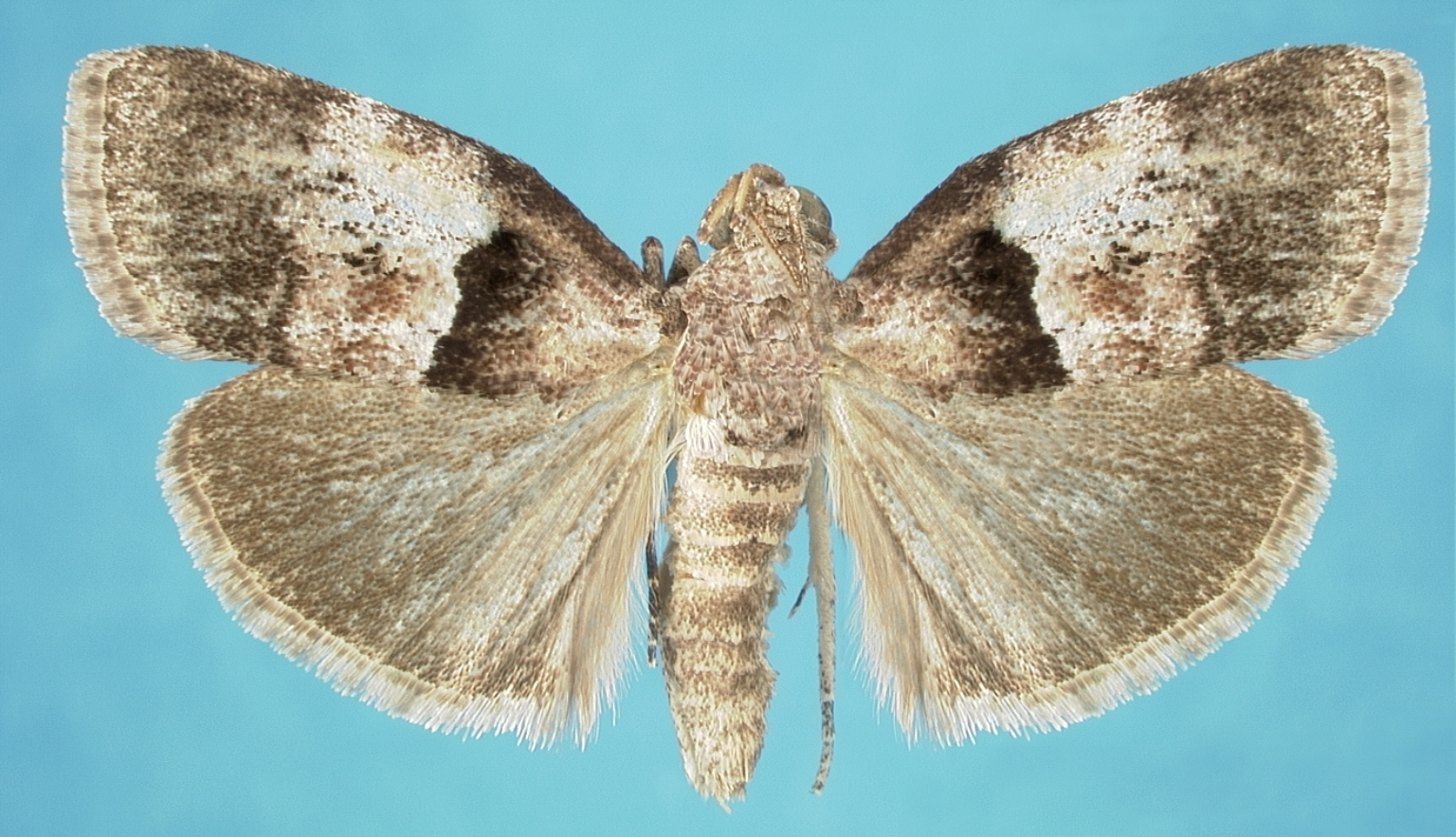

Scientific classification
- Kingdom: Animalia
- Phylum: Arthropoda
- Clade: Pancrustacea
- Class: Insecta
- Order: Lepidoptera
- Family: Pyralidae
- Genus: Pococera
- Species: P. robustella

Binomial name
- Pococera robustella (Zeller, 1848)

Synonyms
- Tetralopha robustella Zeller, 1848; Tetralopha diluculella Grote, 1880

= Pococera robustella =

Species of moth

Pococera robustella, the pine webworm moth, is a species of moth of the family Pyralidae. It is found in southern Canada and the eastern United States from Minnesota to New England and south to Florida.

The larvae feed on the needles of various Pinus species.

== Gallery ==
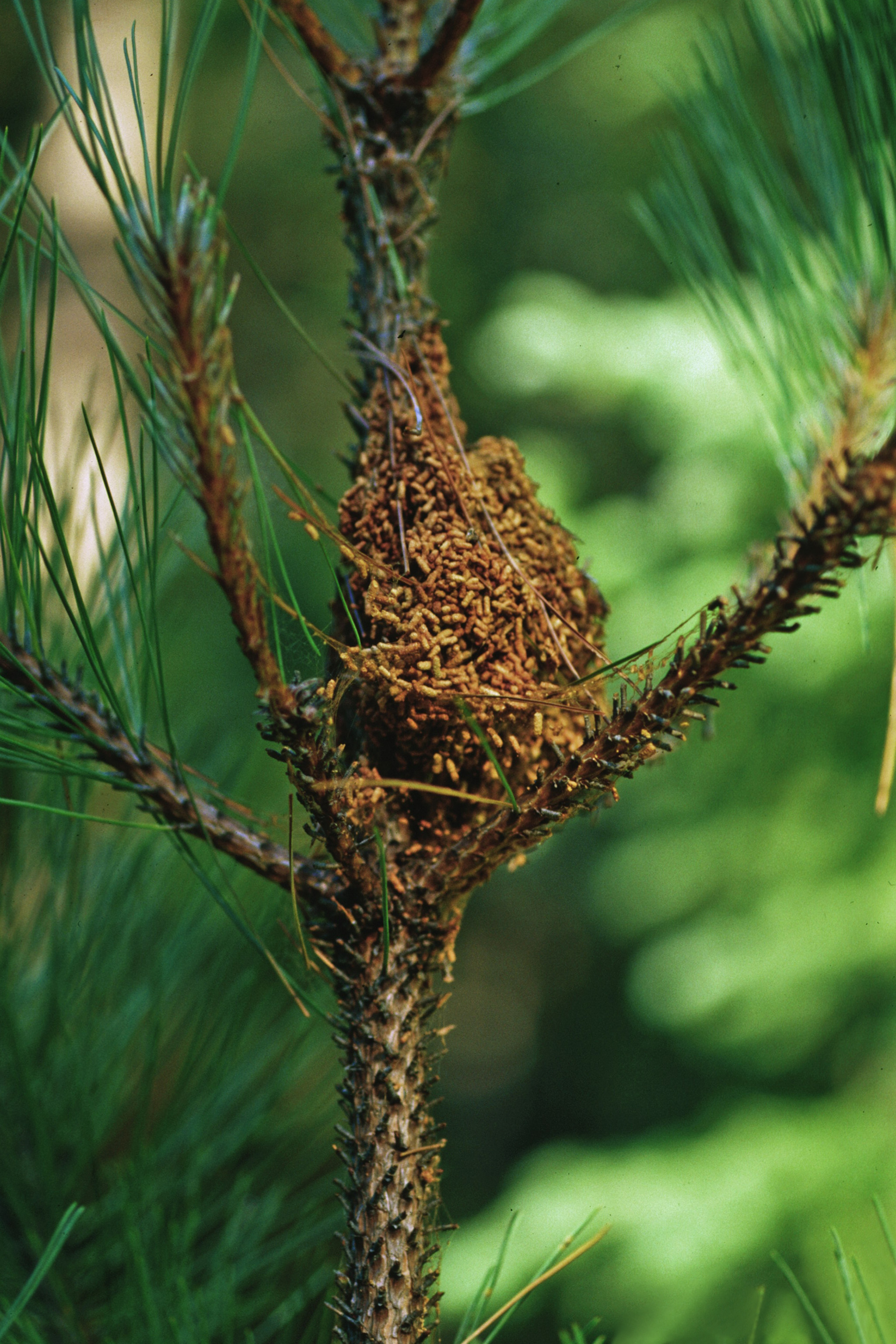
Larvae

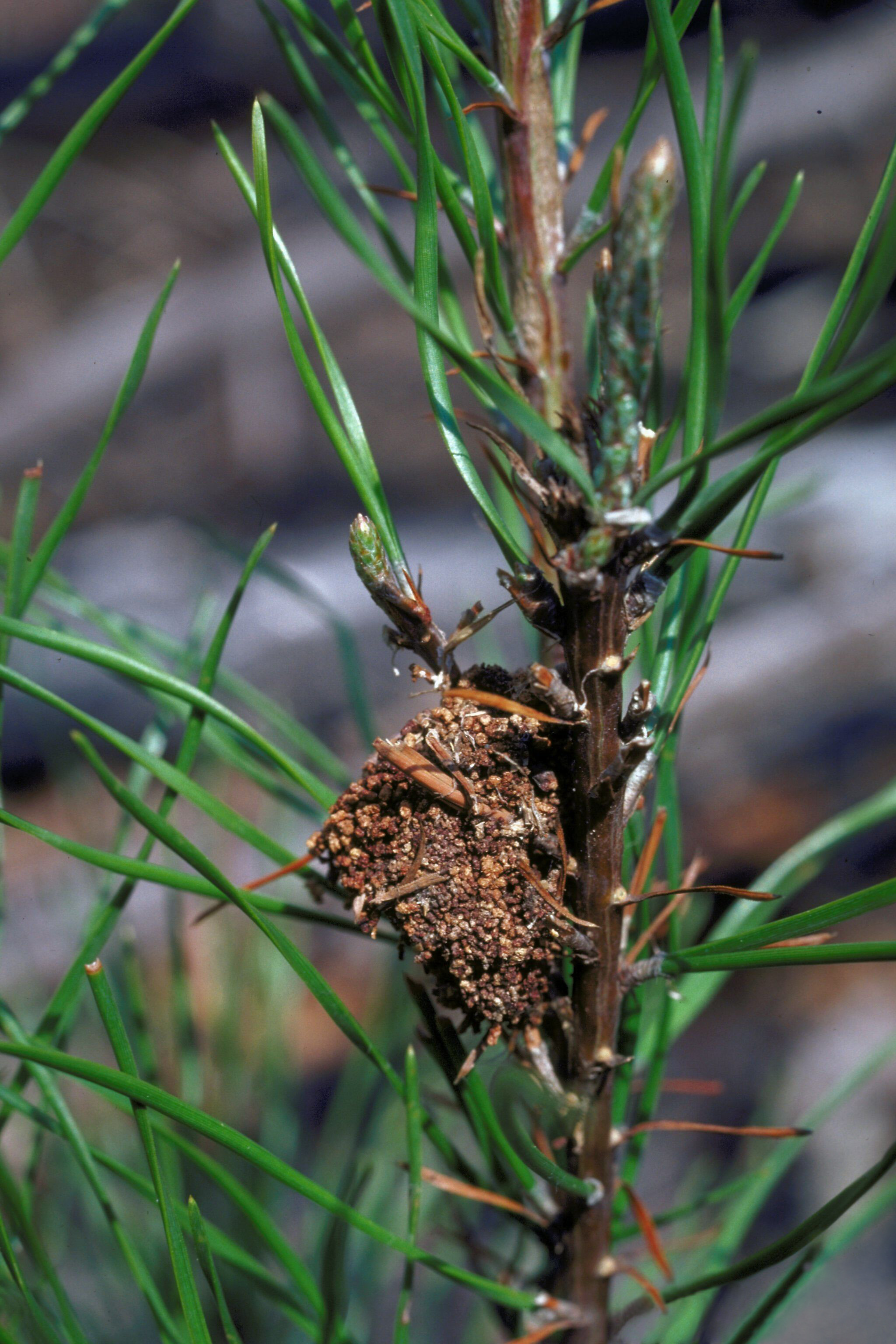
Damage

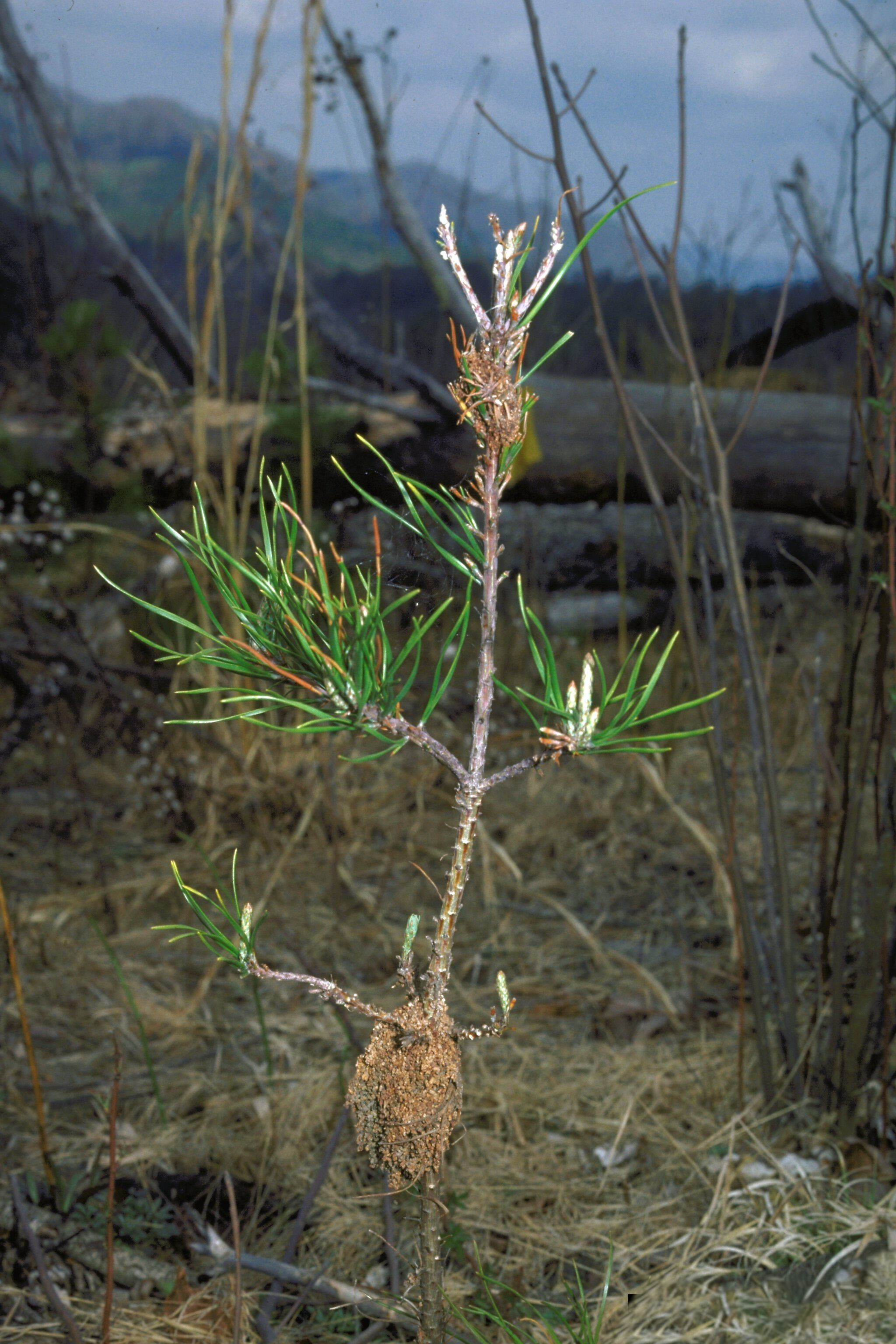
Damage
