= Macalla madegassalis =

Scientific classification
- Kingdom: Animalia
- Phylum: Arthropoda
- Class: Insecta
- Order: Lepidoptera
- Family: Pyralidae
- Genus: Macalla
- Species: M. madegassalis

Binomial name
- Macalla madegassalis Viette, 1960

Species of moth

Macalla madegassalis is a species of snout moth in the genus Macalla. It was described by Viette in 1960, and is known from Madagascar.
