= Macalla hypoxantha =

Scientific classification
- Kingdom: Animalia
- Phylum: Arthropoda
- Class: Insecta
- Order: Lepidoptera
- Family: Pyralidae
- Genus: Macalla
- Species: M. hypoxantha

Binomial name
- Macalla hypoxantha Hampson, 1896

Species of moth

Macalla hypoxantha is a species of snout moth in the genus Macalla. It was described by George Hampson in 1896 and is known from India, including Sikkim.
