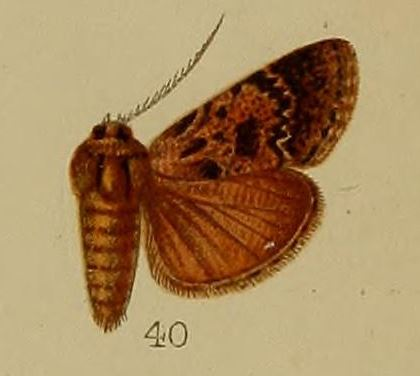

Scientific classification
- Kingdom: Animalia
- Phylum: Arthropoda
- Class: Insecta
- Order: Lepidoptera
- Family: Pyralidae
- Genus: Macalla
- Species: M. eumictalis

Binomial name
- Macalla eumictalis Hampson, 1912

= Macalla eumictalis =

Species of moth

Macalla eumictalis is a species of snout moth in the genus Macalla. This moth is known from Sri Lanka and India.

The adults have a wingspan of 34mm for the males and 40mm for the females.
