= Macalla hyalinalis =

Scientific classification
- Domain: Eukaryota
- Kingdom: Animalia
- Phylum: Arthropoda
- Class: Insecta
- Order: Lepidoptera
- Family: Pyralidae
- Genus: Macalla
- Species: M. hyalinalis

Binomial name
- Macalla hyalinalis Amsel, 1956

Species of moth

Macalla hyalinalis is a species of snout moth in the genus Macalla. It was described by Hans Georg Amsel in 1956 and is known from Venezuela (including Maracay, the type location).
