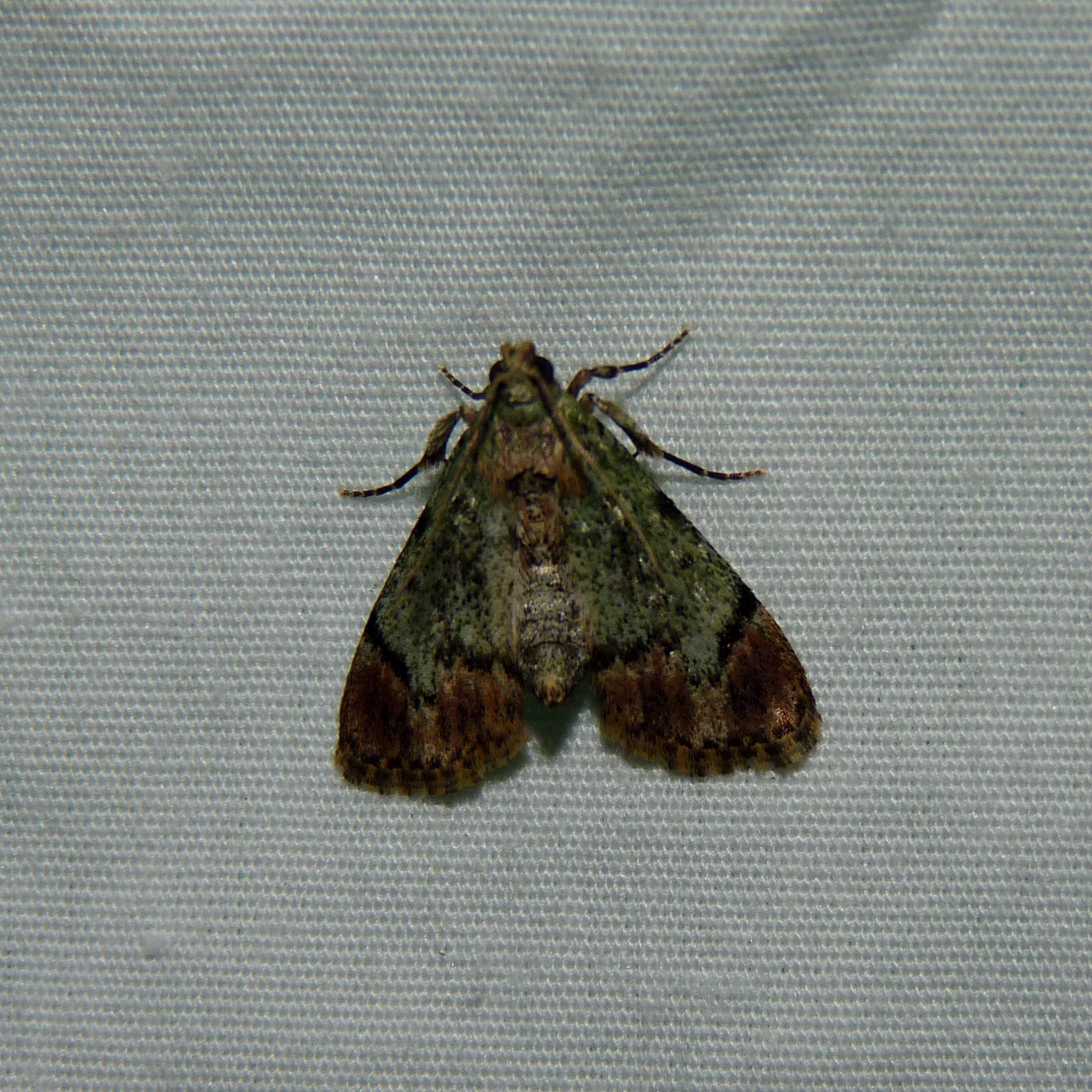
- Macalla superatalis

Scientific classification
- Kingdom: Animalia
- Phylum: Arthropoda
- Clade: Pancrustacea
- Class: Insecta
- Order: Lepidoptera
- Family: Pyralidae
- Subfamily: Epipaschiinae
- Genus: Epipaschia; Clemens, 1860

= Epipaschia =

Genus of moths

Epipaschia is a genus of snout moths. It was described by James Brackenridge Clemens in 1860.

== Species ==
- Epipaschia mesoleucalis
- Epipaschia ochrotalis
- Epipaschia superatalis Clemens, 1860
