= Dasyvesica lophotalis =

Scientific classification
- Kingdom: Animalia
- Phylum: Arthropoda
- Class: Insecta
- Order: Lepidoptera
- Family: Pyralidae
- Genus: Dasyvesica
- Species: D. lophotalis

Binomial name
- Dasyvesica lophotalis (Hampson, 1906)

Synonyms
- Jocara lophotalis Hampson, 1906

Species of moth

Dasyvesica lophotalis is a species of snout moth in the genus Dasyvesica. It is found in Jamaica and Costa Rica.
