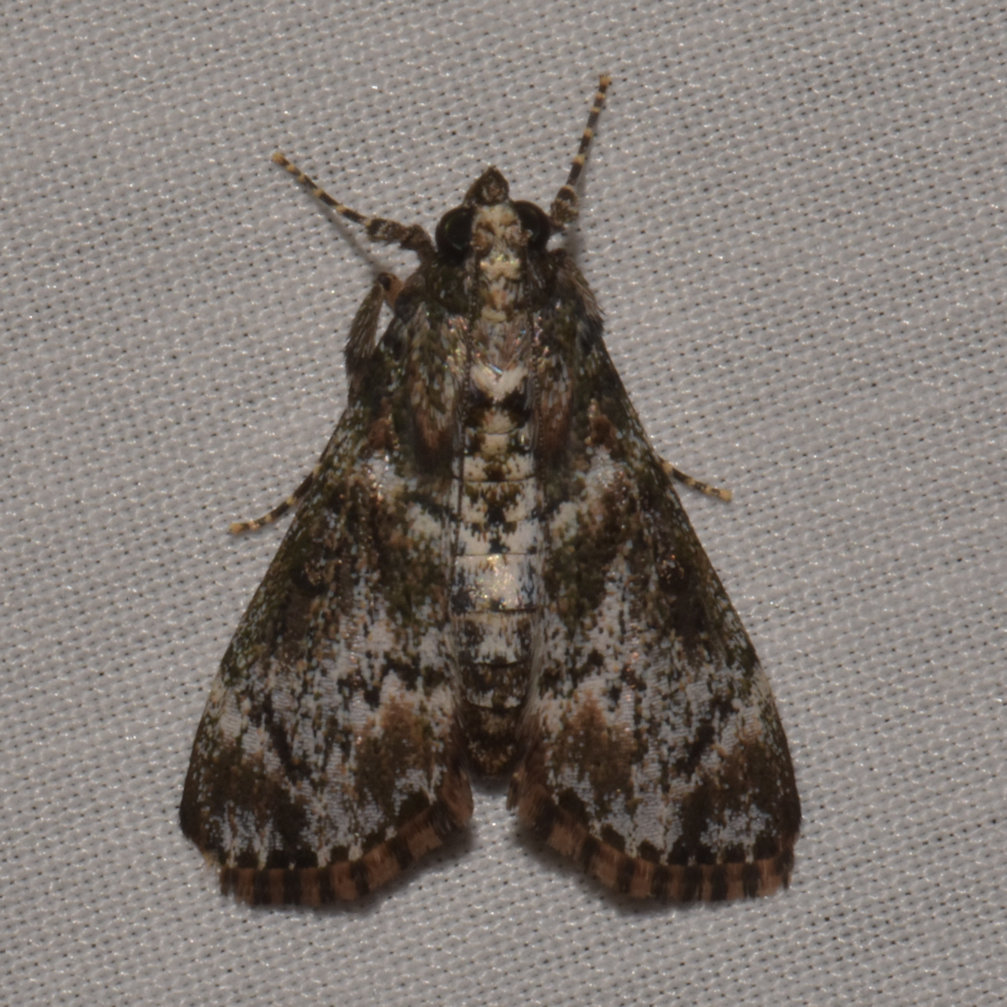

Scientific classification
- Kingdom: Animalia
- Phylum: Arthropoda
- Class: Insecta
- Order: Lepidoptera
- Family: Pyralidae
- Genus: Macalla
- Species: M. phaeobasalis

Binomial name
- Macalla phaeobasalis Hampson, 1916

= Macalla phaeobasalis =

Species of moth

Macalla phaeobasalis is a species of snout moth in the genus Macalla. It was described by George Hampson in 1916 and is known from Cuba, Jamaica and Florida.
