= Macalla noctuipalpis =

Scientific classification
- Domain: Eukaryota
- Kingdom: Animalia
- Phylum: Arthropoda
- Class: Insecta
- Order: Lepidoptera
- Family: Pyralidae
- Genus: Macalla
- Species: M. noctuipalpis

Binomial name
- Macalla noctuipalpis (Dognin, 1908)

Synonyms
- Pseudomacalla noctuipalpis Dognin, 1908; Macalla asymmetrica Amsel, 1956; Macalla symmetrica Amsel, 1956; Macalla sinualis E. D. Jones, 1912

Species of moth

Macalla noctuipalpis is a species of snout moth in the genus Macalla. It was described by Paul Dognin in 1908, and is known from Venezuela (including Maracay), Argentina (including Tucumán) and Brazil.
