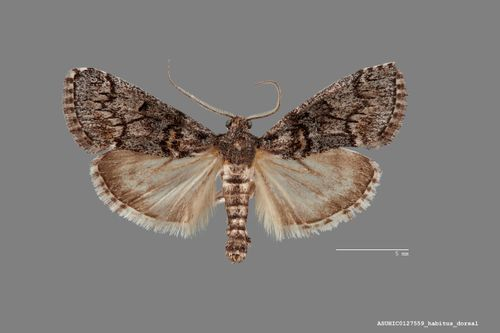

Scientific classification
- Kingdom: Animalia
- Phylum: Arthropoda
- Class: Insecta
- Order: Lepidoptera
- Family: Pyralidae
- Genus: Cacozelia
- Species: C. interruptella

Binomial name
- Cacozelia interruptella (Ragonot, 1888)

Synonyms
- Epipaschia interruptella Ragonot, 1888; Jocara dentilineella Hulst, 1900

= Cacozelia interruptella =

Species of moth

Cacozelia interruptella is a species of snout moth in the genus Cacozelia. It is found in North America, including Arizona and Florida.
