= Pandoflabella tresaina =

Scientific classification
- Kingdom: Animalia
- Phylum: Arthropoda
- Class: Insecta
- Order: Lepidoptera
- Family: Pyralidae
- Genus: Pandoflabella
- Species: P. tresaina

Binomial name
- Pandoflabella tresaina (Schaus, 1922)

Synonyms
- Auradisa tresaina Schaus, 1922

Species of moth

Pandoflabella tresaina is a species of snout moth in the genus Pandoflabella. It is found in French Guiana.
