= Mediavia vimina =

Scientific classification
- Kingdom: Animalia
- Phylum: Arthropoda
- Class: Insecta
- Order: Lepidoptera
- Family: Pyralidae
- Genus: Mediavia
- Species: M. vimina

Binomial name
- Mediavia vimina (Schaus, 1922)

Synonyms
- Jocara vimina Schaus, 1922

Species of moth

Mediavia vimina is a species of snout moth in the genus Mediavia. It was described by Schaus in 1922. It is found in Guatemala.
