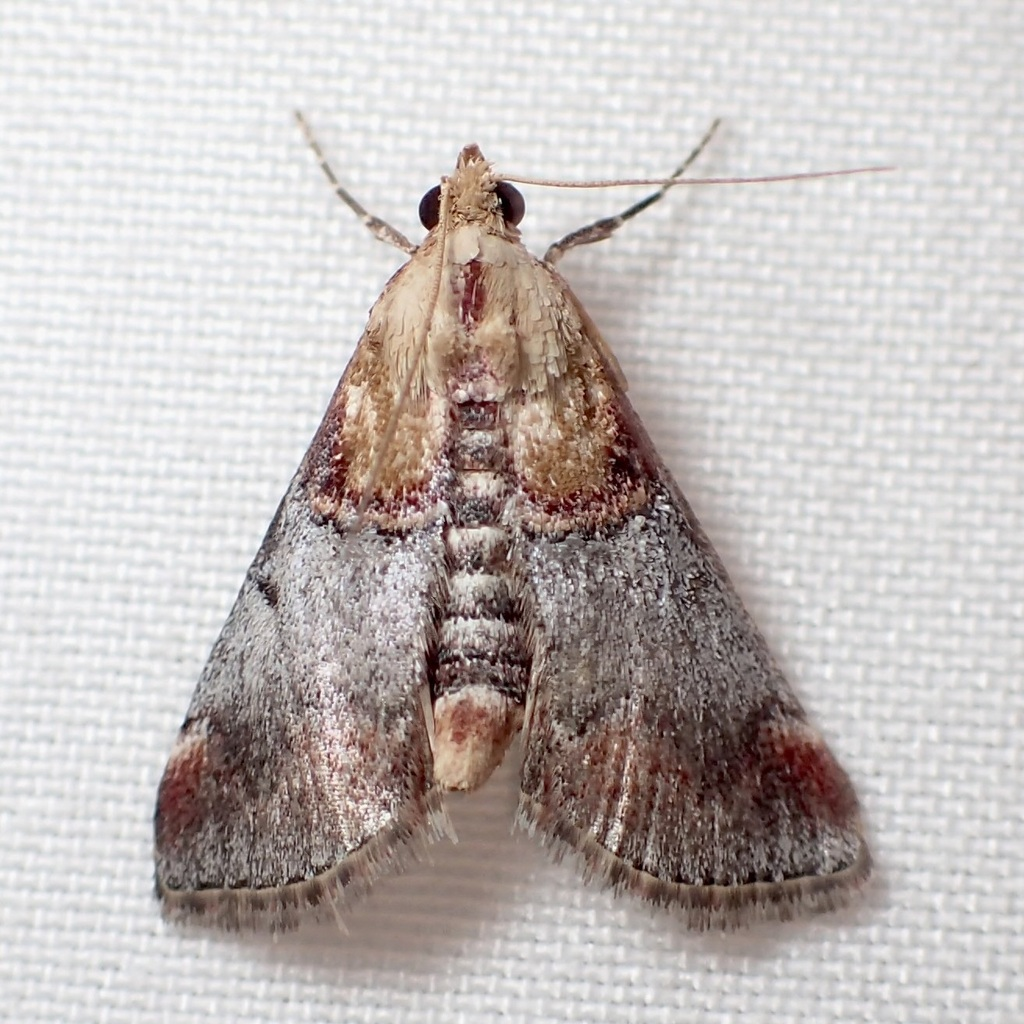

Scientific classification
- Kingdom: Animalia
- Phylum: Arthropoda
- Class: Insecta
- Order: Lepidoptera
- Family: Pyralidae
- Genus: Cacozelia
- Species: C. basiochrealis

Binomial name
- Cacozelia basiochrealis Grote, 1878

= Cacozelia basiochrealis =

Species of moth

Cacozelia basiochrealis, the yellow-based cacozelia, is a species of snout moth in the genus Cacozelia. It was described by Augustus Radcliffe Grote in 1878. It is found in the southern part of the United States.

The length of the forewings is 9–11.5 mm. Adults are generally on wing from late July to early September, but have also been recorded in June and October.
