= Macalla regalis =

Scientific classification
- Domain: Eukaryota
- Kingdom: Animalia
- Phylum: Arthropoda
- Class: Insecta
- Order: Lepidoptera
- Family: Pyralidae
- Genus: Macalla
- Species: M. regalis

Binomial name
- Macalla regalis E. D. Jones, 1912

Synonyms
- Macalla euryleuca Hampson, 1916; Macalla hyutanahana Schauss, 1925

Species of moth

Macalla regalis is a species of snout moth in the genus Macalla. It was described by E. Dukinfield Jones in 1912. It is found in Brazil and Peru.
