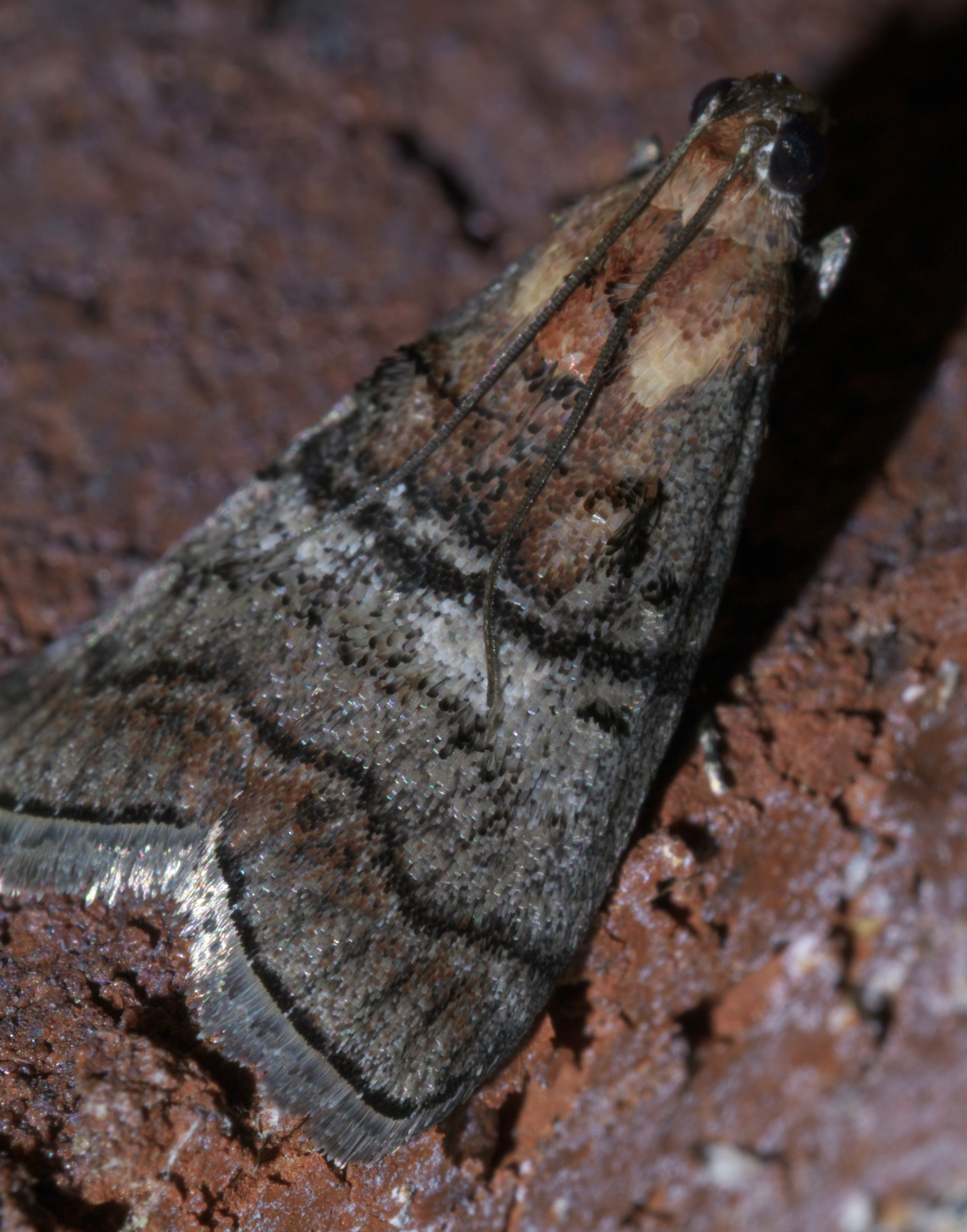

Scientific classification
- Kingdom: Animalia
- Phylum: Arthropoda
- Clade: Pancrustacea
- Class: Insecta
- Order: Lepidoptera
- Family: Pyralidae
- Genus: Pococera
- Species: P. maritimalis

Binomial name
- Pococera maritimalis McDunnough, 1939

= Pococera maritimalis =

Species of moth

Pococera maritimalis is a species of pyralid moth in the family Pyralidae.

The MONA or Hodges number for Pococera maritimalis is 5603.
