= Pandoflabella =

Scientific classification
- Kingdom: Animalia
- Phylum: Arthropoda
- Clade: Pancrustacea
- Class: Insecta
- Order: Lepidoptera
- Family: Pyralidae
- Subfamily: Epipaschiinae
- Genus: Pandoflabella; Solis, 1993

Genus of moths

Pandoflabella is a genus of snout moths. It was erected by Maria Alma Solis in 1993.

== Species ==
- Pandoflabella brendana
- Pandoflabella corumbina
- Pandoflabella fechina
- Pandoflabella guianica
- Pandoflabella nigrilunalis
- Pandoflabella nigriplaga (Dognin, 1910)
- Pandoflabella olivescens
- Pandoflabella remberta
- Pandoflabella stenipteralis
- Pandoflabella strigidiscalis
- Pandoflabella tresaina
