= Mediavia hermengilda =

Scientific classification
- Kingdom: Animalia
- Phylum: Arthropoda
- Class: Insecta
- Order: Lepidoptera
- Family: Pyralidae
- Genus: Mediavia
- Species: M. hermengilda

Binomial name
- Mediavia hermengilda (Schaus, 1925)

Synonyms
- Stericta hermengilda Schaus, 1925

Species of moth

Mediavia hermengilda is a species of snout moth in the genus Mediavia. It was described by Schaus in 1925. It is found in South America.
