= Macalla nubilalis =

Scientific classification
- Kingdom: Animalia
- Phylum: Arthropoda
- Class: Insecta
- Order: Lepidoptera
- Family: Pyralidae
- Genus: Macalla
- Species: M. nubilalis

Binomial name
- Macalla nubilalis Hampson, 1893

Species of moth

Macalla nubilalis is a moth in the family Pyralidae.
