= Epipaschia ochrotalis =

Scientific classification
- Kingdom: Animalia
- Phylum: Arthropoda
- Class: Insecta
- Order: Lepidoptera
- Family: Pyralidae
- Genus: Epipaschia
- Species: E. ochrotalis

Binomial name
- Epipaschia ochrotalis (Hampson, 1906)

Synonyms
- Macalla ochrotalis Hampson, 1906

Species of moth

Epipaschia ochrotalis is a species of snout moth in the genus Epipaschia. It is found in French Guiana.
