= Pandoflabella brendana =

Scientific classification
- Kingdom: Animalia
- Phylum: Arthropoda
- Class: Insecta
- Order: Lepidoptera
- Family: Pyralidae
- Genus: Pandoflabella
- Species: P. brendana

Binomial name
- Pandoflabella brendana (Schaus, 1925)

Synonyms
- Auradisa brendana Schaus, 1925

Species of moth

Pandoflabella brendana is a species of snout moth in the genus Pandoflabella. It is found in French Guiana.
