= Mediavia longistriga =

Scientific classification
- Kingdom: Animalia
- Phylum: Arthropoda
- Class: Insecta
- Order: Lepidoptera
- Family: Pyralidae
- Genus: Mediavia
- Species: M. longistriga

Binomial name
- Mediavia longistriga Schaus, 1922

Synonyms
- Jocara longistriga Schaus, 1922; Stericta comgalla Schaus, 1925

Species of moth

Mediavia longistriga is a species of snout moth in the genus Mediavia. It was described by Schaus in 1922. It is found from Guatemala to South America.

It was moved to the genus Mediavia in 1993.
