= Mediavia grenvilalis =

Scientific classification
- Kingdom: Animalia
- Phylum: Arthropoda
- Class: Insecta
- Order: Lepidoptera
- Family: Pyralidae
- Genus: Mediavia
- Species: M. grenvilalis

Binomial name
- Mediavia grenvilalis (Schaus, 1934)

Synonyms
- Jocara grenvilalis Schaus, 1934

Species of moth

Mediavia grenvilalis is a species of snout moth in the genus Mediavia. It was described by Schaus in 1934. It is found in Brazil.
