= Pandoflabella strigidiscalis =

Scientific classification
- Kingdom: Animalia
- Phylum: Arthropoda
- Class: Insecta
- Order: Lepidoptera
- Family: Pyralidae
- Genus: Pandoflabella
- Species: P. strigidiscalis

Binomial name
- Pandoflabella strigidiscalis (Hampson, 1916)

Synonyms
- Pococera strigidiscalis Hampson, 1916

Species of moth

Pandoflabella strigidiscalis is a species of snout moth in the genus Pandoflabella. It is found in Central America.
