= Dasyvesica crinitalis =

Scientific classification
- Domain: Eukaryota
- Kingdom: Animalia
- Phylum: Arthropoda
- Class: Insecta
- Order: Lepidoptera
- Family: Pyralidae
- Genus: Dasyvesica
- Species: D. crinitalis

Binomial name
- Dasyvesica crinitalis (Schaus, 1922)

Synonyms
- Jocara crinitalis Schaus, 1922

Species of moth

Dasyvesica crinitalis is a species of snout moth in the genus Dasyvesica. It is found in Guatemala.
