= Macalla niveorufa =

Scientific classification
- Kingdom: Animalia
- Phylum: Arthropoda
- Class: Insecta
- Order: Lepidoptera
- Family: Pyralidae
- Genus: Macalla
- Species: M. niveorufa

Binomial name
- Macalla niveorufa Hampson, 1906

Species of moth

Macalla niveorufa is a species of snout moth in the genus Macalla. It was described by George Hampson in 1906. It is found in Panama.
