= Cacozelia neotropica =

Scientific classification
- Domain: Eukaryota
- Kingdom: Animalia
- Phylum: Arthropoda
- Class: Insecta
- Order: Lepidoptera
- Family: Pyralidae
- Genus: Cacozelia
- Species: C. neotropica

Binomial name
- Cacozelia neotropica (Amsel, 1956)

Synonyms
- Tioga neoptropica Amsel, 1956

Species of moth

Cacozelia neotropica is a species of snout moth in the genus Cacozelia. It was described by Hans Georg Amsel in 1956 and is known from Venezuela.
