= Macalla arctata =

Scientific classification
- Domain: Eukaryota
- Kingdom: Animalia
- Phylum: Arthropoda
- Class: Insecta
- Order: Lepidoptera
- Family: Pyralidae
- Genus: Macalla
- Species: M. arctata

Binomial name
- Macalla arctata (H. Druce, 1902)

Synonyms
- Cecidiptera arctata H. Druce, 1902

Species of moth

Macalla arctata is a species of snout moth in the genus Macalla. It was described by Herbert Druce in 1902 and is known from Peru (including Chanchamayo, the type location).
