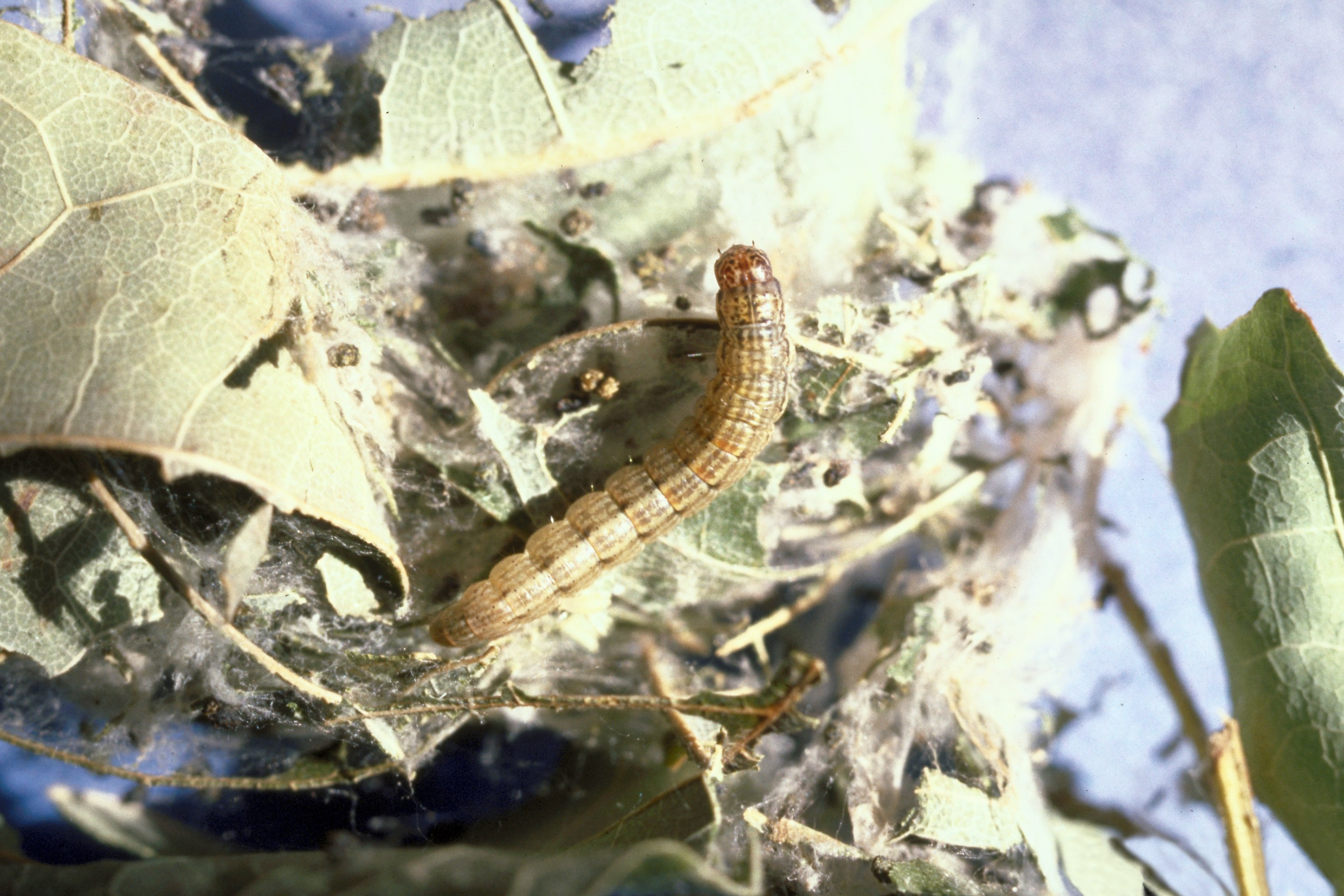

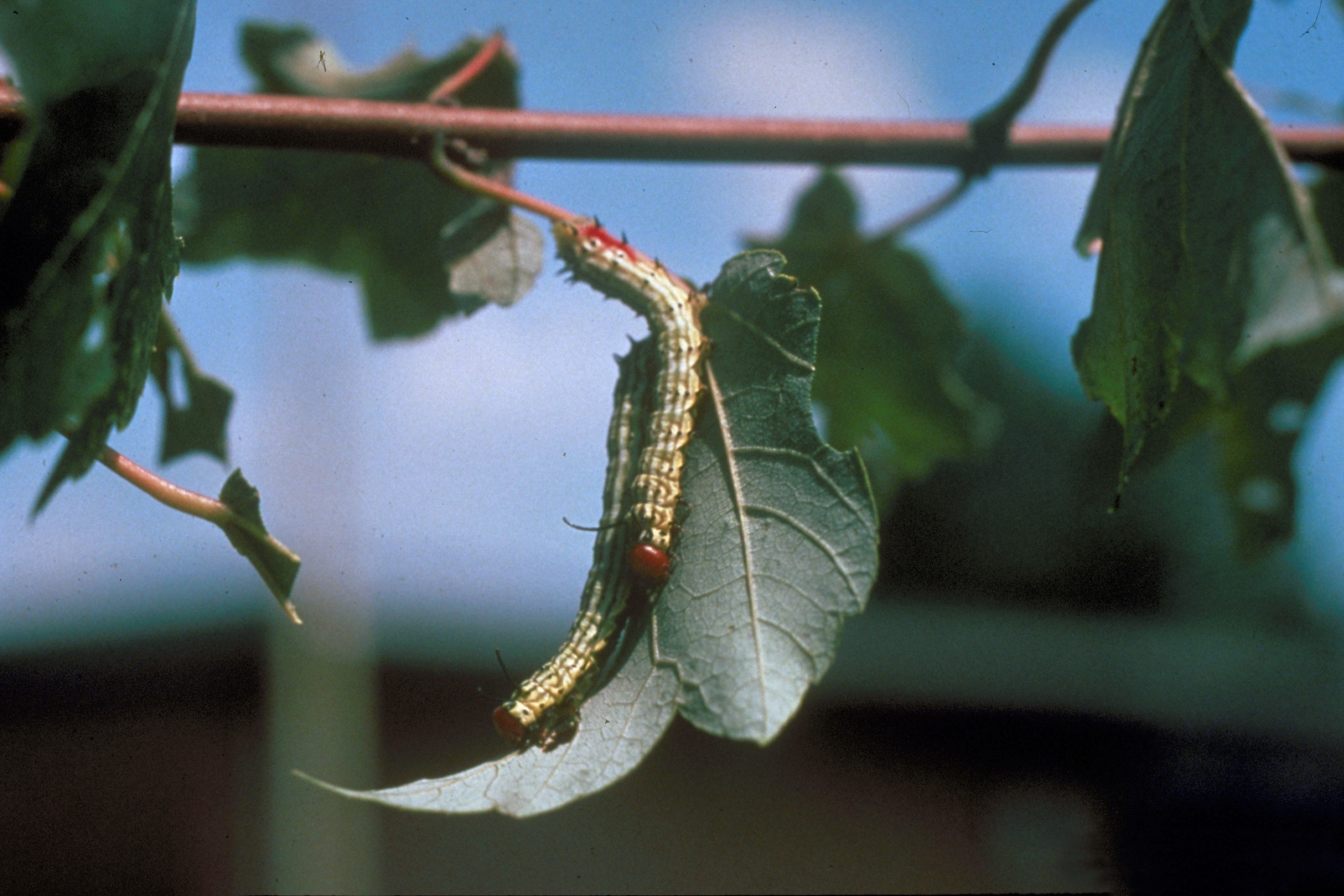

Scientific classification
- Kingdom: Animalia
- Phylum: Arthropoda
- Clade: Pancrustacea
- Class: Insecta
- Order: Lepidoptera
- Family: Pyralidae
- Genus: Pococera
- Species: P. asperatella

Binomial name
- Pococera asperatella (Clemens, 1860)

Synonyms
- Lanthaphe asperatella Clemens, 1860; Tetralopha asperatella

= Pococera asperatella =

Species of moth

Pococera asperatella, the maple webworm moth, is a moth of the family Pyralidae. It is found in North America, including Alabama, Illinois, Massachusetts, Minnesota, New Hampshire, New Jersey, North Carolina, Oklahoma, Ontario, Pennsylvania, South Carolina, Tennessee, Texas, Virginia and Wisconsin.

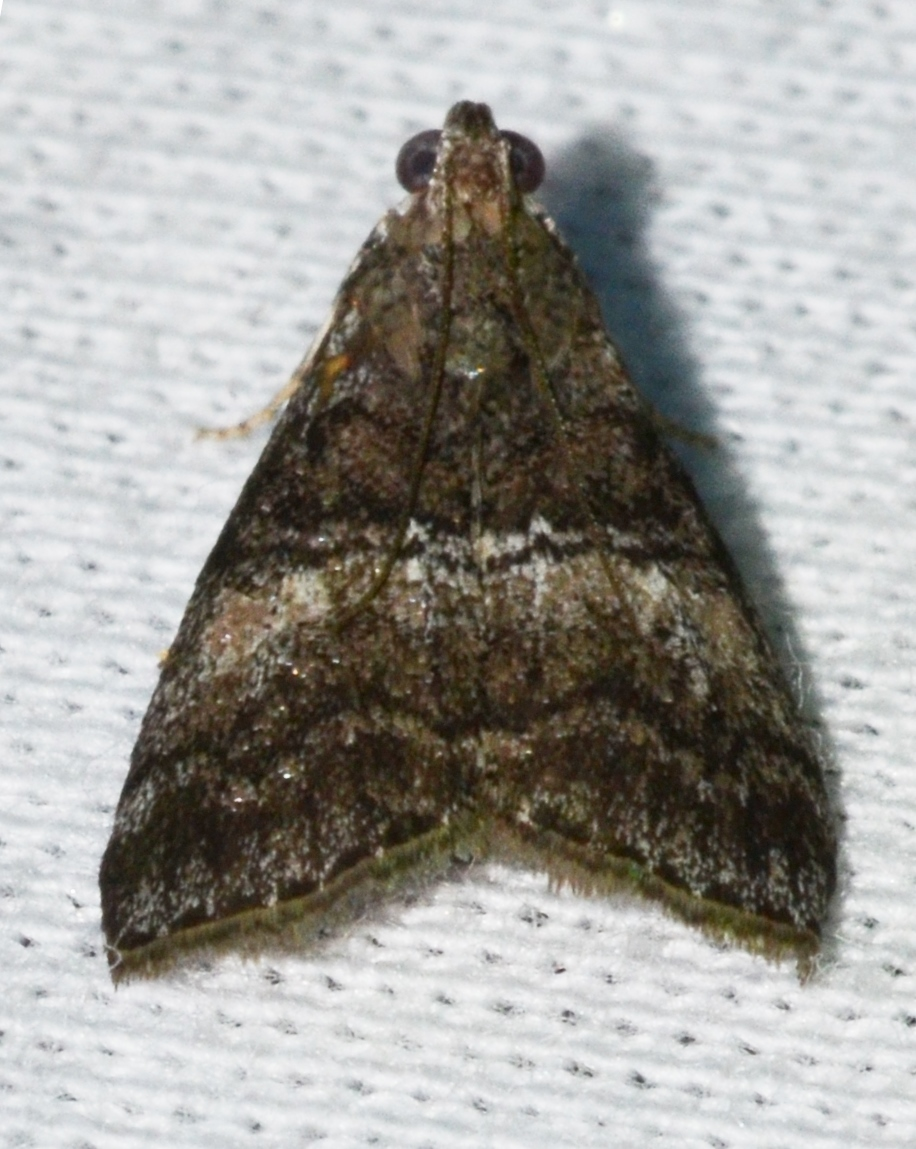

Adults are powdery gray. There is one generation per year.

The larvae have been recorded feeding on the foliage of various hardwood species, including Rhus and Acer species.
