= Mediavia dissimilis =

Scientific classification
- Kingdom: Animalia
- Phylum: Arthropoda
- Class: Insecta
- Order: Lepidoptera
- Family: Pyralidae
- Genus: Mediavia
- Species: M. dissimilis

Binomial name
- Mediavia dissimilis Warren, 1891

Species of moth

Mediavia dissimilis is a species of snout moth in the genus Mediavia. It was described by Warren in 1891. It is found in Brazil.
