= Pandoflabella corumbina =

Scientific classification
- Kingdom: Animalia
- Phylum: Arthropoda
- Class: Insecta
- Order: Lepidoptera
- Family: Pyralidae
- Genus: Pandoflabella
- Species: P. corumbina

Binomial name
- Pandoflabella corumbina (Schaus, 1925)

Synonyms
- Auradisa corumbina Schaus, 1925

Species of moth

Pandoflabella corumbina is a species of snout moth in the genus Pandoflabella. It is found in Bolivia.
