= Macalla chosenalis =

Scientific classification
- Domain: Eukaryota
- Kingdom: Animalia
- Phylum: Arthropoda
- Class: Insecta
- Order: Lepidoptera
- Family: Pyralidae
- Genus: Macalla
- Species: M. chosenalis

Binomial name
- Macalla chosenalis Shibuya, 1927

Species of moth

Macalla chosenalis is a species of snout moth in the genus Macalla. It was described by Shibuya in 1927, and is known from Korea (including Shakuoji, the type location).
