= Macalla nebulosa =

Scientific classification
- Domain: Eukaryota
- Kingdom: Animalia
- Phylum: Arthropoda
- Class: Insecta
- Order: Lepidoptera
- Family: Pyralidae
- Genus: Macalla
- Species: M. nebulosa

Binomial name
- Macalla nebulosa Schaus, 1912

Species of moth

Macalla nebulosa is a species of snout moth in the genus Macalla. It was described by Schaus in 1912. It is found in Costa Rica.
