= Macalla pallidomedia =

Scientific classification
- Kingdom: Animalia
- Phylum: Arthropoda
- Class: Insecta
- Order: Lepidoptera
- Family: Pyralidae
- Genus: Macalla
- Species: M. pallidomedia

Binomial name
- Macalla pallidomedia Dyar, 1910

Synonyms
- Macalla macallalis Schaus, 1934

Species of moth

Macalla pallidomedia is a species of snout moth in the genus Macalla. It was described by Harrison Gray Dyar Jr. in 1910. It is found in Guyana and Brazil.
