= Cacozelia =

Scientific classification
- Kingdom: Animalia
- Phylum: Arthropoda
- Clade: Pancrustacea
- Class: Insecta
- Order: Lepidoptera
- Family: Pyralidae
- Subfamily: Epipaschiinae
- Genus: Cacozelia; Grote, 1878

Genus of moths

Cacozelia is a genus of snout moths. It was described by Augustus Radcliffe Grote in 1878 and is known from Venezuela.

== Species ==
- Cacozelia basiochrealis Grote, 1878
- Cacozelia elegans (Schaus, 1912)
- Cacozelia interruptella
- Cacozelia neotropica (Amsel, 1956)
- Cacozelia pemphusalis (=Cacozelia alboplagialis Dyar, 1905)
