= Mediavia discalis =

Scientific classification
- Kingdom: Animalia
- Phylum: Arthropoda
- Class: Insecta
- Order: Lepidoptera
- Family: Pyralidae
- Genus: Mediavia
- Species: M. discalis

Binomial name
- Mediavia discalis Hampson, 1906

Species of moth

Mediavia discalis is a species of snout moth in the genus Mediavia. It was described by George Hampson in 1906. It is found in French Guiana.
