= Dasyvesica =

Scientific classification
- Kingdom: Animalia
- Phylum: Arthropoda
- Clade: Pancrustacea
- Class: Insecta
- Order: Lepidoptera
- Family: Pyralidae
- Subfamily: Epipaschiinae
- Genus: Dasyvesica; Solis, 1991

Genus of moths

Dasyvesica is a genus of snout moths erected by Maria Alma Solis in 1991.

== Species ==
- Dasyvesica crinitalis
- Dasyvesica lophotalis
- Dasyvesica nepomuca
