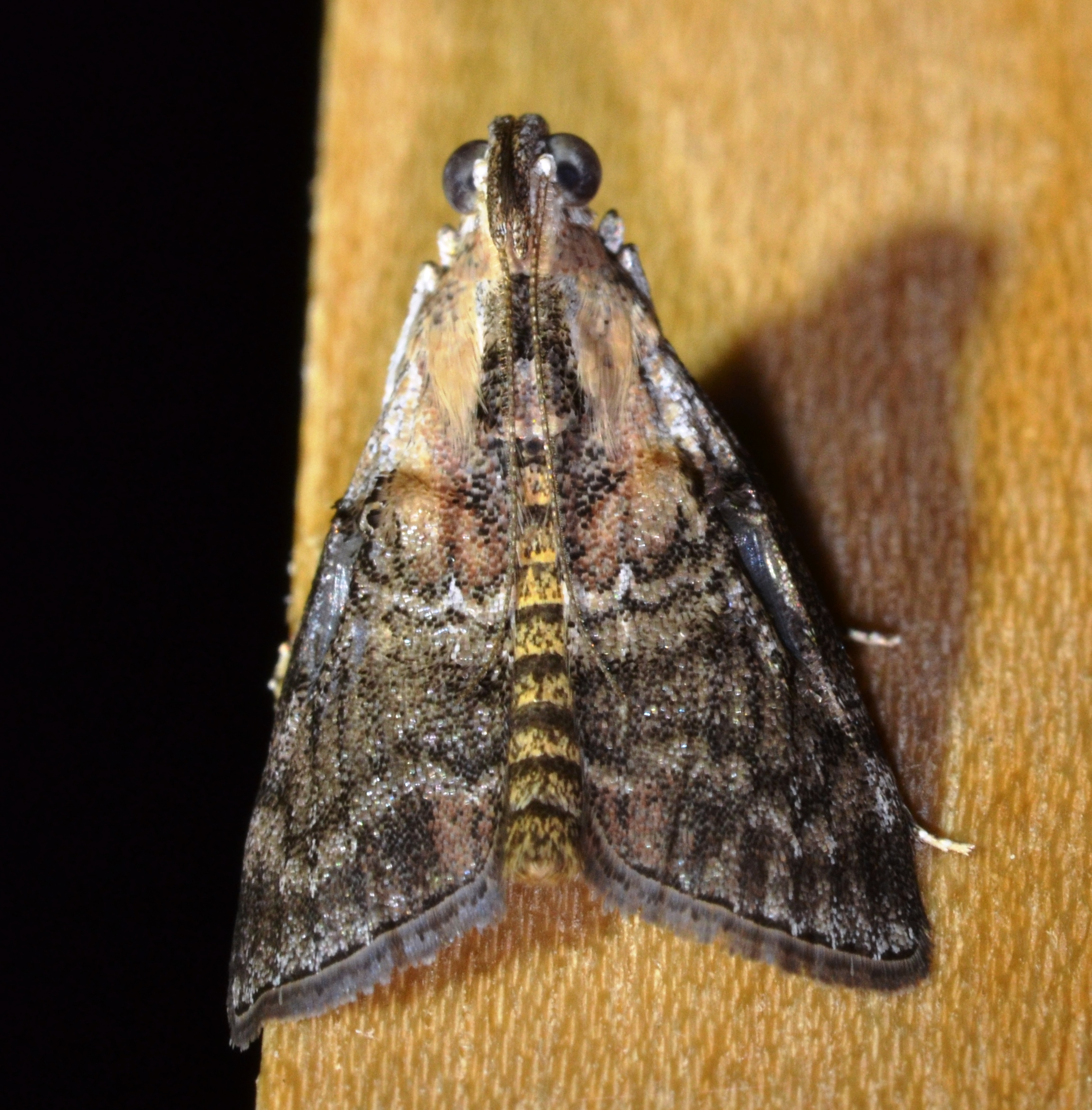

Scientific classification
- Kingdom: Animalia
- Phylum: Arthropoda
- Clade: Pancrustacea
- Class: Insecta
- Order: Lepidoptera
- Family: Pyralidae
- Genus: Pococera
- Species: P. expandens

Binomial name
- Pococera expandens (Walker, 1863)

Synonyms
- Benta expandens Walker, 1863; Tetralopha expandens; Loma nephelotella Hulst, 1888; Tetralopha clemensalis Dyar, 1905

= Pococera expandens =

Species of moth

Pococera expandens, the striped oak webworm moth or double-humped pococera moth, is a moth of the family Pyralidae. It is found in North America, where it has been recorded from Arizona, Arkansas, British Columbia, Georgia, Illinois, Indiana, Iowa, Kentucky, Louisiana, Maine, Manitoba, Maryland, Massachusetts, Mississippi, New Brunswick, New Hampshire, New Jersey, New York, North Carolina, Ohio, Oklahoma, Ontario, Pennsylvania, Quebec, South Carolina, Tennessee, Texas, Virginia, West Virginia and Wisconsin.

The wingspan is 22 mm. Adults have been recorded on wing from April to September.
