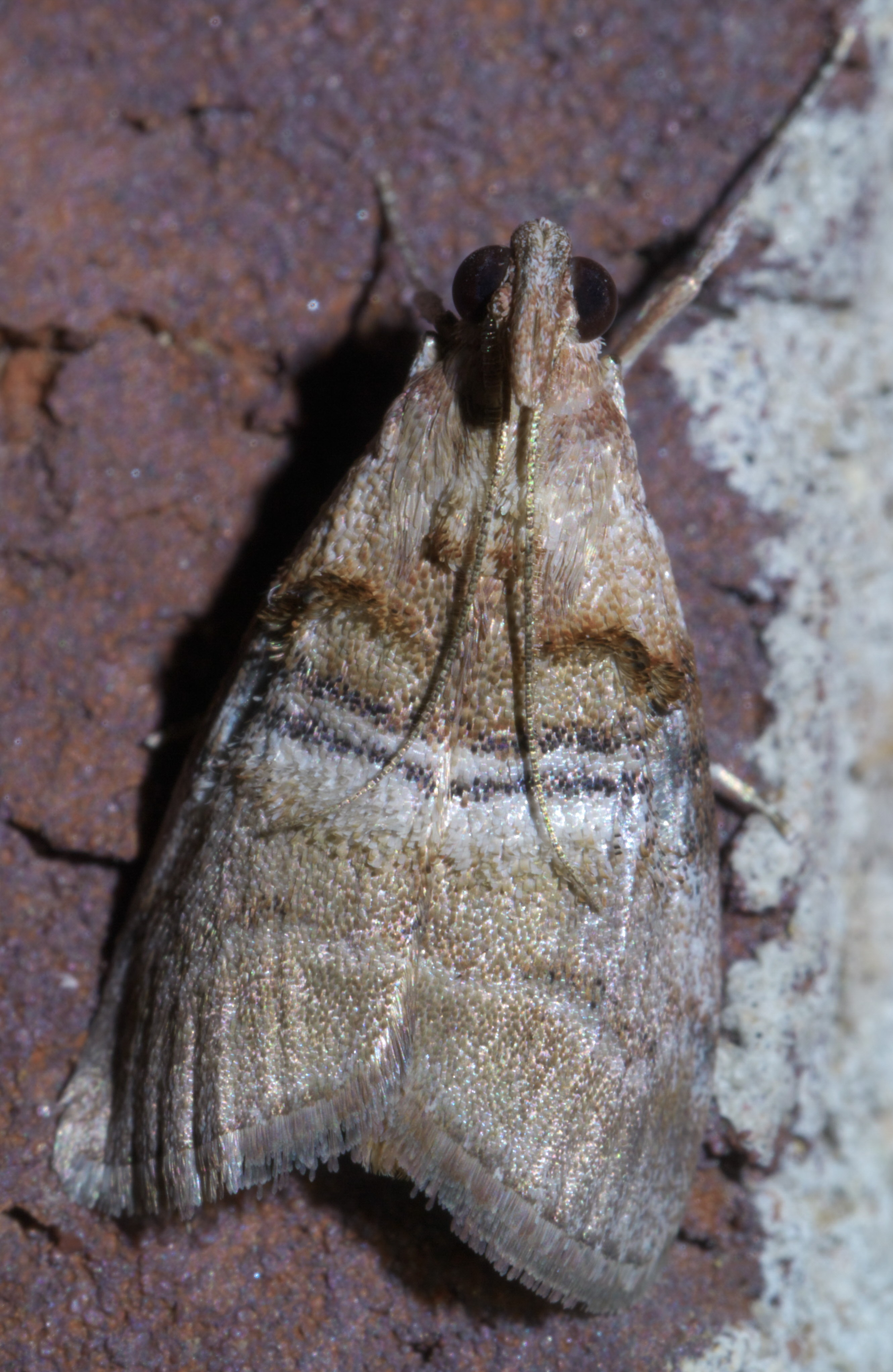

Scientific classification
- Kingdom: Animalia
- Phylum: Arthropoda
- Clade: Pancrustacea
- Class: Insecta
- Order: Lepidoptera
- Family: Pyralidae
- Genus: Pococera
- Species: P. militella

Binomial name
- Pococera militella Zeller, 1848

= Pococera militella =

Species of moth

Pococera militella, the sycamore webworm, is a species of pyralid moth in the family Pyralidae.

The MONA or Hodges number for Pococera militella is 5604.

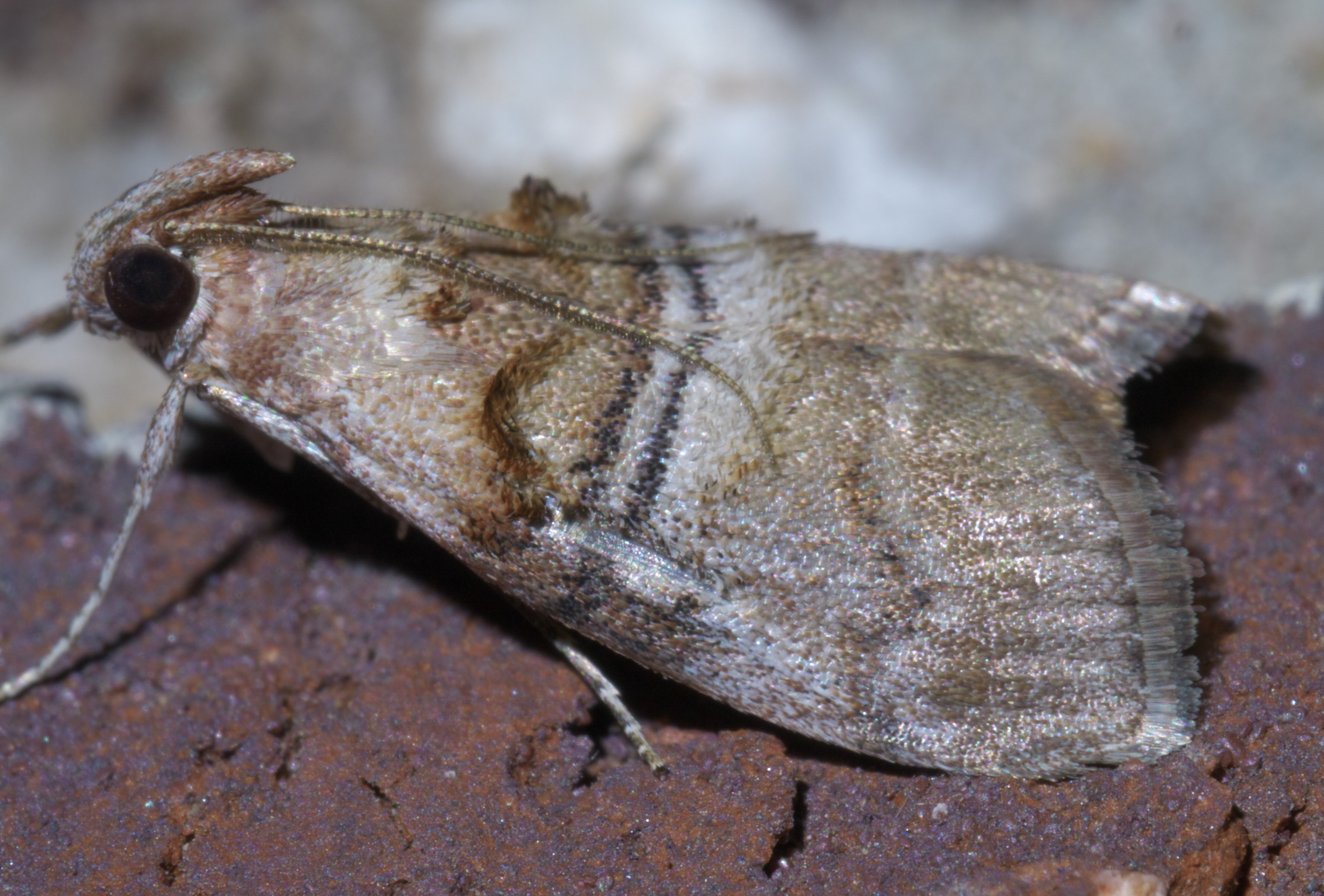
Sycamore webworm, Pococera militella
