= Macalla fasciculata =

Scientific classification
- Kingdom: Animalia
- Phylum: Arthropoda
- Clade: Pancrustacea
- Class: Insecta
- Order: Lepidoptera
- Family: Pyralidae
- Genus: Macalla
- Species: M. fasciculata

Binomial name
- Macalla fasciculata Hampson, 1906

Synonyms
- Termioptycha fasciculata (Hampson, 1906)

Species of moth

Macalla fasciculata is a species of snout moth in the genus Macalla. It was described by George Hampson in 1906. It is found in South Africa.
