= Macalla seyrigalis =

Scientific classification
- Kingdom: Animalia
- Phylum: Arthropoda
- Class: Insecta
- Order: Lepidoptera
- Family: Pyralidae
- Genus: Macalla
- Species: M. seyrigalis

Binomial name
- Macalla seyrigalis Marion & Viette, 1956

Synonyms
- Macalla seyrigalis insularis Viette, 1960

Species of moth

Macalla seyrigalis is a species of snout moth in the genus Macalla. It was described by Hubert Marion and Pierre Viette in 1956, and is known from Madagascar and the Comoros (Mayotte and Anjouan).
