= Macalla mixtalis =

Scientific classification
- Kingdom: Animalia
- Phylum: Arthropoda
- Class: Insecta
- Order: Lepidoptera
- Family: Pyralidae
- Genus: Macalla
- Species: M. mixtalis

Binomial name
- Macalla mixtalis Walker, [1866]

Species of moth

Macalla mixtalis is a species of snout moth in the genus Macalla. It was described by Francis Walker in 1866. It is found in Honduras.
