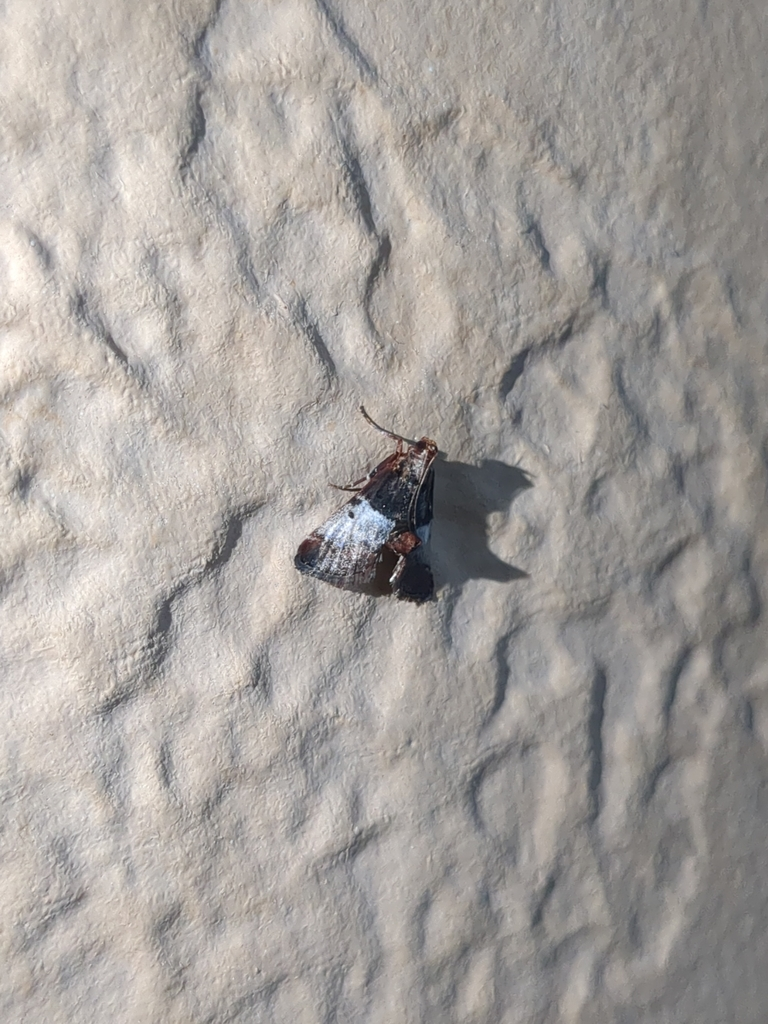

Scientific classification
- Domain: Eukaryota
- Kingdom: Animalia
- Phylum: Arthropoda
- Class: Insecta
- Order: Lepidoptera
- Family: Pyralidae
- Genus: Cacozelia
- Species: C. pemphusalis

Binomial name
- Cacozelia pemphusalis (H. Druce, 1899)

Synonyms
- Pococera pemphusalis H. Druce, 1899; Cacozelia albomedialis Dyar, 1905

= Cacozelia pemphusalis =

Species of moth

Cacozelia pemphusalis is a species of snout moth in the genus Cacozelia. It was described by Herbert Druce in 1899. It is found in the southern part of the United States, including Arizona.
