= Pandoflabella nigriplaga =

Scientific classification
- Kingdom: Animalia
- Phylum: Arthropoda
- Class: Insecta
- Order: Lepidoptera
- Family: Pyralidae
- Genus: Pandoflabella
- Species: P. nigriplaga

Binomial name
- Pandoflabella nigriplaga (Dognin, 1910)

Synonyms
- Auradisa nigriplaga Dognin, 1910

Species of moth

Pandoflabella nigriplaga is a species of snout moth in the genus Pandoflabella. It was described by Paul Dognin in 1910, and is known from French Guiana.
