= Mediavia glaucinalis =

Scientific classification
- Kingdom: Animalia
- Phylum: Arthropoda
- Class: Insecta
- Order: Lepidoptera
- Family: Pyralidae
- Genus: Mediavia
- Species: M. glaucinalis

Binomial name
- Mediavia glaucinalis Hampson, 1906

Synonyms
- Stericta paschasia Schaus, 1925

Species of moth

Mediavia glaucinalis is a species of snout moth in the genus Mediavia. It was described by George Hampson in 1906. It is found in Suriname.
