= Pococera cyrilla =

Scientific classification
- Kingdom: Animalia
- Phylum: Arthropoda
- Class: Insecta
- Order: Lepidoptera
- Family: Pyralidae
- Genus: Pococera
- Species: P. cyrilla

Binomial name
- Pococera cyrilla (Schaus, 1922)

Synonyms
- Tetralopha cyrilla Schaus, 1922; Dasyvesica cyrilla

Species of moth

Pococera cyrilla is a species of snout moth in the genus Pococera. The species was first described by William Schaus in 1922. It is found in Cuba.
