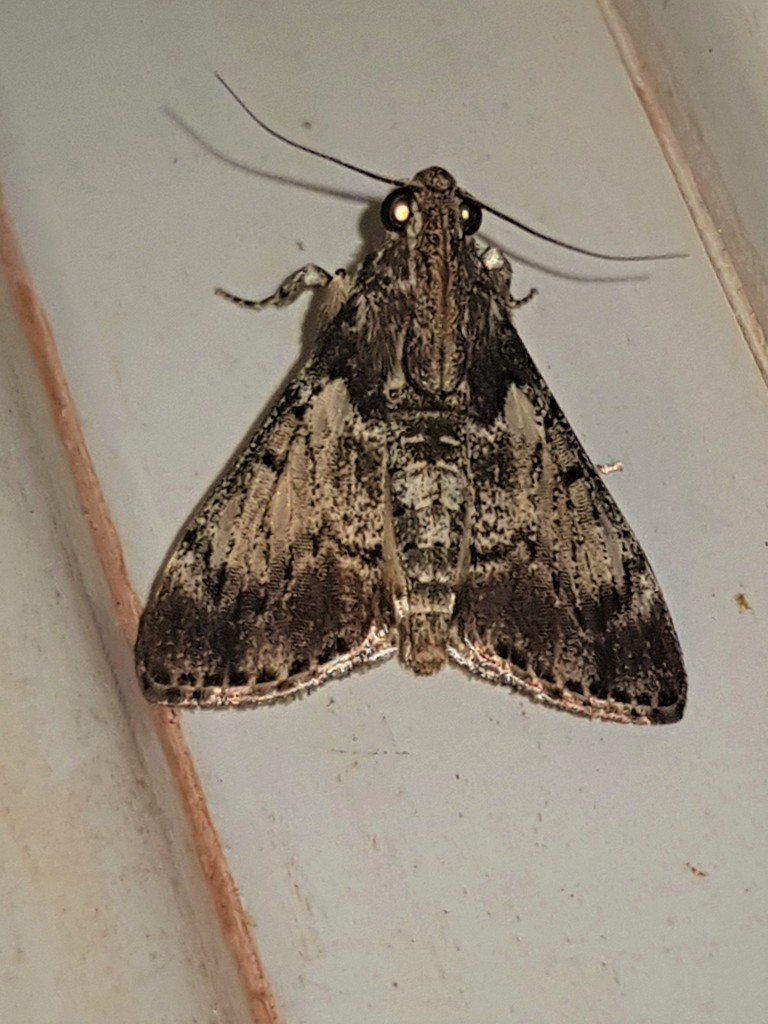

Scientific classification
- Kingdom: Animalia
- Phylum: Arthropoda
- Class: Insecta
- Order: Lepidoptera
- Family: Pyralidae
- Genus: Macalla
- Species: M. thyrsisalis

Binomial name
- Macalla thyrsisalis Walker, [1859]

Synonyms
- Aradrapha mixtalis Walker, 1866

= Macalla thyrsisalis =

Species of moth

Macalla thyrsisalis, the mahogany webworm moth, is a species of snout moth in the genus Macalla. It was described by Francis Walker in 1859. It is found in southern Florida, the Bahamas, Hispaniola, southern Mexico, Central America, Trinidad and the Amazon delta in Brazil.
