= Dasyvesica nepomuca =

Scientific classification
- Domain: Eukaryota
- Kingdom: Animalia
- Phylum: Arthropoda
- Class: Insecta
- Order: Lepidoptera
- Family: Pyralidae
- Genus: Dasyvesica
- Species: D. nepomuca

Binomial name
- Dasyvesica nepomuca (Schaus, 1925)

Synonyms
- Pococera nepomuca Schaus, 1925

Species of moth

Dasyvesica nepomuca is a species of snout moth in the genus Dasyvesica. It is found in Bolivia.
