= Epipaschia mesoleucalis =

Scientific classification
- Kingdom: Animalia
- Phylum: Arthropoda
- Class: Insecta
- Order: Lepidoptera
- Family: Pyralidae
- Genus: Epipaschia
- Species: E. mesoleucalis

Binomial name
- Epipaschia mesoleucalis (Hampson, 1916)

Synonyms
- Pococera mesoleucalis Hampson, 1916; Macalla furseyalis Schaus, 1922

Species of moth

Epipaschia mesoleucalis is a species of snout moth in the genus Epipaschia. It is found in French Guiana and Guatemala.
