= Mediavia internigralis =

Scientific classification
- Kingdom: Animalia
- Phylum: Arthropoda
- Class: Insecta
- Order: Lepidoptera
- Family: Pyralidae
- Genus: Mediavia
- Species: M. internigralis

Binomial name
- Mediavia internigralis (Dognin, 1909)

Synonyms
- Pococera internigralis Dognin, 1909

Species of moth

Mediavia internigralis is a species of snout moth in the genus Mediavia. It was described by Paul Dognin in 1909. It is found in French Guiana.
