= Pandoflabella stenipteralis =

Scientific classification
- Kingdom: Animalia
- Phylum: Arthropoda
- Class: Insecta
- Order: Lepidoptera
- Family: Pyralidae
- Genus: Pandoflabella
- Species: P. stenipteralis

Binomial name
- Pandoflabella stenipteralis (Hampson, 1906)

Synonyms
- Pococera stenipteralis Hampson, 1906

Species of moth

Pandoflabella stenipteralis is a species of snout moth in the genus Pandoflabella. It is found in French Guiana.
