= Pandoflabella nigrilunalis =

Scientific classification
- Kingdom: Animalia
- Phylum: Arthropoda
- Class: Insecta
- Order: Lepidoptera
- Family: Pyralidae
- Genus: Pandoflabella
- Species: P. nigrilunalis

Binomial name
- Pandoflabella nigrilunalis (Dognin, 1913)

Synonyms
- Pococera nigrilunalis Dognin, 1913

Species of moth

Pandoflabella nigrilunalis is a species of snout moth in the genus Pandoflabella. It is found in Guyana.
