= Pandoflabella olivescens =

Scientific classification
- Kingdom: Animalia
- Phylum: Arthropoda
- Class: Insecta
- Order: Lepidoptera
- Family: Pyralidae
- Genus: Pandoflabella
- Species: P. olivescens

Binomial name
- Pandoflabella olivescens (Schaus, 1912)

Synonyms
- Pococera olivescens Schaus, 1912

Species of moth

Pandoflabella olivescens is a species of snout moth in the genus Pandoflabella. It is found in Costa Rica.
