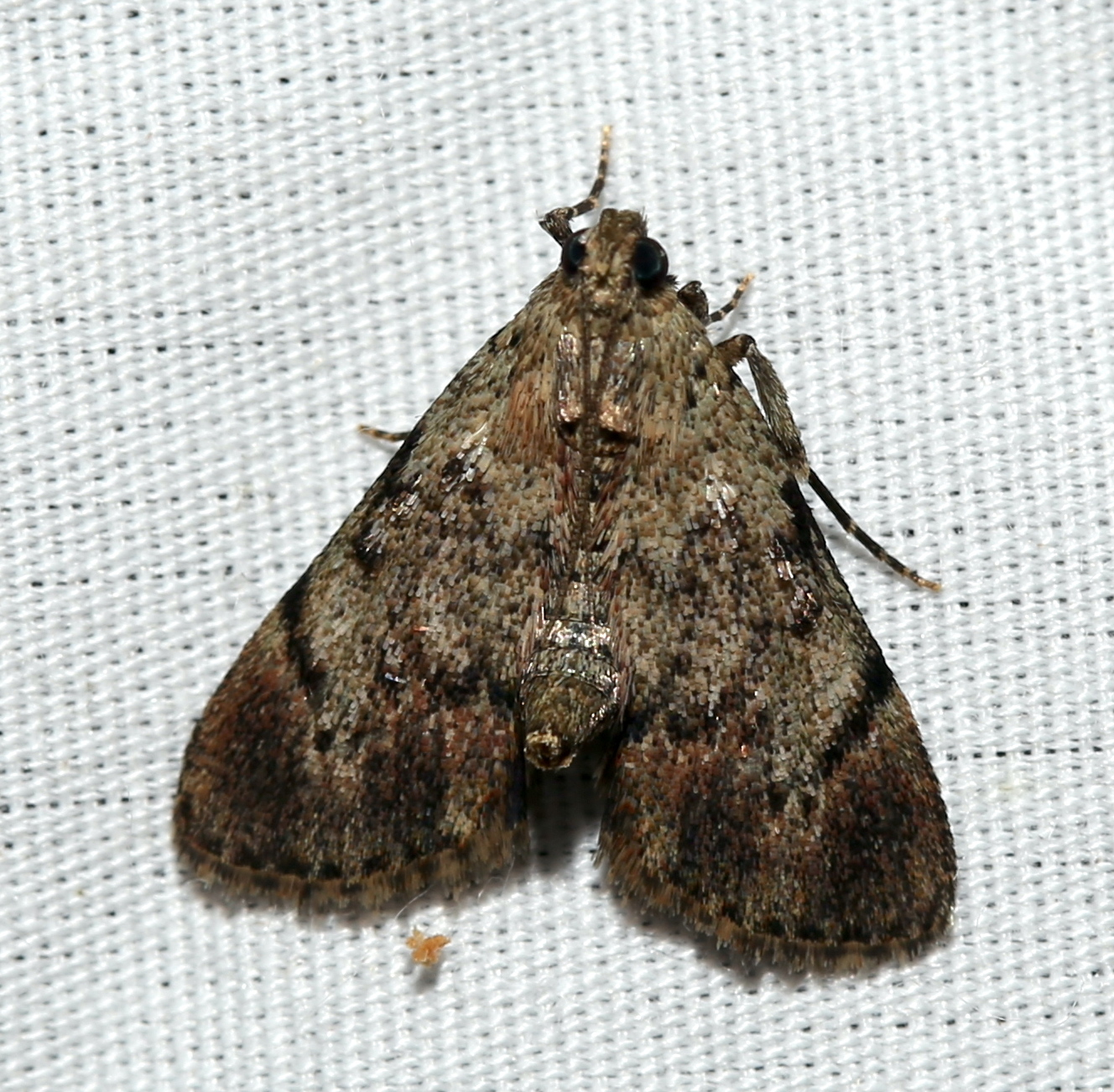

Scientific classification
- Kingdom: Animalia
- Phylum: Arthropoda
- Clade: Pancrustacea
- Class: Insecta
- Order: Lepidoptera
- Family: Pyralidae
- Genus: Epipaschia
- Species: E. superatalis

Binomial name
- Epipaschia superatalis Clemens, 1860

Synonyms
- Epipaschia borealis (Grote, 1870); Epipaschia olivalis (Hulst, 1886); Macalla superatalis; Pococera superatalis

= Epipaschia superatalis =

Species of moth

Epipaschia superatalis, the dimorphic macalla moth, is a moth in the family Pyralidae. It is found in eastern North America.

The wingspan is 17–25 mm. Adults are on wing from late May to August.
