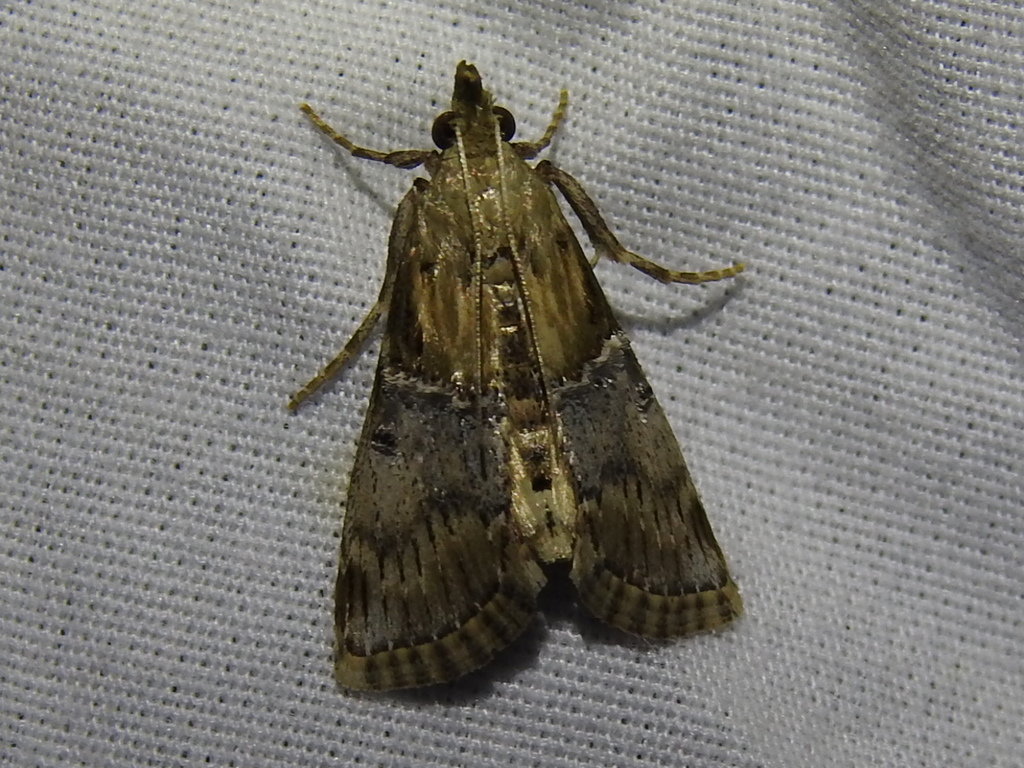

Scientific classification
- Domain: Eukaryota
- Kingdom: Animalia
- Phylum: Arthropoda
- Class: Insecta
- Order: Lepidoptera
- Family: Pyralidae
- Genus: Cacozelia
- Species: C. elegans

Binomial name
- Cacozelia elegans (Schaus, 1912)

Synonyms
- Pococera elegans (Schaus, 1912)

= Cacozelia elegans =

Species of moth

Cacozelia elegans is a snout moth species in the genus Cacozelia. It is found from Venezuela to Costa Rica and Texas.

== See also ==
- List of moths of North America (MONA 5510-6088)
