= Estrella =

Estrella or La Estrella (Spanish for "the star") may refer to:

== Places ==
=== Philippines ===
- Estrella Flyover, a two-lane flyover (overpass) in Metro Manila, Philippines
- Estrella Hospital, in the Province of Cavite, Philippines
- Estrella Street, in Metro Manila, Philippines
- Estrella–Pantaleon Bridge, in Metro Manila, Philippines

=== Spain ===
- Estrella (Madrid), a ward in the Retiro district of Madrid, Spain
  - Estrella (Madrid Metro), a subway station
- Estrella Castle, in Montiel, province of Ciudad Real, Spain
- La Estrella, Spain, a village in the province of Toledo
- La Estrella (Mosqueruela), an abandoned village in the province of Teruel

=== United States ===
Listed alphabetically by state

- Estrella, Arizona, a community in Maricopa County, Arizona
  - Estrella Falls, a regional shopping mall and mixed-use complex in Goodyear, Arizona
- Estrella Freeway, a local name for Arizona State Route 303 in metropolitan Phoenix, Arizona
- Estrella Jail, in Phoenix, Arizona
- Estrella Mountain Community College, in Avondale, Arizona
- Sierra Estrella, a mountain range located southwest of Phoenix, Arizona
- Estrella River, in San Luis Obispo County, California
- Estrella Warbird Museum, at Paso Robles Municipal Airport in California
- Estrella, Colorado, an unincorporated community in Alamosa County, Colorado

=== Elsewhere ===
Listed alphabetically by country

- Estrella, Belize, a village in the Corozal District of Belize
- La Estrella, Chile, a town and commune in Chile
- La Estrella, Antioquia, a town and municipality in Colombia
  - La Estrella station, a station of the Medellín Metro
- Estrella River (Costa Rica)
- La Estrella, Chiriquí, a corregimiento in Panama

== People ==
=== Given name ===
- Estrella Alfon (1917–1983), Filipina author
- Estrella Archs (born 1974), Spanish fashion designer
- Estrella del Valle (born 1971), Mexican poet
- Estrella Durá (born 1963), Spanish academic and politician
- Estrella Lin (born 1980), Taiwanese singer
- Estrella María Benzo Blas (born 1985), Spanish singer
- Estrella Morente (born 1980), Spanish singer
- Estrella Cabeza Candela (born 1987), Spanish tennis player

=== Surname ===
- Alberto Estrella (born 1962), Mexican actor
- Alvaro Estrella (born 1980), Swedish singer and dancer
- Ana Estrella Santos, Ecuadorian dialectologist and writer
- Conrado Estrella Sr. (1917–2011), Filipino politician
- Conrado Estrella III (born 1960), Filipino politician
- Eduardo Estrella (born 1953), Dominican entrepreneur and politician
- Hony Estrella (born 1984), Dominican actress
- J. P. Estrella (born 2004), American basketball player
- Leo Estrella (born 1975), Dominican baseball player
- Linda Estrella (1922–2012), Filipina actress
- Miguel Ángel Estrella (1940–2022), Argentine pianist and ambassador
- Ulises Estrella (1939–2014), Ecuadorian poet

== Brands and companies ==
- Estrella (snack brand), a Swedish snack food company formerly owned by Kraft Foods
- Estrella Azul, a Panamanian dairy products brand
- Estrella Damm, a Spanish beer
- Estrella Galicia, a Spanish beer
- Kawasaki Estrella, a 250cc motorcycle
- El Tren Estrella, a Spanish night train operated by RENFE rail service

== Film and TV ==
- Estrella TV, an American Spanish-language TV network
- La Estrella (film), a 2013 Spanish film
- Las Estrellas, one of the cornerstone networks of Televisa in Mexico
- Las Estrellas (TV series), a 2017–2018 Argentine telenovela

== Music ==
- Estrella, a section of the piano composition Carnaval by Robert Schumann
- Estrella (album), a 1998 album (and song on that album) by darkwave band Lycia
- "Estrella", a song by Cinerama from their 2002 album Torino
- Estrellas (album), a 1995 album by Gipsy Kings

== Sports ==
- Estrella CF, a football club based in Santa Lucía de Tirajana, Canary Islands, Spain
- Estrellas Poker Tour, a series of poker in Spain
- SV Estrella, a football club based in Papilon, Santa Cruz, Aruba
- UC La Estrella, a football club based in Los Santos de Maimona, Extremadura, Spain

== Other uses ==
- 11697 Estrella, an asteroid
- Estrella, an 1853 British paddle steamship, known as USS Estrella in Union Navy service
- Estrella de Chile (ship), British cargo ship, wrecked 1888
- Estrella War, an annual event in Arizona hosted by the Society for Creative Anachronism
- La Estrella de Panamá, a Panamanian daily newspaper
- Mescinia estrella, a moth of family Pyralidae

== See also ==
- Estrela (disambiguation)
