= Paranormal Witness =

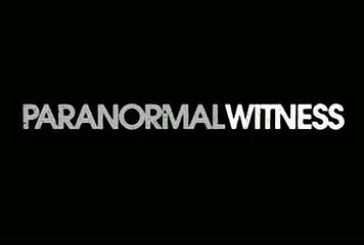
- Series title card
- Also known as: Paranormal Witness: True Terror (2015–2016)'
- Genre: Paranormal; Mystery
- Composers: Joel Beckerman; Ty Unwin
- Country of origin: United States
- Original language: English
- No. of seasons: 5
- No. of episodes: 64

Production
- Executive producers: Bart Layton; Dimitri Doganis
- Producers: Mark Lewis; Simon Mills
- Cinematography: Joel Devlin; Gary Clarke; Will Pugh
- Editors: Julian Hart; Bjorn Johnson; Iain Kitching
- Running time: 60 minutes (inc. adverts)
- Production companies: Realand Productions, LLC; Raw TV

Original release
- Network: Syfy (United States); Really / Watch / Pick (United Kingdom)
- Release: September 7, 2011 – November 27, 2013
- Release: August 26, 2015 – October 26, 2016

Paranormal Witness is an American paranormal docuseries made by a British production company, which described itself as "true tales of supernatural hauntings and explanation-defying paranormal experiences, which are brought to life through recreations". The series premiered on September 7, 2011, on Syfy in the United States. It is also shown in the UK on Really, W, and Pick.

Ranked as one of the top 10 new original series, it was renewed for a 12-episode second season, which premiered on August 8, 2012. Based on the high ratings of the first three episodes of the second season, Paranormal Witness was renewed for a 20-episode third season, which premiered on June 5, 2013.

Although Syfy did not announce the series' renewal following its third-season finale, it was reported that a fourth season had begun filming. On October 29, 2014, the series was officially renewed for a 13-episode fourth season, which premiered on August 26, 2015, under the new title Paranormal Witness: True Terror.

On November 18, 2015, Syfy renewed the series for a 13-episode fifth season, which premiered on August 3, 2016.

== Reception ==
While Deseret News writer Mark Rappleye characterized the show as not "full of mind-numbing creepiness," he said that the show "will likely appeal more to believers and less to the even mildly skeptical." According to Rappleye, "Paranormal Witness” tells the story, insinuating that everyone should believe it as having occurred the way it is presented. This leaves little, if any, room for intellectual challenge or edification." New York Times reviewer Neil Genzlinger criticized the show, saying, "It doesn't bother hunting for hard evidence; it simply uses first-person testimony and re-enactment to sell the idea that someone has had a psychic encounter." Reviewing the show's "Long Island Terror" episode, science writer Sharon A. Hill said, "Paranormal Witness is not what I would consider fair documentation. It is not wise to take TV shows at face value. People put forth their story as they perceive it, but it may not be how others perceive it or how it occurred. Saying there is a demon and Satanic activity associated with the house is a steep claim. Evidence is suggested, but without verification, we can't go anywhere with this story."

== Series overview ==
Season	Episodes	Premiere date	Finale date	Ave. U.S. viewers (millions)
Paranormal Witness series
1	6	7 September 2011	12 October 2011	1.36
2	12	8 August 2012	24 October 2012	1.24
3	20	5 June 2013	27 November 2013	1.09
Paranormal Witness: True Terror series
4	13	28 June 2015	20 September 2015	0.61
5	13	3 August 2016	23 October 2016	0.55

== Episodes ==
=== Season 1 (2011) ===
No. overall	No. in season	Title	Location(s)	Directed by	Original release date	US viewers (millions)
1	1	"Emily the Imaginary Friend/The Lost Girl"	Private home, Baltimore, Maryland Route 136, Live Oak, Florida	Gillian Pachter	September 7, 2011	1.26
In the series premiere, a five-year-old girl, Isabella, claims to have a friendship with a ghost named Emily, who dislikes her parents. While the parents initially believe that Emily is just an imaginary playmate, they realize differently when unusual activities begin taking place in their home. When ordered to stop talking to and playing with Emily, Isabella becomes aggressive and violent, even telling her parents that her and Emily want them dead so that they can play together forever. After the parents attempt to stop their daughter's friendship with the ghost, the activity progressively increases. Unable to cope anymore after a particularly violent attack, the family flees the house, leaving all their possessions behind and refusing to ever go back. Next, a mother and daughter describe their experiences on a dirt road when they come across a girl with no face exactly where a local teenage girl died in a car crash. Later, they find out that other people have seen the faceless girl and that she usually appears around the anniversary of her death, which was only a few days later than the date that the women claim to have encountered the girl on.
2	2	"Haunted Highway/Kentucky UFO Chase"	Bullion Bend, U.S. Route 50, El Dorado County, California, Airspace over Jefferson County, Kentucky	Alex Dunlop	September 14, 2011	1.63
In 1994, a mother and son disappeared near Placerville, California. After multiple motorists report seeing a naked woman lying on the side of the highway, the police eventually discover the family's car, which had veered off the road and into a ditch, along with the dead body of the mother and her unconscious son. Despite the insistence of witnesses that the mother was the naked woman, the medical examiner concludes that she had died on impact, long before the sightings began. Combined with the fact that the dead woman's aunt had a dream that turned out to have been revealing the location of her niece and great-nephew, and the son's memory of a warm presence watching over him after the crash, the family concludes that their daughter's spirit stayed at the scene of her death to protect her son until he could be rescued. Then up next is the story of a police helicopter on a routine flight over Beutil Road near Louisville, Kentucky and its two officers, speculated to have come into contact with a UFO in 1993.
3	3	"The Poltergeist/Watch in the Wilderness"	Private home, Moreno Valley, California Cascade Mountains, Oregon	Diene Petterle	September 21, 2011	1.28
In 2006, a mother, her daughter, and the daughter of her boyfriend claim they are being harassed by a malevolent poltergeist in their new home in California after the boyfriend and his daughter move in. While the woman and girls believe that the activity is paranormal and seek advice from a spiritualist, the boyfriend angrily denies that ghosts are real and blames his girlfriend's daughter for the activity. When the woman buys a small ceramic fugue to offer the Poltergeist as a peace offering (On the advice of the spiritualist), her boyfriend goes into a rage and insists that there is nothing wrong with the house and ultimately ends up taunting the entity and smashing the figurine. Afterwards, the activity increases dramatically, eventually causing the couple to break up. Both families move out after the break-up, and the woman and girls continue insisting that they weren't making things up. Afterward, a former deputy sheriff tells the tale of sighting a creature he could not identify while alone in the Cascade Mountains of the Oregon wilderness in 1997. When he attempts to file a report, he is harassed by his colleagues, who eventually end up revealing to him that there have been multiple reports of similar creatures in that area in recent years.
4	4	"The Haunting of Mansfield Mansion"	Mansfield Mansion, Mansfield, Connecticut	Simon George	September 28, 2011	1.29
When a woman begins renovating a Connecticut mansion on Black Creek Drive in 1994, she supposedly awakens "evil spirits" that terrorize her family and causes several family members, and a friend who later moved in to keep her company, to move out soon after moving in. The woman later discovers the home was part of the Mansfield Training School, a school for the mentally disabled that opened in 1860. The woman begins having reoccurring nightmares where she, in the body of a little girl at the school, is abused and eventually killed by the staff at Mansfield. When the woman's son and his fiance move in with their baby, their son is tormented by an unseen presence, and the woman's nightmares intensify. Eventually, the family decides to break open an eerie cement "box" in the basement and discovers the cremated remains of dozens of people including, it turns out, a young girl.
5	5	"The Dangerous Game/Trumbull County UFO"	Trumbull County, Ohio Private home, Virginia Beach, Virginia	Stephen Kemp	October 5, 2011	1.40
A family claims to be terrorized by a spirit called "Vox," summoned from a Ouija board in Virginia in 2008. Later, they ask a Native American spirit guide to "cleanse" the house. Next, a night of UFO sightings beginning at Sampson Drive in Liberty, Ohio is documented on archival police radio recordings at the Trumbull County 911 Dispatch in 1994.
6	6	"The Rain Man"	Private home and Monroe County Prison, Stroudsburg, Pennsylvania	Neil Rawles	October 12, 2011	1.27
In 1983, a Monroe County Prison convict Don Decker allowed out of jail to attend his abusive grandfather's funeral makes it rain indoors due to an alleged demonic possession.

=== Season 2 (2012) ===
No. overall	No. in season	Title	Location(s)	Directed by	Original release date	US viewers (millions)
7	1	"Man In the Attic"	Private home, San Pedro, California	Stephen Kemp	August 8, 2012	1.18
Between 1988 and 1990, a young mother in suburban California claims to be terrorized by the spirit of an old man in the attic of her home, and a team of paranormal investigators claims to be assaulted by the ghost.
8	2	"Brooklyn Haunting"	Private home, Brooklyn, New York	Dan Clifton	August 15, 2012	1.17
A mother and her two daughters say they are haunted by a spirit who "refused to cross to the other side" after death.
9	3	"Capitol Theatre Haunting"	Capitol Theatre, Salt Lake City, Utah	Dan Clifton	August 22, 2012	1.36
On his new job, a security officer claims to encounter the spirit of a young hero who perished while trying to rescue victims in a fire at the Capitol Theater.
10	4	"The Dybbuk Box"	Addy's Antique Market and private homes, Portland, Oregon; private homes, Kirksville, Missouri	Russell England	August 29, 2012	1.37
An antique shop owner says he inadvertently unleashed a Dybbuk from a locked wine cabinet purchased at an estate auction.
11	5	"Lady on the Stairs"	Private home, Holly, Michigan	Russell England	September 5, 2012	1.32
A woman and her son claim to be haunted by the spirit of a young woman after they move into her new husband's house.
12	6	"The Apartment"	Private home, Chico, California	Richard Curson Smith	September 12, 2012	1.27
After moving into a new apartment, a woman says she experienced progressive dreams of a murder that took place there.
13	7	"The Real Haunting in Connecticut"	Private home, Southington, Connecticut	Sam Hobkinson	September 19, 2012	1.33
When a boy is diagnosed with cancer, his family moves closer to a cancer treatment facility, only to learn that their newly rented house is a former funeral home.
14	8	"Fox Hollow Farm"	Private home, Westfield, Indiana	Ian Clark	September 26, 2012	1.25
A man, his family, and his co-worker/renter move into a "too good to be true" property, later learning it is the former home of alleged serial killer Herb Baumeister.
15	9	"The Abduction"	Apache-Sitgreaves National Forest, Snowflake, Arizona	Stephen Kemp	October 3, 2012	1.17
Eyewitness accounts, original film and audio recordings tell the story of the alien abduction and UFO experience of Arizona logger Travis Walton in 1975. The investigating sheriff and Walton's doctor are interviewed.
16	10	"The Cabin/Ghost in the Garden"	Private home, London, Ohio/private home, Raleigh, North Carolina	Sam Hobkinson and Neil Rawles	October 10, 2012	1.08
After a couple moves into a cabin in the woods, they start to experience regular visits from a creature who they suspect may not be human. Next, a family encounters the presence of a mysterious ghostly girl after moving into their ancestral home.
17	11	"The Hollywood Sign Haunting/The Good Skeleton"	The Hollywood Sign, Los Angeles, California/private home, Yuba City, California	Neil Rawles and Sam Hobkinson	October 17, 2012	1.20
Four friends wonder if they have encountered the legendary "Lady in White" when they meet a woman in a long, white dress while hiking up the Hollywood Hills. A family claims to have a "ghostly protector" in their new home in Yuba City, California.
18	12	"The Tenants"	Private home, Chicago, Illinois	Neil Rawles	October 24, 2012	1.12
A newlywed couple moves into a haunted flat in Chicago.

=== Season 3 (2013) ===
No. overall	No. in season	Title	Location(s)	Directed by	Original release date	US viewers (millions)
19	1	"The Long Island Terror"	Private home, Long Island, New York	Crispin Reece	June 5, 2013	1.08
After losing her husband to a fire, a single mother with two daughters move into a new home. She says the home was used for ritualistic practices and is now a doorway for a demonic entity that torments the family. At one point, evil forces causes her daughter to break a leg; a demon later appeared and scared her. Wanting to be free of the evil haunting the house, the mother has an exorcism performed, during which a demonic entity is seen before vanishing.
20	2	"The Lost Boy"	Private home, Gardner, Massachusetts	Neil Rawles	June 12, 2013	1.18
A couple purchases a Victorian Era home and encounters the spirit of a young boy and something darker, eventually discovering the house is a former brothel and the ghost child may be a prostitute's son.
21	3	"The Curse of Lonergan Farm"	Lonergan Farm, Broken Bow, Nebraska	Russell England	June 19, 2013	1.22
Three brothers reunite on a family farm, only to be haunted by one of their ancestors.
22	4	"Dining With the Dead"	Renovated church turned restaurant, El Paso, Texas	Crispin Reece	June 26, 2013	1.41
A former Spiritualist church undergoes renovations by a couple planning to turn it into a restaurant; however, the process invokes the wrath of something that was summoned during the building's old days as a church.
23	5	"Deliver Us from Evil"	Private home, Kokomo, Indiana	Neil Rawles	July 10, 2013	0.95
A religious family man does battle against a demonic entity that is tormenting his family. The demon attacks his children and somehow defies his strong religious belief.
24	6	"The Hospital Hauntings"	Hospitals across the United States	Carl Hindmarch	July 17, 2013	1.22
The various stories of U.S. hospital patients and workers who have experienced paranormal activity, including an encounter with the Grim Reaper itself.
25	7	"The Manson Curse"	Private home, Los Angeles, California	Will Bridges	July 24, 2013	1.62
A newly built home in California becomes a hotbed of paranormal activity. The spirits in question turn out to be the victims of Charles Manson and his cult.
26	8	"The Bad Man"	Private home, Slanesville, West Virginia	Russell England	July 31, 2013	1.38
A family that moves into a home in a small Southern town experiences activity caused by a malevolent entity named "The Bad Man," who in life was a child molester.
27	9	"The Wolf Pack"	Private home, Palmyra, Maine	Will Bridges	August 7, 2013	1.17
A family moving to a local Maine town are terrorized by werewolf-like beasts.
28	10	"The Saint of Death"	Private home, Juarez, Mexico	Carl Hindmarch	August 14, 2013	1.11
A man is terrorized in his apartment by the patron saint of drug trafficking and criminals.
29	11	"The Lynchville Secret"	Private home, Ponca City, Oklahoma	Sebastian Smith	August 21, 2013	1.03
An Oklahoma family is attacked in their new home by the ghost of a corrupt politician.
30	12	"The House on the Lake"	Private home, Saranac Lake, New York	Julian Hart	August 28, 2013	0.97
A property developer who turned an old lakeside mansion into apartments is unaware that the home was once used as a refuge for tuberculosis sufferers in the 1920s.
31	13	"A Ghostly Affair"	Private home, Monticello, Arkansas	James Bryce	September 11, 2013	1.12
A college educator and his family move into a Victorian era-like home, and soon afterwards the family is terrorized by the visions of the past.
32	14	"Through the Eyes of a Killer"	Private home, Morristown, New Jersey	James Bryce	September 18, 2013	1.12
A psychic has visions of brutal murders at the hands of a serial killer, and assists police in their pursuit of the killer.
33	15	"The Innocent"	Private home, Chilton, Wisconsin	Unknown	September 25, 2013	0.89
A family who moves into a new home in Wisconsin learns that it used to be a foster home from a former occupant and of a tragic incident that took place there 45 years before, and is what's responsible for the strange phenomena they have been experiencing.
34	16	"The Coven"	Private home, Abbeville, South Carolina	Unknown	October 2, 2013	1.08
A family moves into a new home & soon starts experiencing paranormal activity, which may be the result of rituals performed by a coven of witches.
35	17	"The Visitors"	Private home, Arlington, Texas	Unknown	November 6, 2013	1.10
A Texas man witnesses a bizarre ritual being performed, yet an evil paranormal entity follows him home and creates havoc.
36	18	"The Harpy"	Private home, Atchison, Kansas	Unknown	November 13, 2013	1.18
The Pickman family and their encounter with an alleged spirit that named itself "Sallie" haunting their Kansas home, but things take a turn for the worse when suspicion states that Sallie is actually something much more evil masquerading as a human and tourturing the family.
37	19	"The Exorcist"	Private home, Indianapolis, Indiana and Rome, Italy	Unknown	November 20, 2013	0.89
An exorcist battles against a demonic force possessing an Indiana woman.
38	20	"The Rendlesham Files"	Rendlesham Forest, Suffolk, England	Unknown	November 27, 2013	N/A
A retelling of the Rendlesham Forest incident where a military base, RAF Woodbridge was visited by a supposed alien craft.

=== Season 4 (2015) ===
No. overall	No. in season	Title	Location(s)	Directed by	Original release date	US viewers (millions)
39	1	"The Motel"	Windrift Motel, Madison, Indiana	Crispin Reece	August 26, 2015	0.61
In the 1980s, a new family starts up a motel business in Indiana that is adjacent to their new home, unfortunately for them. The property is the dwelling ground of unspeakable evil. The forces that torment them do not come to light until the homeowners decide to renovate the building.
40	2	"A Nightmare on Chestnut Street"	Private home, Kent, Ohio	Neil Rawles	September 2, 2015	0.77
Ohio college students rent a home for their final year of school, however they find themselves thrown into a reign of terror by a spirit who is angry that her murderer, who killed her years before the tenants moved in, has never been brought to justice.
41	3	"The Molech"	Private home, Brentwood, Pennsylvania	David Belton	September 9, 2015	0.62
In a retelling of the infamous 'Demon of Brownsville Road' story, a politician from Pittsburgh moves to the suburbs with his family, only to learn he is opposed by the spirit of a former doctor who performed illegal abortions, using the babies as sacrifices to an entity the doctor had worshipped while in the home, an ancient demonic force known as Moloch, which retaliates once the family attempts to seek help from an exorcist.
42	4	"Suzy Doll"	Private home, West Haven, Connecticut	David Bartlett	September 16, 2015	0.53
In 1983, a little girl from New England received a strange doll as a birthday present, little did her family know that the doll is a source of absolute darkness that is intent on stealing the soul of the daughter to whom it was given.
43	5	"Poppy's Revenge"	Private home, North East, Pennsylvania	Will Bridges	September 23, 2015	0.76
A teenager girl and her sister are raised by their grandfather. Poppy (the grandfather's nickname) is extremely close and borderline possessive of the oldest sister. When she is offered a job at a radio station far enough away from Poppy's house that she would have to move out, he is livid. Before she leaves, he makes her promise that she will come back.
44	6	"The Dark Pond"	Private home, Ashland, Ohio	Neil Rawles	September 30, 2015	0.75
A family moved into an old Victorian's house, with a pond in the backyard. One day strange occurrences happened inside the house; in the meantime, outside, a dark force is leading Lilly, the little girl, to the dark pond.
45	7	"Demon House"	Private home, Springfield, Louisiana	Will Bridges	October 7, 2015	0.55
Jeanine and A.J. think they have found their dream home but are rudely awakened by the terror Jeanine faces. With her poor health on the line and the demon, which is ruining her life, it is hard for them to continue.
46	8	"Sacred Ground"	Private home, Loess Hills, Onawa, Iowa	Crispin Reece	October 14, 2015	0.57
The Leidel family, parents and two teenagers, speak about what happened to them after moving into a house in 2010. The mother, Christi, and her daughter began experiencing things they couldn't explain, including seeing Native people in the home who quickly disappear. The two of them, not believed by the father and son, leave the house for a while. While away, the father and son also witness the Natives among other strange activity. After Christi returns she learns that their home was built on sacred Native land and blesses the house with sage in an attempt to have the unwanted presence leave. The family thought the spirits had moved on until Christmas day when they awoke to find all the decorations stripped from the Christmas tree and the ball ornaments suspended in midair in three vertical lines before falling. They then moved out.
47	9	"The Fireplace"	Private apartment, Washington, Missouri	Crispin Reece	October 21, 2015	0.51
Linda Coddington, her sister, her cousin, and her friend recount their paranormal experiences which occurred in Linda's apartment in 1984. Pregnant with her second child she moved into the apartment of an old house. Upon arriving she finds a necklace with a pentagram design and the fireplace securely boarded up. Over a few months she and her child, her sister, cousin, and friend witness paranormal activity including a large bed moved without explanation, the fireplace barrier rattling, dishes being pulled out of the cabinets onto the floor, and blood dripped around her baby in his crib. A priest performed an exorcism in the home but it didn't hold. Linda moved out and upon seeing the necklace again remembered from her childhood that at the time an elderly woman people called a witch lived in the house.
48	10	"The Real Conjuring"	Private home, Harrisville, Rhode Island	Sebastian Smith	October 28, 2015	0.59
The Perron Family give their account of what they experienced after moving into their new home in 1971. Up to 1980 when they left the house, members of the family of eight had various paranormal events occur in the home such as being trapped in a box with no latch or lock and nothing pressing on the lid, shared dreams, awaking with unexplained cuts, oddly dropping temperatures, feeling a hand on their back when no one was present, and doors moving without cause. The mother, Carolyn, researched the property and found many deaths and a woman named Bathsheba who was rumored to be "in league with the devil" and sacrificed an infant. Paranormal investigators Ed and Lorraine Warren visited the family's home, and Lorraine "sensed a malignant presence" and produced the name Bathsheba. The Warren couple, a medium, and Carolyn conducted a séance in which she became possessed. These events were the basis of the 2013 horror film The Conjuring.
49	11	"When Hell Freezes Over"	Private home, Hinesburg, Vermont	David Bartlett	November 4, 2015	0.51
Kristel Smart and her family move into a late 19th Century house in Hinesburg on Pond Brook Road at Rhode Island Corners that was allegedly built over the ruins of a church that was burned with the congregation inside in the early 1800s. The family experiences disembodied voices, objects moving by themselves, scratches, and the appearance of ghostly processions.
50	12	"Beneath the Rock"	OP Rock, Afghanistan	Sebastian Smith	November 11, 2015	0.55
A U.S. military detachment experiences haunting activity at a camp called "OP Rock" in rural Afghanistan. They experience full bodied apparitions, disembodied voices, weapon and equipment malfunctions, and objects moving by themselves. The activity intensifies after they dig up human remains with effects around it written in Russian. They find out that extremists decapitated captured Russian soldiers on the rock during the Soviet-Afghan War in the 1980s.
51	13	"Ashes to Ashes"	Private home, Whittier, California	David Belton	November 18, 2015	0.54
Amanda brings her family into her grandmothers house shortly after she passes away, only to realize that her grandmother's twin sister is terrorizing her daughter and husband.

=== Season 5 (2016) ===
No. overall	No. in season	Title	Location(s)	Directed by	Original release date	US viewers (millions)
52	1	"Voodoo Preacher"	Private home, Rockford, Alabama	Russell Eatough	August 3, 2016	0.60
A family moves into a home haunted by a voodoo spirit.
53	2	"They Are Mine"	Private home, Savannah, Georgia	Elliot Goldner	August 10, 2016	0.42
Three college roommates are tormented by the spirit of a dead junkie.
54	3	"From H.E.L.L"	Private homes, Houston, Texas	Russell Eatough	August 17, 2016	0.51
A young girl breaks the rules of the Ouija board, inviting an evil spirit into her home.
55	4	"The Contract"	Private home, Bowling Green, Kentucky	Elliot Goldner	August 24, 2016	0.60
A young man faces the consequences of a deal with the devil he made as a teenager.
56	5	"Zozo"	Private home, Lawton, Oklahoma	Matthew Catling	August 31, 2016	0.65
A war vet and his family move into a new home, only to be tormented by a demonic entity.
57	6	"The Mothman Curse"	Point Pleasant, West Virginia and private home, rural Maryland	Matthew Catling	September 7, 2016	0.54
After a trip to Point Pleasant, a couple is tormented by the mysterious entity known as Mothman.
58	7	"Nebraska Fiend"	Farm, Norman, Nebraska	Sebastian Smith	September 14, 2016	0.51
A family moves into a new home, only to be haunted by the spirit of serial killer Stephen D. Richards.
59	8	"The Pit"	Private home, Santa Susana, California	Sebastian Smith	September 21, 2016	0.47
A woman buys a house in a rough neighborhood, and is haunted by the spirit of another woman who was murdered there.
60	9	"The Ranch"	Ranch, Abilene, Texas	Harry Hewland	September 28, 2016	0.57
After taking in their dying grandmother, a family is haunted by wolf-like spirits.
61	10	"The Jail"	Estrella Jail, Phoenix, Arizona	Alexandra Lacey	October 5, 2016	0.56
Guards and inmates of a state prison are driven to madness by the spirits haunting its halls.
62	11	"The Hotel"	Lemp Mansion, St. Louis, Missouri	Harry Hewland	October 12, 2016	0.57
A hotel is haunted by the spirit of the land's previous owner.
63	12	"The Mojave Encounter"	Asheville, North Carolina and the Mid Hills, California	Neil Rawles	October 19, 2016	0.47
A married couple undergo hypnosis to remember missing time from an alien abduction.
64	13	"The Night Ward"	South Pittsburg Municipal Hospital, South Pittsburg, Tennessee	Unknown	October 26, 2016	0.62
A team of paranormal investigators spend a night in an abandoned hospital with a history of hauntings.
