= Vincent Darré =

French stylist and interior designer (b. 1959)

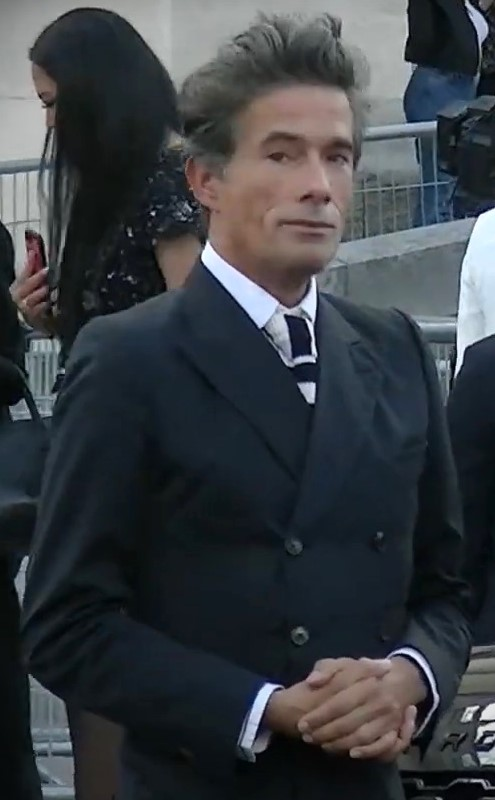
Darré in 2019

Vincent Darré (born 13 January 1959) is a French stylist and interior designer. From 1995 to 2001, he was the assistant of Karl Lagerfeld. Later, he was the head designer at Moschino, then the artistic director of Ungaro. He currently designs interiors and furniture.

== Early life ==
Darré was born in Paris on 13 January 1959. His parents were intellectuals, his father was a communist sociologist and his mother is described as a "feminist, bohemian". His uncle is the Spanish writer and politician Jorge Semprún. He attended the École alsacienne. He studied at the fashion design school Studio Berçot in Paris.

At the end of the 1970s, Darré met the disc jockey Philippe Krootchey and regularly attended La Main bleue, a nightclub in Montreuil opened by François Baudot and Philippe Starck. There he was part of a "gang" composed among others of Eva Ionesco, Christian Louboutin, Edwige Belmore, Farida and Djemila Khelfa. They became regulars at Le Palace after he begged Fabrice Emaer to let them in when they first tried to attend. He was noticed there for his offbeat and somewhat eccentric outfits. In the exclusive and unmissable discotheque of the era, he rubbed shoulders with Olivia Putman, Pierre Le-Tan, and met Paquita Paquin, Azzedine Alaïa, and Arielle Dombasle.

== Career ==
After graduation, Darré worked for the couture house of Yves Saint Laurent, but found it boring and old fashioned and left after only a few months. He then worked for Claude Montana. After there, he worked a number of jobs in Italy, including at Prada.

From 1995 to 2001, Darré worked for Karl Lagerfeld at Fendi. In 2001, he became the head designer of Moschino. In 2004, he became artistic director of Ungaro. He was fired from the company after two seasons. According to him, he "took a step back and realized that when I was designing furniture, I was having a blast."

In June 2008, Darré opened his home gallery, Maison Darré, at 32 Rue du Mont Thabor in Paris. He traveled to India, Venice, and Vietnam to find artisans to craft his "Tim Burton-esque designs". He offered one-off pieces and small editions of certain designs which included rugs, consoles, and lighting fixtures. His offerings were similar to the decor of his "grand" Left Bank apartment which he "decorated with skulls, vintage medical equipment and 3-D anatomy charts" and "groovy midcentury Knoll chairs, Venetian mirrors and quirky, Baroque candelabras."

In 2008, Darré was hired by André and Olivier Zahm to decorate Le Baron in New York. Then at 21 Place Vendôme, in the salons of Schiaparelli with decoration described as "whimsical", he recreated the surrealist and offbeat atmosphere of the past in a heterogeneous way, through furniture of his own creation, associated with paintings by Pierre Le-Tan, drawings by Jean Cocteau, old mirrors by Saint Laurent and all sorts of objects. In March 2014, he was announced as part of the gastronomic and cultural project "La Jeune Rue". The following year, he decorated the six suites of the Hôtel Montana by Jean-Yves Le Fur near the Café de Flore, whose bar he had already decorated a few years earlier; he mixed aesthetically varied pieces with his own creations, establishing a different style on each floor. At the end of 2015, he created a surrealist collection of furniture inspired by Salvador Dali.

In 2013, Darré became a regular contributor to L'Officiel serving as a curator for several issues per year. He includes his drawings and invited his friends Bernard Chapuis, Philippe Azoury, and Paquita Paquin to participate in the magazine.

In 2016, Darré auctioned off the contents of his Parisian apartment through the auction house Piasa. He stated that the sale was part of a "desire to re-invent myself."

In March 2017, Darré opened a new apartment showroom at 17 Rue Royale in Paris.

At the end of 2022, Darré staged 200 pieces dating from the 1930s to the 1950s from the collections of the Mobilier National in the Gobelins Manufactory and had personalized sets made for the event.

== In film ==
Darré had a small role in the 2000 film Scénarios sur la drogue, in an episode directed by Guillaume Canet, in Mon Idole in 2002, and in Michel Vaillant in 2003. He was responsible for the costumes in the 2004 TV film Milady by Josée Dayan.

== Publications ==
- Marie-France Boyer; Vincent Darré (December 2018). Rizzoli Flammarion (ed.). Intérieurs surréalistes (in French). New York: Rizzoli. ISBN 978-0-8478-6461-4.
- The Little Theater of Vincent Darré (2022)
