= Drug Scenes =

2000 French short film series

- Release date: 2000
- Country: France

Drug Scenes (original French title Scénarios sur la drogue, also titled Drugs!) is an omnibus film (2000) of 24 French short films depicting drug abuse. Varying in length from three to seven minutes, they showed in cinemas before feature films.

The films included in Drug Scenes include:

Title	Director	Idea	Cast	Plot	Length (in min)
Avalanche	Jean-Christophe Pagnac	Jean-René Dard	Lou Doillon, Vincent Darré, Francis Renaud	A pair believes they have their drugs under control.	4'15
Le bistrot	Georges Lautner	Benoît Roux	Jacques Martial, Philippe Carta, Jacky Delory	In the morning at a bar in Nice sits a young man alone at his table..	4'58
Cake	Jean-Louis Tribes	Aurore Patris	Sophie Mounicot, Nathalie Jolie	One child gets the drugs store of his father and bakes so that a "Brownie"..	4'41
C'est presque terrible	Lionel Mougin	Marc Picavez	Milo Brutillot, Michel Chays, Gilberte Boucard	Two farmers from Jura discuss in the kitchen with a glass of wine.	6'10
Chienne de vie	Henri-Paul Korchia	Soraya Ben Mouffok	Bernard Azimuth, Audrey Bonnefoy, Christian Crevillent, Frédéric Paquier	A woman is admonished by her physician to smoke no more cannabis and hen turns the tables around.	4'09
Déçue	Isabelle Dinelli	Soraya Ben Mouffok	Éva Darlan, Valérie Benguigui, Laure Killing, Julien Peny	A mother discovered in the cluttered room of her son a cannabis joint and tried this out with her friend.	4'45
Dernière année	Fred Journet; Bernard Schoukroun	Jérôme Benoît	Laura Favali, Alicia Sportiello, Docteur Meynial, Michel Bonjour, Jacques Sandrars	Fictitious documentary about a medical student who supplied a dormitory with amphetamines and tranquilizers.	5'09
Drugstore	Marion Vernoux	Eric Ellena	Valeria Bruni Tedeschi, Chloé Mons, Marco Cherqui, Frédérique Revuz, Franck Demules	In a shop where all kinds of drugs are available, a customer's indecision riles the seller.	4'54
Ecsta-ordinaire	Manuel Boursinhac	Robin Gairaud	Amandine Chauveau, Lorànt Deutsch, Rudi Rosenberg, Pierre Kaldfate	A young couple meets one evening. To impress his girlfriend, the boy brings something extraordinary.	5'05
La famille médicament	Étienne Chatiliez	Hervé Perouze	Nathalie Richard, Marvyn Pautasso, Hugo Naccache, Jonathan Reyes, Morgan Simon	To get away from her daily routine with her four children, a young mother consumes drugs.	4'25
La faute au vent	Emmanuelle Bercot	Nadége Rolland	Chiara Mastroianni, Jean-François Xavier Vlimant, Yves Verhoeven	A young, drug-addicted mother meets with her toddler her dealer who wants to sell her because of their financial problems for free.	6'40
Hier, tu m'as dit demain	Vincent Perez	François Leray	Mathieu Delarive, Gisèle Calmy-Guyot, Frédérique Bauer	Having no money for drugs, a man decides to rob an elderly woman.	4'50
Jour de manque	Jean-Teddy Filippe	David Bouttin	Tara Römer, Manuel Bonnet, Henri Schmitt, Claude Vallère	A lad, suffering from withdrawal symptoms, tries to borrow money from his grandparents.	4'31
Journée ordinaire	Françoise Huguier	Nathalie Behague	Yannick Soulier	A young drug addict tries to fight again his addiction and to defeat it within 24 days in jail.	4'20
Kino	Alain Beigel	Valdo Dos Santos	Abdel Allouach, Philippe Frécon, Jean-Michel Marnet, Marc Rubes, Alain Vinot	In a boxing match one of the two opponents is under the influence of drugs.	4'00
Lucie	Guillaume Nicloux	Sébastien Roch	Sylvie Testud, Anne Charrier, Samir Guesmi, Yves Verhoeven, Juliette Meyniac, Julie Messéan, Nicolas Simon	A young girl has been invited to a party. Before she leaves the house, she sits still a shot.	4'17
Les mots attendront	Franck Chiche	Béatrice Guéret	Caroline Mouton, Pierre Richard, Alexandra Youanovitch, Carine Schraub, Marie Le Cam	In a bus rampaging students encounter a wavering man.	5'25
Papa was a Rolling Stone	Jean Bocheux	Nadjeda Mohamed, Hassima Belkacem, Naïma Righi	Jérémie Lippmann, Jean-Louis Tribes, Morgane Keo Kasal	A father accuses his son to take ecstasy, which he found in one of his jacket pockets.	4'29
La purée	Seb Lelouch; Simon Lelouch	Lelia Fremovici	Darry Cowl, Sophie Hardy, Aurélien Wiik	A young guy arrives at his grandparents to eat, but he must send them a worrying message.	5'53
Quand j'étais petit	Arnaud Sélignac	Gilles Romele	Antoine du Merle, Michèle Garcia, Pascal Daubias, Julie Urtado-Guiraud	Surrealistic film about drug seen with the eyes of a child.	4'10
La rampe	Santiago Otheguy	Stéphane Olijnyki	Claude Jade, Jean Allain, Hugo Mayer, Cécile Bodis, Marianne Liechty	As the elevator is manned, a middle-aged elegant woman must take the stairs under the gaze of their neighbors. What's her secret?	5'54
Speed ball	Laurent Bouhnik	Sandra Stadeli	Manuel Blanc, Enrico Mattaroccia, Jean-Pierre Jacovella, Alexandre Pottier, Franck Gourlat	Under the load, always wanting to be the best, an employee of an aircraft manufacturer engages to cocaine .	6'10
T'en as	Antoine de Caunes	Jacques Dangoin	Alexis Smolen, Carmel O'Driscoll, Enrico Mattaroccia, Anne Fassio, Vincent Lecoeur	A dealer meets with his customers.	3'11
Tube du jour	Diane Bertrand	Monelle Baude	Arianne Mallet, Laurence Côte, Clio Lellouche	A little girl suffers from loneliness and need to take care of her mother at the same time.	4'09
