= Venetian Lady =

Charter yacht based in Miami, Florida, U.S.

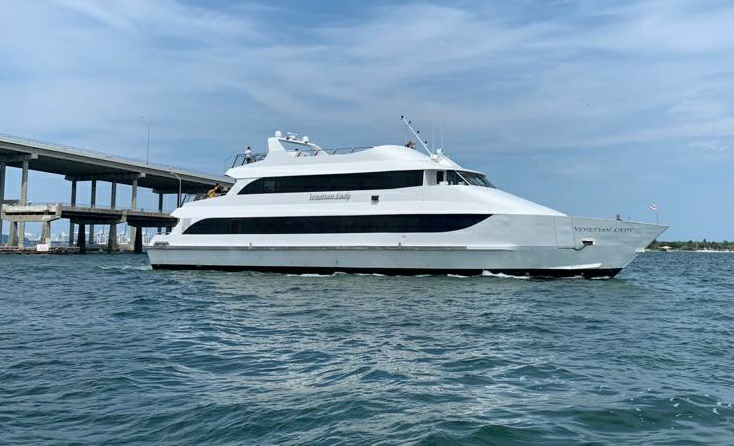

History
- Name: Venetian Lady
- Operator: Biscayne Lady Cruises Inc
- Port of registry: Miami, FL, US
- Builder: Island Boats
- Cost: $5,000,000
- Launched: 2007
- Identification: MMSI number: 367168340; Callsign: WDD6104

General characteristics
- Tonnage: 431 GT ITC or 91 GRT
- Length: 130 ft (40 m)
- Beam: 28.2 ft (8.6 m)
- Decks: 3
- Installed power: Caterpillar
- Propulsion: Diesel Reduction

Venetian Lady is a 130-foot (40 m) charter yacht based in Miami, Florida. It is the second vessel of the Biscayne Lady Yacht Charters fleet, following four years after the launch of Biscayne Lady.

On October 2, 2007 Venetian Lady was given an introductory celebration in Miami Beach. Docked together with Biscayne Lady, the two vessels invited guests on board for food, drink, and music. The christening of Venetian Lady followed later that evening, accompanied by Stuart Blumberg, president and CEO of the Greater Miami and the Beaches Hotel Association.

== Notable charters ==
In 2007, Venetian Lady was used as the site of an elimination challenge in episode 12 of Top Chef: Miami. For this event, the yacht was chartered by Pure Nightclub for fashion designer Esteban Cortázar and 60 guests.

In 2014, NBA player Dwyane Wade rented out Venetian Lady to celebrate his 32nd birthday. For this event, the yacht was given an extensive custom wrap job both inside and out.
