= Mescinia texanica =

Scientific classification
- Kingdom: Animalia
- Phylum: Arthropoda
- Class: Insecta
- Order: Lepidoptera
- Family: Pyralidae
- Genus: Mescinia
- Species: M. texanica

Binomial name
- Mescinia texanica Neunzig, 1997

Species of moth

Mescinia texanica is a species of snout moth in the genus Mescinia. It was described by Herbert H. Neunzig in 1997 and is known from the US states of Texas(from which its species epithet is derived) and California.
