= Mescinia =

Scientific classification
- Kingdom: Animalia
- Phylum: Arthropoda
- Class: Insecta
- Order: Lepidoptera
- Family: Pyralidae
- Subfamily: Phycitinae
- Genus: Mescinia; Hampson in Ragonot, 1901

Genus of moths

Mescinia is a genus of snout moths described by George Hampson in 1901.

== Species ==
- Mescinia berosa Dyar, 1914
- Mescinia commatella Zeller, 1881
- Mescinia estrella Barnes & McDunnough, 1913
- Mescinia parvula (Zeller, 1881)
- Mescinia texanica Neunzig, 1997
- Mescinia triloses Dyar, 1914
