= Mescinia commatella =

Scientific classification
- Kingdom: Animalia
- Phylum: Arthropoda
- Clade: Pancrustacea
- Class: Insecta
- Order: Lepidoptera
- Family: Pyralidae
- Genus: Mescinia
- Species: M. commatella

Binomial name
- Mescinia commatella Zeller, 1881

Species of moth

Mescinia commatella is a species of snout moth in the genus Mescinia. It was described by Zeller in 1881. It is found in Colombia.
