= Mescinia triloses =

Scientific classification
- Kingdom: Animalia
- Phylum: Arthropoda
- Class: Insecta
- Order: Lepidoptera
- Family: Pyralidae
- Genus: Mescinia
- Species: M. triloses

Binomial name
- Mescinia triloses Dyar, 1914

Synonyms
- Mescinia mosces Dyar, 1914

Species of moth

Mescinia triloses is a species of snout moth in the genus Mescinia. It was described by Harrison Gray Dyar Jr. in 1914. It is found in Panama.
