= Mescinia berosa =

Scientific classification
- Kingdom: Animalia
- Phylum: Arthropoda
- Class: Insecta
- Order: Lepidoptera
- Family: Pyralidae
- Genus: Mescinia
- Species: M. berosa

Binomial name
- Mescinia berosa Dyar, 1914

Species of moth

Mescinia berosa is a species of snout moth in the genus Mescinia. It was described by Harrison Gray Dyar Jr. in 1914 and is known from Panama (including Rio Trinidad, the type location) and Puerto Rico.
