= Emanuel Ungaro =

French fashion designer (1933–2019)

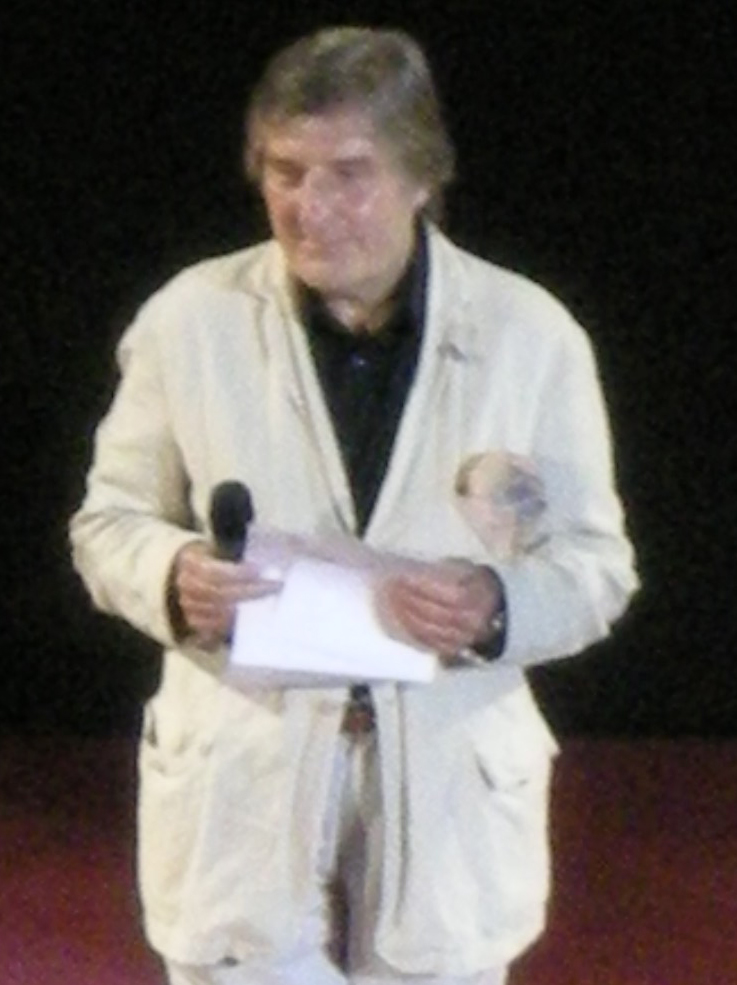
- Emanuel Ungaro in 2009
- Born: 13 February 1933; Aix-en-Provence, France
- Died: 21 December 2019 (aged 86); Paris, France
- Label: House of Emanuel Ungaro
- Awards: Legion d'Honneur
- Website: www.ungaro.com

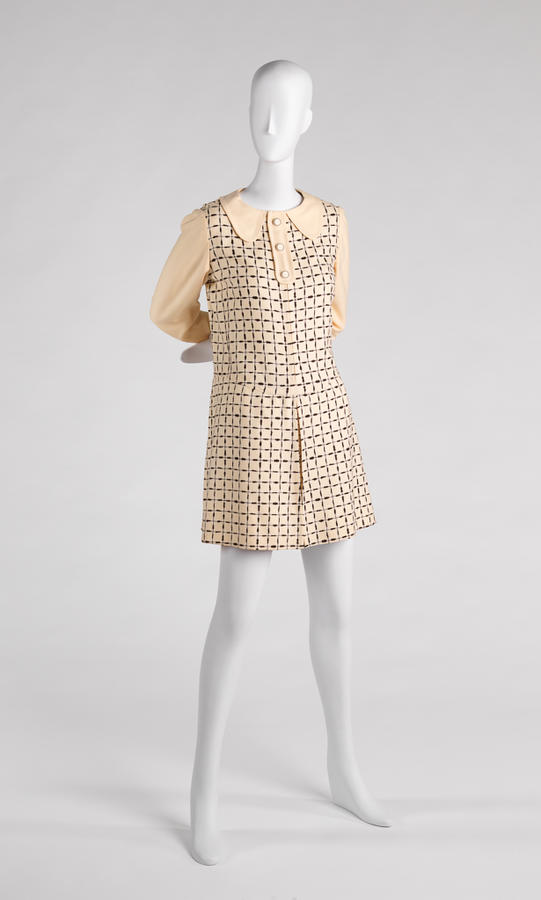
1968 minidress by Emanuel Ungaro, (RISD Museum)

Emanuel Ungaro (13 February 1933 – 21 December 2019) was a French fashion designer who founded his eponymous fashion house in 1965.

== Early life ==
Ungaro's Italian father fled to France from Francavilla Fontana of Brindisi province because of the fascist dictatorship in Italy. Ungaro's father was a tailor and he gave his son a sewing machine when he was young.

== The House of Emanuel Ungaro ==
At the age of 22, Ungaro moved to Paris. Three years later he began designing for the House of Cristóbal Balenciaga for three years before quitting to work for Courrèges. Four years later, in 1965 with the assistance of Swiss artist Sonja Knapp and Elena Bruna Fassio, Ungaro opened his own fashion house in Paris. The opening came while Courrèges was at the peak of his success but on hiatus and Ungaro's similar style gained him immediate followers.

During the mid- to late 1960s, Ungaro was known as one of the Space Age designers, alongside Andre Courrèges, Pierre Cardin, Paco Rabanne, Rudi Gernreich, Jean-Marie Armand, and Diana Dew, creating ultra-modern, futuristic clothing of stark simplicity consisting of flaring, mini-length garments of geometric shape in welt-seamed double-faced wools, synthetics, plastics, and metals worn with high boots, helmets, visors, and chrome and plastic jewelry. Sonia Knapp designed his prints, footwear was provided by Roger Vivier, and hair was styled by Vidal Sassoon and Alexandre. He was known for including shorts with his minidresses to make mini lengths easier to wear. His designs were said to be strongly influenced by former employer Courrèges, a claim Ungaro contested, saying that he and Courrèges merely shared an esthetic sense derived from their training at Balenciaga. He was one of a small number of designers, Courrèges among them, who continued to show futuristic Space Age styles for several years after other designers had given them up.

His womenswear designs of the 1970s were noted for their exuberant mixing of Sonia Knapp's colorful prints. In the year 1970, he moved away from his long-held Space Age styles and adopted the longer, looser, more flowing look that had been burgeoning among the fashion-conscious since the late sixties. He helped instigate the decade's characteristic layered look in 1971 before settling in to the voluminous, layered, peasant-based styles known as the Big Look or Soft Look that dominated high fashion from 1974 to 1978. Ungaro's print mixtures fit well into the period's multi-layer esthetic. The raincoats he produced during the seventies were widely admired as well.

In the late 1970s, fashion journalist Michael Roberts, when opening a Sunday column in The Times, said "Emanuel Ungaro has a great charm. He wears it around his neck."

Ungaro would see unprecedented fame in the 1980s. While his talent was recognized in the 1970s, fashion observers felt that he hadn't yet found a signature style but that, if he ever did, he could become one of the biggest names in Paris. The vehicle for such a rise came with the fashion industry's Fall 1978 revival of big shoulders, narrow skirts, and, particularly relevant for Ungaro's future, 1940s-style shirring. Ungaro wouldn't immediately take up these revived proportions, but during the eighties he would reach a pinnacle of success and influence with his versions of the look, as he interpreted the era's aggressive, broad-shouldered women's silhouette with Edwardian-style shirring and draping and his trademark eye-catching prints to create a voluptuous, very feminine, even coquettish look that was highly popular with the public. He cited Beethoven string quartets as inspiring his work during this period.

French actress Anouk Aimée was a longtime friend and inspiration to Ungaro, who spoke of her as a personal muse and featured her in advertising campaigns during the 1980s.

Ungaro launched his first menswear collection, Ungaro Uomo, in 1973, and his first perfume, Diva, 10 years later in 1983. Ungaro was a participant in The Battle of Versailles Fashion Show held on 28 November 1973. Later followed the perfumes Senso (1987), Ungaro (1991) and Emanuel Ungaro For Men (1991).

By 1989, Ungaro was producing two haute couture collections a year, two women's ready-to-wear (labelled "Parallèle", begun in 1971), as well as lower-priced diffusion lines "Ter" (1988 to 1991) and "Solo Donna". That year a scholarship was funded in his name at the School of the Art Institute of Chicago, endowed by Marshall Field's in recognition of his legacy as a designer.

Menswear lines included "Classics by Ungaro" and "Ungaro pour l'Homme Paris". Lines not designed by Ungaro himself included "Emanuel by Emanuel Ungaro", a women's line introduced specifically for the US market in 1991, "Emanuel Petite" in 1994, and "Ungaro Woman", a plus-size line added in 1996.

In 1996, he formed a partnership with Salvatore Ferragamo. In Ungaro's obituary, The Guardian notes that his 30 years without outside investment ending in 1996 made him "the last independent in Paris":

Lack of funding shaped his own business. In 1968, he added ready-to-wear, sold at first from his salon on the Avenue Montaigne, then distributed in the US and Japan, for a reliable revenue stream to help support his couture without pursuing the licensing deals that had become standard for couturiers. He profited only from what his house directly made, not from selling the name to producers whose output quality he could not control.

In 1997, Ungaro, Ferragamo and Bulgari created a new company: Emanuel Ungaro Parfums. The new perfumes to follow were Fleur de Diva (1997), Desnuda (2001) and Apparition (2004).

=== Under Giambattista Valli, 1998–2004 ===
Giambattista Valli worked as Creative Director for Ungaro from 1998 to 2004. Ungaro credited Valli with revitalizing the house, and named him as his successor. In a tribute after Ungaro's death, Valli was quoted by Vogue as saying "He was one of the big masters of haute couture, with a very personal kind of universe.... We worked in parallel a lot, he on the haute couture, and me on the ready-to-wear. For seven years I learned a lot from him. He was not listening to critics, just his own dreams and obsessions."

In 2005, Ungaro retired and Gruppo Ferragamo sold the label to internet entrepreneur Asim Abdullah for US$84 million.

=== Various artistic directors, 2005–2024 ===
After the sale, the label languished with a revolving door of designers – Vincent Darré and Peter Dundas –, the last of which, Esteban Cortazar, who was appointed in 2007, was fired two years later after his refusal to work with actress Lindsay Lohan. Subsequently, Lohan was appointed Artistic Director, working with new head designer Estrella Archs, who was hired hastily to replace Cortazar. The introduction of Lohan, which was meant to give the label publicity, was received with shock and dismay in Paris Fashion Week 2009. In 2010, during Paris Fashion Week, Lohan announced that she was no longer working for or with Ungaro, and that she could not comment on the matter because of legal issues. Her work was heavily criticized and soon after the fashion house was looking for a buyer.

In 2009, the label had sales of about $200 million from fragrance and less-expensive lines sold in Asia, but the runway collection has been losing money for years.

In April 2010, it was announced that Archs had been dismissed and British designer Giles Deacon would be taking over as creative director.

In 2012, Italian company Aeffe took over the production and distribution of Ungaro products. In September 2012, Fausto Puglisi was named creative director of Ungaro, and the brand announced its comeback to the Paris Fashion Week. In 2015, Ungaro launched a smart ring that, connected to a phone, vibrates discreetly instead of lighting up when one exclusive contact calls. In March 2017, Fausto Puglisi was replaced by Marco Colagrossi (formerly women's wear at Giorgio Armani) as creative director of Ungaro.

=== Possible acquisition by Law Roach ===
In 2025, Puck reported that American-stylist Law Roach and a group of financial backers are preparing to purchase the house from Abdullah.

== Designers and creative directors ==
- Emanuel Ungaro (1965–
- Giambattista Valli (1998–2004)
- Vincent Darré (2004–2005)
- Peter Dundas (2005–2007)
- Esteban Cortázar (2007–2009)
- Estrella Archs (2009–2010)
- Lindsay Lohan (as 'artistic advisor', 2009–2010)
- Giles Deacon (2010–2012)
- Fausto Puglisi (2012–2017)
- Marco Colagrossi (2017–2020)
- Kobi Halperin (2021–present)

== Fragrance ==
In 2008, Avon and Emanuel Ungaro collaborated to launch a new duo of fragrances, U by Ungaro for Her and U by Ungaro for Him. Actress Reese Witherspoon served as the scents' spokeswoman.

- Avon U by Ungaro For Her was developed by perfumers Jean Marc Chaillan and Loc Dong, and the "fresh, woody floral" includes notes of bergamot blossom, freesia, pepper blossom, acacia aura, lotus flower, osmanthus, iris, sandalwood and musk.
- Avon U by Ungaro For Him was developed by Yves Cassar and Pascal Gaurin, and the "woody aromatic watery blend" features green mandarin leaf, ruby red grapefruit, pomegranate, immortelle, cardamom, cedar leaf, vetiver, patchouli, sandalwood, tonka bean and Balsam of Peru.

== Personal life ==
In 1988, Ungaro married Laura Bernabei. He has a daughter, Cosima Ungaro, born in Neuilly-sur-Seine, but her birthdate has been kept a secret.

Ungaro died in December 2019 at the age of 86. He had reportedly been ill for two years previous.
