= Estrella Archs =

Spanish fashion designer

- Born: 1974 (age 51–52); Barcelona, Spain
- Education: Central Saint Martins College of Art and Design

Estrella Archs (born 1974) is a Spanish fashion designer. She graduated from the Central Saint Martins College of Art and Design and worked for Spanish Vogue. Archs launched her own line in 2007 at Paris Fashion Week, where she has since unveiled all of her collections. She has worked for many fashion houses including Pucci and The House of Emanuel Ungaro.

== Career ==
Archs is a graduate from Central Saint Martins College of Art and Design. Archs has worked for Hussein Chalayan, Pucci, Cacharel, Miuccia Prada, and Nina Ricci. She has also worked as a fashion journalist for Spanish Vogue. Archs launched her first collection in 2007 and continues to show at Paris Fashion Week. Of Archs' style, Elisabeta Tudor of Sleek said "Always exploring the female nature while playing with simple yet sophisticated silhouettes in her collections, Estrella's love for pure and sensual forms reaches its peak in her eponymous label founded in 2007."

In 2009, Archs took over the position of head designer at fashion house Ungaro, replacing Esteban Cortazar. Archs worked with American film actress Lindsay Lohan, who was hired as Ungaro's artistic director, on her first collection for the house. In April 2010, it was announced that Archs had left the company. Archs' spokesperson said "Estrella Archs announces that she has left her job as chief designer of Emanuel Ungaro due to irreconcilable differences related to the creative direction of the brand.

Following her departure from Ungaro, Archs went on to create costumes for the premiere of Aimanter performed by The Royal Ballet. Archs designed the wardrobe for principal dancers Mara Galeazzi and Edward Watson. The costumes marked Archs's debut into the world of dance and she told a writer for Fashion From Spain "this relationship that has now begun with the ballet dancers of London's Royal Ballet enables me to explore the movements of the female body with the space around it which is and has always been so important in my collections." Archs took inspiration from classical ballet for her 2011 Spring/Summer collection.
