= Biscayne Lady =

Catamaran passenger vessel based in Miami, Florida

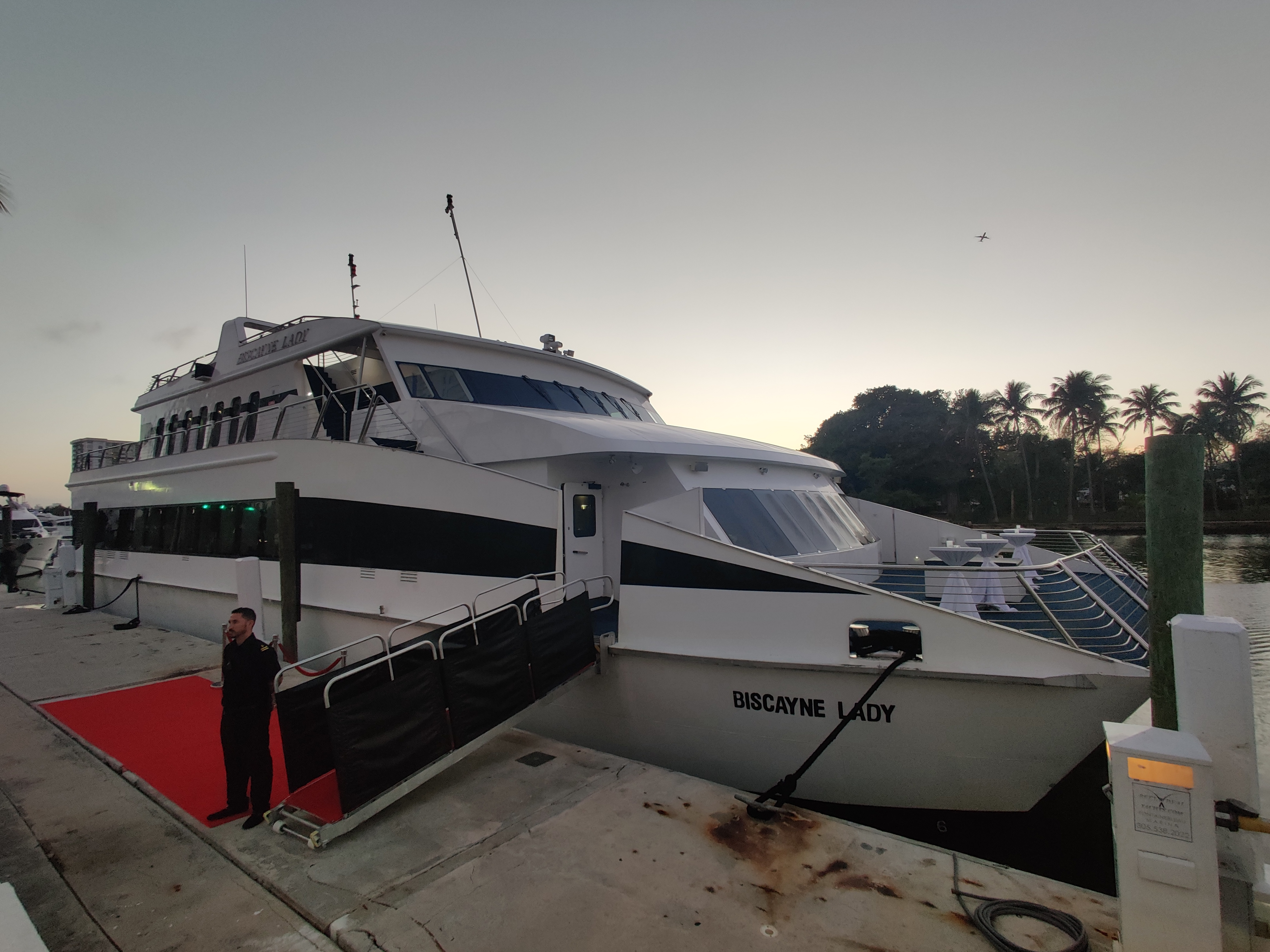
- Biscayne Lady at Miami Beach

History
- Name: Biscayne Lady
- Operator: Biscayne Lady Cruises Inc
- Port of registry: Miami, Florida, US
- Builder: Austal USA
- Cost: $5,000,000
- Launched: January 2003
- Identification: MMSI number: 366872810; Callsign: WDB2148

General characteristics
- Tonnage: 568 GT ITC or 92 GRT
- Length: 103 ft (31 m)
- Beam: 44.3 ft (13.5 m)
- Draft: 5 ft (1.5 m)
- Decks: 3
- Propulsion: Diesel Reduction

Biscayne Lady is a double-hull catamaran passenger vessel registered in Miami, Florida. The boat was built by Austal USA shipbuilders in 2002. Home-docked at Bayside Marina, Biscayne Lady is a venue for private event charters. The yacht operates from most major marinas in South Florida.

Biscayne Lady Yacht Charters consists of Biscayne Lady and one sister ship named Venetian Lady. The company is a subsidiary of Island Queen Cruises & Tours which owns and operates several smaller sightseeing vessels, also home-docked within Bayside Marina.

In October 2018, Miami-Dade police conducted a full-scale active shooter drill onboard Biscayne Lady.
