= Mescinia parvula =

Scientific classification
- Kingdom: Animalia
- Phylum: Arthropoda
- Clade: Pancrustacea
- Class: Insecta
- Order: Lepidoptera
- Family: Pyralidae
- Genus: Mescinia
- Species: M. parvula

Binomial name
- Mescinia parvula (Zeller, 1881)

Synonyms
- Ephestia parvula Zeller, 1881; Mescinia neoparvula Neunzig & Dow, 1993

Species of moth

Mescinia parvula is a species of snout moth in the genus Mescinia. It was described by Zeller in 1881, and is known from Belize (including the Mountain Pine Ridge) and Colombia (including Honda, Tolima).
