= Philippe Krootchey =

- Born: Philippe Georges Robert Crutchet; 23 October 1954; Issy-les-Moulineaux, France
- Died: 9 February 2004 (aged 49) Villejuif, France
- Genres: Electro; disco; funk
- Occupations: Singer; disc jockey; broadcast personality
- Labels: Casablanca; New Deal

Philippe Georges Robert Crutchet (23 October 1954 – 9 February 2004), known professionally as Philippe Krootchey, was a French DJ, musician, and television/radio personality.

== Biography ==
Born of mixed race in Issy-les-Moulineaux to a Beninese father, Krootchey began his career as a disc jockey in the club scene of 1970s Paris, prominently hosting at Les Bains Douches and Le Palace. He was a member of short-lived disco group Love International alongside Philippe Chany and Fred Versailles, who would release one single, "Dance On The Groove (And Do The Funk)", in 1981. After disbanding, Versailles would remain a frequent collaborator of Krootchey.

As a solo recording artist, Krootchey released his first single, "Qu'est-ce qu'il a (d'plus que moi ce négro là?)", followed by its English counterpart "Whatazzy", on Casablanca Records in 1984. Keeping with the track's mockery of racism, its cover art, a high-contrast headshot of Krootchey by Pierre et Gilles, parodies the packaging of French chocolate drink Banania, which featured a smiling, dark-skinned Tirailleur sporting a fez. The accompanying music video for Whatazzy was directed by Jean-Baptiste Mondino.

Krootchey served as the first DJ of the Starck Club in Dallas, Texas upon its May 1984 opening, despite not being able to attend opening night due to construction delays. This residency was brief, as he would make a special re-appearance at the club's second anniversary celebrations in 1986.

His final single on Casablanca, "J'Entends A Mes Oreilles", was released in 1986; with his next and final release "Cruel Justicier" being issued on French eclectic label New Deal in 1989.

In the late 1980s, Krootchey maintained a working relationship with haute couture designer Jean Paul Gaultier, with whom he would share new club and house music from London for use in Gaultier's fashion shows.

He would go on to host Blah-blah Groove for music television channel MCM and L'agence des voyages sonores for Radio Nova for a time in the 1990s. He would later serve a four-year stint as creative director for the LGBT periodical Têtu until the early 2000s.

=== Illness and death ===
Following a legal battle against then-Minister of Health Philippe Douste-Blazy, Krootchey would finally obtain permission to receive a liver transplant from his partner, Pascal. Despite the successful operation, he would later die in Villejuif of a ruptured aneurysm on February 9, 2004, aged forty-nine.

== Discography ==
=== Love International ===
- Dance On The Groove (And Do The Funk) (1981)

=== Krootchey ===
- Qu'est-ce qu'il a (d'plus que moi ce négro là?) (1984)
- Whatazzy (1984)
- J'entends À Mes Oreilles (1986)
- Cruel justicier, (New Deal 1988)
