= Estrella Flyover =

Ramp in the Philippines

- EDSA–Estrella Ramp; Rockwell Flyover
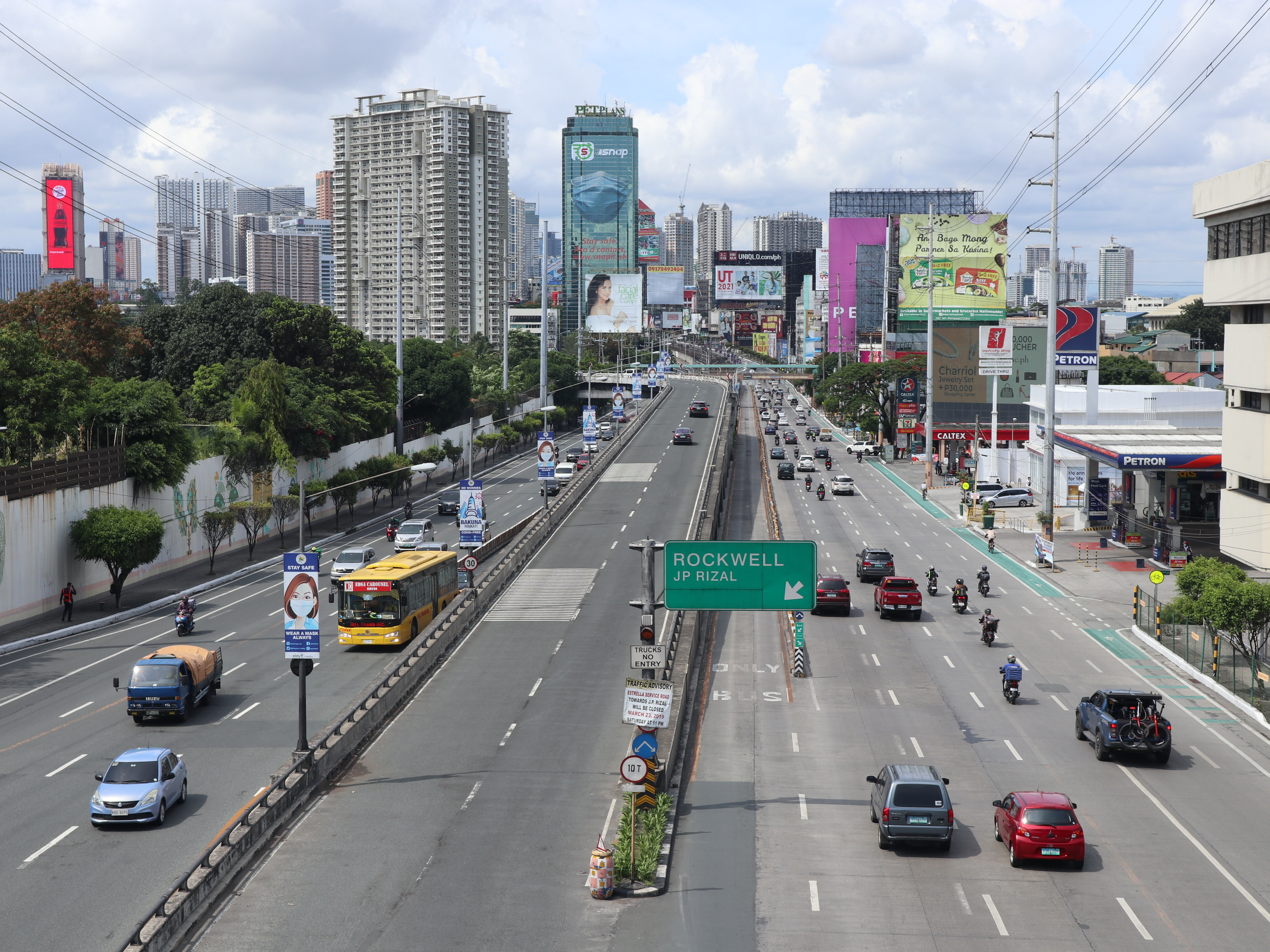
- Estrella Flyover's (center) southern end at EDSA

Location
- Makati, Metro Manila, Philippines
- Coordinates: 14°33′35.2″N 121°2′25.8″E
- Roads at junction: AH 26 (N1) (EDSA); Estrella Street

Construction
- Type: Two-level flyover
- Constructed: 1998 by William Uy Construction Corporation and AD-UP Builders, Inc. (J.V.)
- Opened: April 23, 2002
- Maintained by: Department of Public Works and Highways; Rockwell Land Corporation

The Estrella Flyover, also known as the EDSA–Estrella Ramp and the Rockwell Flyover, is a two-lane flyover connecting Epifanio de los Santos Avenue (EDSA) and Estrella Street in Makati, Metro Manila, Philippines. It facilitates access to the Rockwell Center mixed-use development. It runs along the barangay boundary of Bel-Air with Pinagkaisahan and Guadalupe Viejo.

Built by Rockwell Land Corporation, the developer of Rockwell Center, construction of the flyover began in 1998, originally to facilitate direct northbound traffic flows to Rockwell Center from the Makati Central Business District and the Bonifacio Global City in Taguig via EDSA. Initial plans for managing traffic around the area with the flyover's construction were devised by local construction consultancy SMDI Consultants. The flyover was originally designed by Katahira & Engineers Asia, considering the limited land area for building it partially due to the construction of the Manila Metro Rail Transit System (MRT). Final plans for the flyover, however, were completed by Ove Arup & Partners, DCCD Engineering Corporation and CJG & Associates.

On April 23, 2002, Rockwell Land opened the 620-meter-long (2,030 ft), ₱210 million flyover to traffic, with the inauguration led by Oscar Lopez, chair of the Lopez Group of Companies (the parent company of Rockwell Land), and attended by officials of both companies. Although Department of Public Works and Highways (DPWH) Secretary Simeon Datumanong, Metropolitan Manila Development Authority (MMDA) Chairman Benjamin Abalos Sr., and Makati Mayor Jejomar Binay were invited to attend the inauguration, they were instead represented at the event by DPWH Undersecretary Manuel Bonoan, MMDA General Manager Jaime Paz, and Makati Vice Mayor Ernesto Mercado, respectively.

The Estrella Flyover was originally one-way, but on December 21, 2012, the MMDA opened the flyover to two-way traffic from 7:00 to 10:00 am to ease traffic congestion due to cars turning right onto EDSA from Estrella Street. Done in coordination with Rockwell Land, the move to two-way traffic was initiated partly because of increased traffic flows to the area due to the opening of the Estrella–Pantaleon Bridge in 2011. However, on September 5, 2016, the MMDA reverted the flyover to one-way traffic.
