= Estrella River (Costa Rica) =

River in Costa Rica

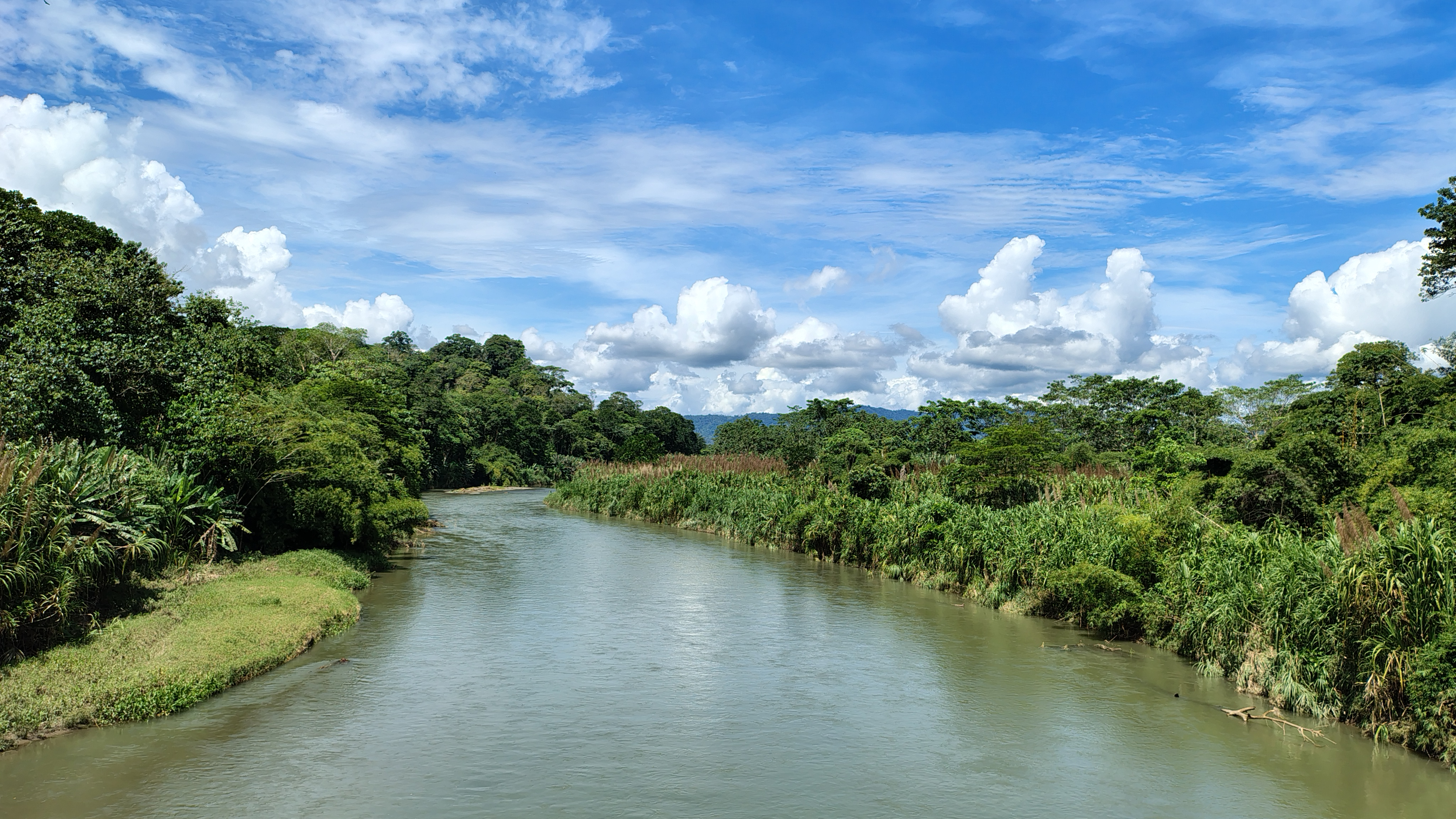
Estrella River (Costa Rica) in 2025

Estrella River is a river of Costa Rica. It flows out of the Cordillera de Talamanca and drains into the Caribbean Sea at Bonifacio about halfway between Limón and Cahuita National Park.
