= Estrella Falls =

Regional shopping mall complex in Arizona, U.S.

Estrella Falls is a planned regional shopping mall and mixed-use complex in Goodyear, Arizona, about 20 miles west of downtown Phoenix. Two segments of the planned development, first proposed in 2005, have opened: a retail power centre called The Market at Estrella Falls, and a multiplex theater, Harkins Estrella Falls 16. Other parts of the site have been replanned and construction of the Goodyear Civic Square at Estrella Falls, to include a new civic center for the city, is expected to begin in 2021.

== Original proposal ==
Estrella Falls was first proposed to the city of Goodyear in 2005 by Westcor, a subsidiary of Macerich specializing in shopping malls, and the development agreement was signed the following year. Original plans were for a mixed-use development on a site north of McDowell Road between Bullard Avenue and Pebble Creek Parkway, consisting of two parts: The Market at Estrella Falls shopping center, to open in 2008, and a regional center including residential, hotel, and office space in addition to an open-air mall covering as much as 950,000 square feet, to open in fall 2009. In addition to Harkins Theatres, the mall had commitments from Dillard's and Macy's department stores; the development agreement with Goodyear required it to be completed by the end of 2012.

The recession of the late 2000s caused ground-breaking for the mall to be deferred, and its projected opening was delayed several times: in early 2008, until fall 2010; in early 2009, until 2011; and finally in late 2009, until 2016, with the city agreeing to extend the development deadline to the end of that year and Westcor also securing an extension on another planned mall in Surprise, Prasada.

=== The Market at Estrella Falls ===
The Market at Estrella Falls, the first planned segment of the development, on 40 acres, opened in 2008. Robert L. Stark's Stark Enterprises bought it from Macerich in 2018.

=== Harkins Estrella Falls 16 ===
Harkins Theatres opened Harkins Estrella Falls 16, originally projected to be part of the mall, in October 2016.

== Goodyear Civic Square at Estrella Falls ==
In 2019, the city approved a new public-private partnership development agreement with Globe Corporation to build a civic center, including a library and new city hall, together with office space, a parking garage, housing, and a 2-acre park on the Estrella Falls site, with the first of two phases located between The Market at Estrella Falls and Harkins Estrella Falls 16 and expected to begin construction in 2021 and open in 2022. The project is to replace a temporary city hall; the city first bought land for a new civic center in 1984 and in the 21st century has also sought to develop a downtown on another site.
