= Manuel Bonnet =

French author and an award-winning actor

- Citizenship: French
- Education: Conservatoire national supérieur d'art dramatique
- Known for: Highlander: The Series, novels
- Scientific career
- Fields: Actor

Manuel Bonnet is a French author and an award-winning actor who primarily appears in French cinema and television.

== Career ==
He studied at the Conservatoire national supérieur d'art dramatique in Paris from 1970–73 and has had many roles and cameo parts in film and TV over more than 30 years, mostly in France.

Bonnet made a guest appearance on Highlander: The Series as Cavalry Captain in an episode titled Unholy Alliance: Part 2 and also the French foreign subtitled film Les Fautes d'orthographe. He also appeared in Thomas the Falconer alongside actors and actresses like Brano Holicek, Juraj Kukura, Jiri Langmajer and Jaroslav Zvasta.

A direct descendant of the photographic pioneer Nicéphore Niépce, Manuel Bonnet was the co-writer, with Jean-Louis Marignier of the book “Niépce, correspondance et papiers”, published by Maison Nicéphore Niépce in 2003, and the initiator of the celebrations in 2007 of the bicentennial of the invention of the Pyreolophore, an early internal combustion engine designed by the Niépce brothers.

In the course of research made by the Swedish filmmaker Vilgot Sjöman on Alfred Nobel, the study by Manuel Bonnet of Nobel's French associate, Paul Barbe, found recognition through the creation of files bearing his name in the archives of the Nobel institute in Stockholm.

He has also contributed to the book by Max Lavigne entitled : "Chantecoq, De la Cité Royale à la Commune républicaine" in 1996.

== Appearances ==
=== Theatre ===
- Dix Petits Negres. Directed By Jacqueline Bœuf
- Le Temps des Gitans. Directed By Emir Kusturica (Opéra De Paris)
- Amadeus. Directed by Stéphane Hillel
- Entrez sans Frapper. Directed By Raymond Acquaviva
- La Boutique au Coin De La Rue. Directed By Jean-Jacques Zilbermann
- Grison Iv. Directed By G. Savoisien
- Cinema Parlant. Directed By Daniel Colas
- Drôle de Gouter. Directed By Gérard Maro
- Romeo et Juliette. Directed By Jean-Paul Lucet
- Britannicus. Directed By Simone Beaudoin
- Andromaque. Directed By Pierre Santini
- Les Temps Difficiles. Directed By Pierre Dux
- Lenine. Directed By Claude Vermorel
- Les Fourberies de Scapin. Directed by Pierre Boutron
- Trio Pour Deux Canaris. Directed by François Duval
- La Comedie Humaine. Directed By Paul-Emile Deiber
- L'aiglon. Directed By Jean-Laurent Cochet

=== Television ===
- L’école Du Pouvoir. Director - Raoul Peck
- Memento. Director - Patrick Poubel
- Les Intouchables. Director - Benoît D’aubert
- La Vie Devant Nous, Cinq Ans Apres. Director - Laura Muscardin
- Vrai Comme Un Reve. Director - Christophe Otzenberger
- Les Enfants D'orion. Director - Philippe Venault
- Voici Venir L'orage. Director - Nina Companeez
- Securite Interieure. Director - Patrick Grandperret
- Max Jacob. Director - Gabriel Aghion
- Ris - Police Scientifique (Dépendances). Director - Klaus Biderman
- La Vallee. Director - Raoul Peck
- Commissaire Valence. Director - Denis Amar
- Plus Belle La Vie. Director - Jean-Pierre Igoux.
- Le Proces De Bobigny. Director - François Luciani.
- Denonciation Calomnieuse. Director - Dominique Ladoge
- Jusqu’au Bout. Director - Maurice Failevic
- Les Bourreaux De L'ombre (Navarro). Director - Jean Sagols
- Biarritz. Director - Olivier Guignard
- Les Perles Du Pacifique. Director - G. Bannier / T. Guerrier / Didier Delaitre
- Les Filles De Vincennes. Director - Thierry Binisti
- Ciel D’orage. Director - Paolo Barzman
- Factures Sociales (Les Bœufs Carottes). Director - Gérard Cuq
- La Nouvelle Tribu. Director - Roger Vadim
- Mon Pere Avait Raison. Director - Roger Vadim
- Flairs Ennemis. Director - Robin Davis
- Les Alsaciens. Director - Michel Favart
- Tabou. Director - Alain Robak
- Cas De Divorce. Director - G. Espinasse / A. Lombardi
- Tango. Director - Jacques Payette
- Chasseurs De Loups. Director - Didier Albert
- Highlander: The Series - Unholy Alliance 2. Director - P. Ellis
- Christmas Carol (1984) – Director – Francis Junek
- Seconde B. Director - Christiane Spiero
- La Devoyee. Director - Jacques Audoir
- Repetition D’un Meurtre. Director - Jacques Audoir
- Pas De Noel Pour Sarah-Lou. Director - Geneviève Strina
- L'or Et Le Papier. Director - Nino Monti
- La Patrie En Danger. Director - J.D. De La Rochefoucauld
- La Vie En Couleur. Director - J. Doniol Valcroze
- La Danse De Salome. Director - Jacques Ordines
- L'ete De La Revolution. Director - Lazare Iglesis
- L'affaire Saint Romans. Director - Michel Wyn
- Arrets Frequents. Director - Gérard Marx
- Celine. Director - Josée Dayan
- Les Pardaillan. Director - Josée Dayan
- Madame Et Ses Flics. Director - R. Bernard
- Le Vent Du Large. Director - M. Bertin
- Le Chant De Noel. Director - Pierre Boutron
- Laure Et Adriani. Director - Gérard Espinasse
- La Prison Sur La Mer. Director - Jacques Ordines
- Pour Le Plaisir. Director - Pascal Goethals
- Les Dames A La Licorne. Director - Lazare Iglesis
- Je Tue Il. Director - Pierre Boutron
- Le Danseur Mondain. Director - Gérard Espinasse
- Crapotte. Director - Agnès Delarive
- Le Nœud De Viperes. Director - Jacques Trebouta
- Louis Xi. Director - Alexandre Astruc
- Lazare Carnot. Director - Jean-François Delassus
- Auteurs De Folie. Director - Claude Fayard
- Les Années D'illusion. Director - Pierre Matteuzi
- Chroniques Martiennes. Director - Kammerscheit
- L'âge En Fleur. Director - Philippe Agostini

=== Cinema ===
- 15 Ans Et Demi. Director - François Desagnat & Thomas Sorriaux
- Ça Se Soigne ? Director - Laurent Chouchan
- Alfred. Director – Vilgot Sjöman.
- Le Dernier Gang. Director - Ariel Zeitoun
- Perds Pas La Boule. Director - Maria Pia Crapanzano
- Mort A L'ecran. Director - Alexis Ferrebeuf
- Les Fautes D'orthographe. Director - Jean-Jacques Zilbermann
- Rue Des Plaisirs. Director - Patrice Leconte
- Sokoliar Tomas. Director - Vaclav Vorlicek
- L'affaire. Director - Sergio Gobbi
- In The Shadow Of The Sandcastles. Director - Philippe Blot
- Funny Boy. Director - Christian Le Hemonet
- Sibylle. Director - Robert Cappa
