= La Estrella, Spain =

La Estrella
- Municipality
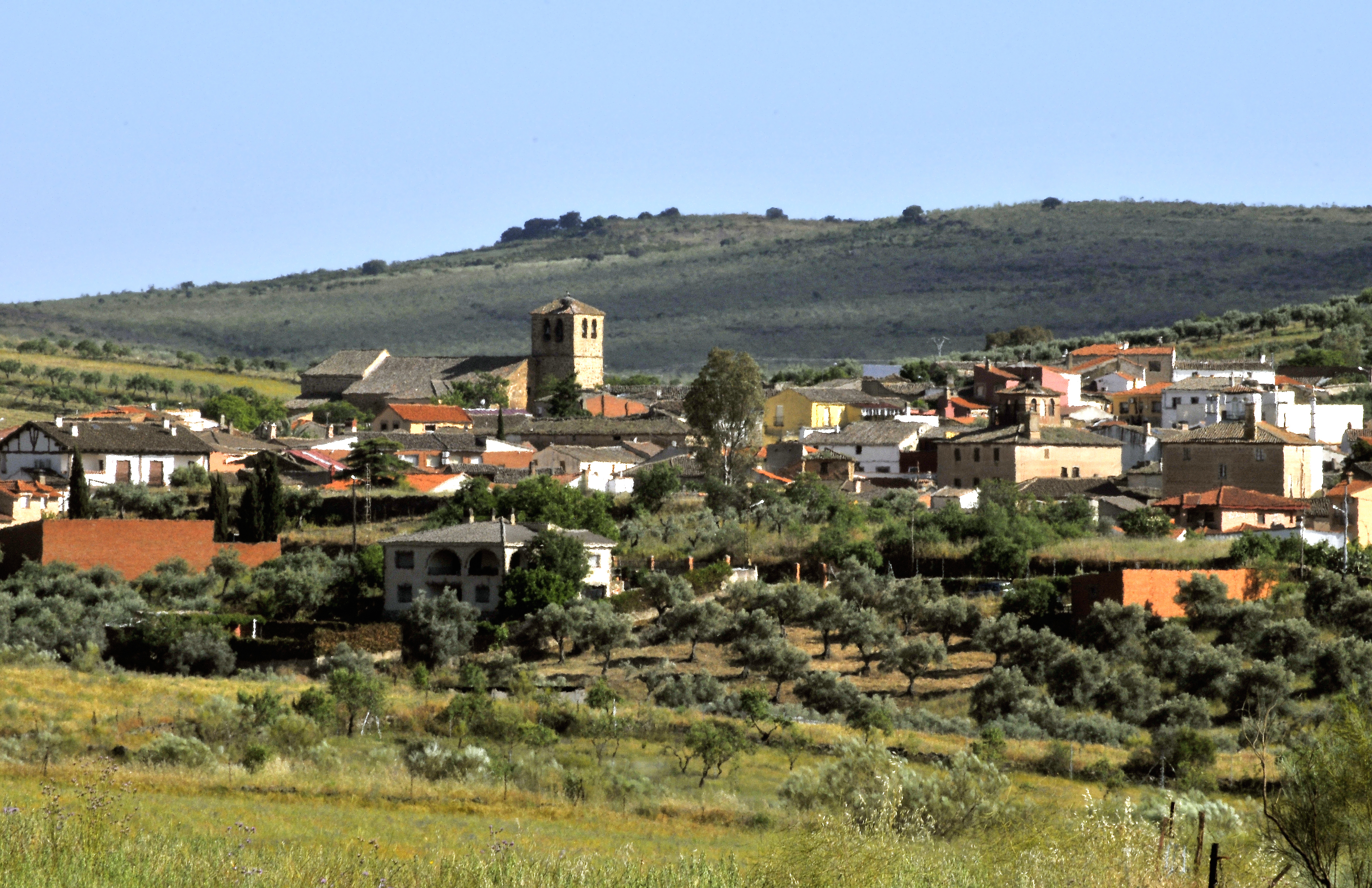

- Coat of arms

- Location within Castilla-La Mancha Location within Spain
- Coordinates: 39°41′13″N 5°5′34″W
- Country: Spain
- Autonomous community: Castilla–La Mancha
- Province: Toledo

Area
  - Total: 77.23 km^{2} (29.82 sq mi)

Population (2025-01-01)
  - Total: 251
  - Density: 3.25/km^{2} (8.42/sq mi)
- Time zone: UTC+1 (CET)
  - Summer (DST): UTC+2 (CEST)

La Estrella, also known as La Estrella de La Jara, is a municipality of Spain located in the province of Toledo, autonomous community of Castilla–La Mancha. The municipality spans across a total area of 77.23 km^{2} and, as of 1 January 2023, it has a registered population of 298.

The place was formerly referred as "El Estrella".

In addition to the main settlement of the same name, the municipality of La Estrella also includes another settlement (pedanía), Fuentes.
