= Mescinia estrella =

Scientific classification
- Domain: Eukaryota
- Kingdom: Animalia
- Phylum: Arthropoda
- Class: Insecta
- Order: Lepidoptera
- Family: Pyralidae
- Genus: Mescinia
- Species: M. estrella

Binomial name
- Mescinia estrella Barnes & McDunnough, 1913

Species of moth

Mescinia estrella is a species of snout moth in the genus Mescinia. It was described by William Barnes and James Halliday McDunnough in 1913, and is known from the Everglades in Florida, United States.
