= Esteban Cortázar =

Colombian-American fashion designer

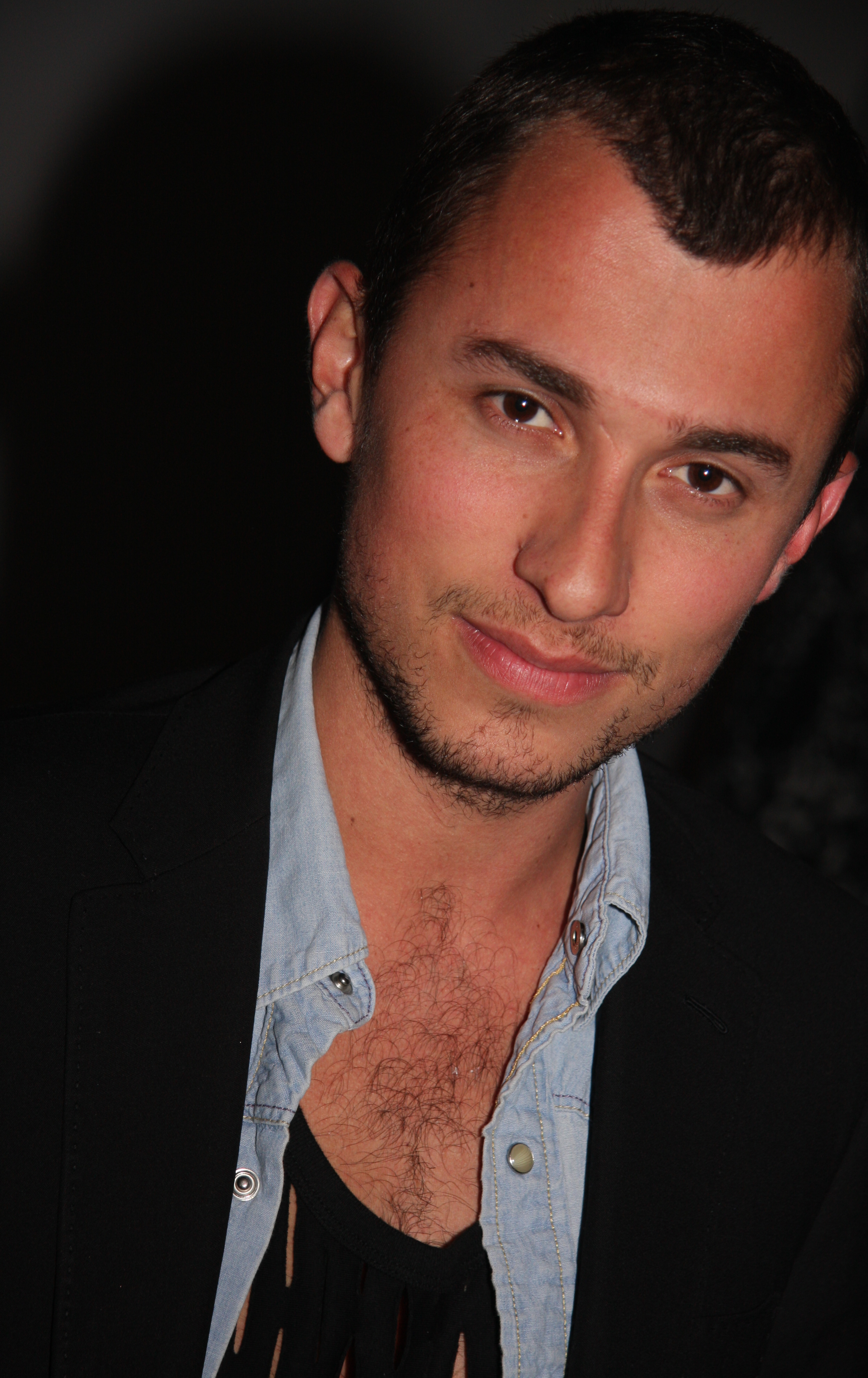
- Cortázar in June 2009
- Born: 17 May 1984 (age 42); Bogotá, Colombia
- Other name: Esteban Cortazar
- Occupation: Fashion designer

Esteban Cortázar (born May 17, 1984) is a Colombian-American fashion designer. He grew up in Miami, Florida, and is one of the youngest designers to ever present at New York Fashion Week.

== Early life ==
Cortázar was born on May 17, 1984, in Bogotá, Colombia, to Colombian painter Valentino Cortázar and British former jazz singer Dominique Vaughan.

His influence includes his own childhood which straddled continents, lifestyles, and subcultures. Cortázar stated that his work is an homage to his Colombian heritage. This is evident in the way he integrates Colombian symbols and iconography, such as the country's flag and emblems, into his designs. In interviews, he constantly references Colombia and its overseas communities, such as the one in Miami, Florida. At age 13, Esteban showed his fashion sketches to Todd Oldham, who became his mentor.

In 2004, Cortázar graduated from Miami's Design and Architecture High School, where he studied fashion design.

=== Miami Influence ===
South Beach during the 1990s, was Esteban's childhood playground. It featured an evolving fashion scene pioneered by designers Gianni Versace and Todd Oldham. The city's Latin cultural scene and kitsch trans-culture became the backdrop for iconic imagery, such as those by Bruce Weber, Peter Lindberg and Herb Ritz. Their collective vision of empowered, nonchalant supermodels stayed in Cortázar's mind as he came to view fashion as self-expression.

In 1999, Esteban's early sketches caught the eye of Kal Ruttenstein, Bloomingdale's late fashion director. He later picked up Esteban's first collection. Other international retailers followed suit, and in 2006 Esteban became a member of the Council of Fashion Designers of America.

From 2004 to 2008, he partnered up with Edit Meurrens as his business partner; she managed all financials for the company and was behind making New York Fashion Week (NYFW) at Bryant Park possible for the house of Cortazar for four years or eight seasons. At that time, Cortazar was the youngest designer to show in NY fashion week, which opened many doors and gave Cortazar more recognition in the fashion world. This made his move and transition to Paris possible.

== Career ==
In 2007, Cortázar moved to Paris to lead the House of Emanuel Ungaro. He familiarised himself with one of Europe's fashion icons. He has resided in Paris ever since.

In 2012, Natalie Massanet approached Cortázar to create a series of capsule collections for Net-a-Porter. This process ushered in the relaunch of his eponymous brand. His work earned international acclaim and a loyal following for his personal take on femininity, modernity, and luxury.

In 2014, Cortázar created a strategy to lessen the interval from runway to store without compromising craftsmanship. His approach was to confirm orders and begin production before his runway shows cutting the gap. The strategy started a conversation that is reshaping the industry.

After showcasing at the Paris Fashion Week, Cortázar's style earned a cult following. That style is defined by slick, sculptural lines created with ease, grace, and flow. His collections often juxtapose two ideas: a body restricted and a body free. Poet shirting, circle hems, sliced leather, and equestrian hardware let women appear assured, bold and austere. He has been referred to by Vogue as "the most uninhibited designer showing in Paris."

In 2024, he introduced ‘Donde Esteban’, specializing in unisex resort wear.

Cortázar's collections are stocked in stores worldwide, including Barneys, Bergdorf Goodman, Lane Crawford, Browns, The Webster, Net-a-Porter and Matches.

== Colette ==
As part of the 2017 France-Colombia Year, Cortázar made a personal selection of Colombian brands and representative products for the Colette concept store. This event lasted two weeks and was the subject of a specific installation of shop windows at Colette. One represented a typical Colombian grocery store, while the second was dedicated to Cortázar's capsule collection.

From July 10–22, 2017, France paid tribute to Colombia through cultural and artistic initiatives. Cortázar joined forces with the Parisian concept store Colette to honour his influences. The program featured: a water bar made in Colombia, which offered a special menu from Colombian chef Carlos Peñarredonda; beautiful books, including the limited edition of Botero d'Assouline which retraces the country's artistic culture; and clothing such as a hoodie imagined by Colombian reggaetón singer J Balvin. A set of collaborative pieces with local artists and designers emphasised Esteban's knowledge of Colombia.

Cortázar used this event to promote his first sportswear collection, produced in Colombia by Seven Seven, comprising unisex pieces such as hoodies, t-shirts, socks, and screen-printed images of Colombian pop culture. A collaboration with Loopzu offered socks inspired by the Barranquilla Carnival and drawings by indigenous Wayuu communities. Accessories such as Mercedes Salazar, Casa Chiqui, Mola Sasa, greenhouses of Magnetic Midnight, and original jewelry by Paula Mendoza. The collection is completed with common crafts from Artesanias de Colombia.

In the shop, he included Colombian gastronomy, crafts, drawings, music, and books, to associate his country with the avant-garde mystique of Colette. It is a project conceptually aligned with Boutique Colette, located in the heart of Paris, in Rue Saint Honoré.

Finally, tote bags featured Valentino Cortazar, t-shirts featured Luis Caballero and Pedro Ruiz, and technicolor chairs highlighted Ramon Laserna. Editors of the event included: Oficina del Doctor of the Casa Reigner Gallery, Kristina McLean, The Silueta, and Toluca.
