= Estrella Jail =

Women-only jail in Phoenix, Arizona

Coordinates: 33.4282°N 112.1237°W

Estrella Jail is a women-only Maricopa County jail facility located in Phoenix, Arizona.

The facility has a capacity of approximately 1,400. It was constructed in 1991.

Estrella Jail received media attention in 2013 during the trial of Jodi Arias. The media were invited to view her cell by sheriff Joe Arpaio following reports the accused murderer was having an easy time while incarcerated.

== Notable inmates ==
Notable prisoners house at the jail include:

- Jodi Arias – convicted of the murder of Travis Alexander
- Lori Vallow-Daybell Guilty - Conspiracy to Commit Murder - Brandon Boudreaux Guilty - Conspiracy to Commit Murder - Charles Vallow (4th Husband)
