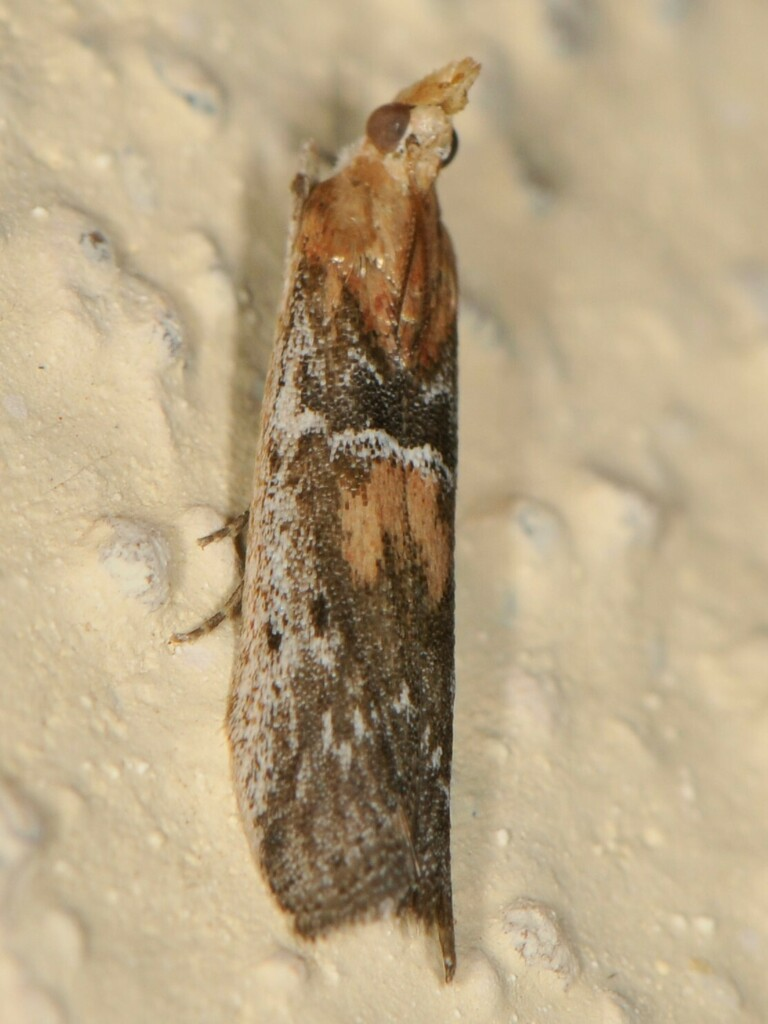

Scientific classification
- Domain: Eukaryota
- Kingdom: Animalia
- Phylum: Arthropoda
- Class: Insecta
- Order: Lepidoptera
- Family: Pyralidae
- Genus: Honora
- Species: H. mellinella

Binomial name
- Honora mellinella Grote, 1878

Synonyms
- Honora ochrimaculella Grote, 1887

= Honora mellinella =

Species of moth

Honora mellinella is a genus of snout moth. It was described by Augustus Radcliffe Grote in 1878. It is found in the south-eastern United States, west through Texas, Arizona, south-eastern California, and eastern Washington. It has also been recorded from Oklahoma.

The length of the forewings is 7–11 mm.

The larvae feed on the flower heads of Palafoxia species, including Palafoxia arida.
