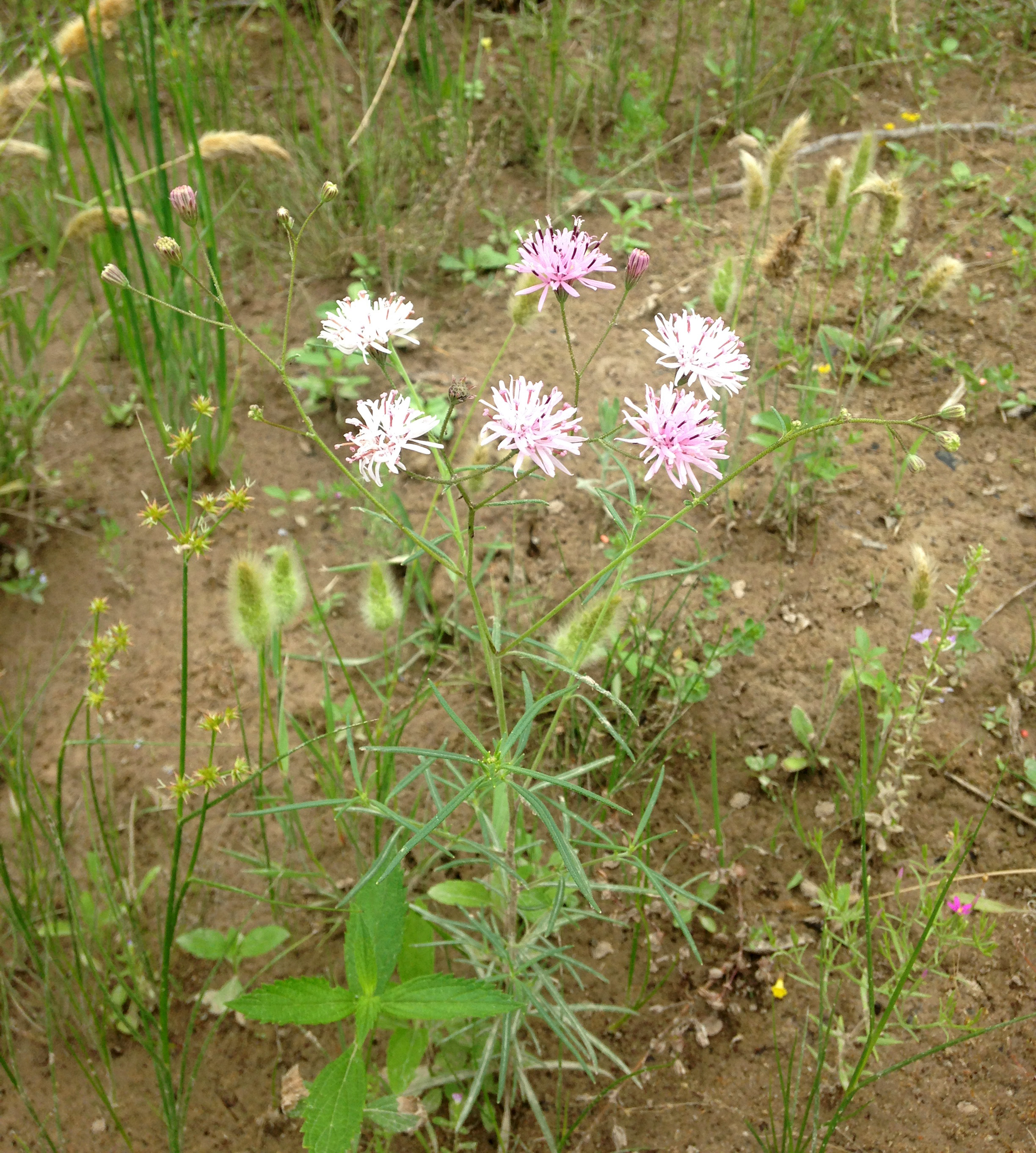

Conservation status
- Apparently Secure (NatureServe)

Scientific classification
- Kingdom: Plantae
- Clade: Tracheophytes
- Clade: Angiosperms
- Clade: Eudicots
- Clade: Asterids
- Order: Asterales
- Family: Asteraceae
- Genus: Palafoxia
- Species: P. callosa

Binomial name
- Palafoxia callosa (Nutt.) Torr. & A. Gray

= Palafoxia callosa =

Species of flowering plant

Palafoxia callosa, commonly known as the small palafox, or spanish needles is a species of flowering plant in the aster family.

It is native to North America, where it is found in the south-central United States and in the state of Coahuila in Mexico. A disjunct population is found in the Blackland Prairie region of Mississippi in the United States. Its natural habitat is rocky, calcareous soil in glades and prairies. It is less commonly found along the banks of streams. It is popular for butterfly gardens.

Palafoxia callosa is an annual. It produces heads of pink to white flowers in late summer and fall. Its narrow leaves are often wilted by flowering time.
