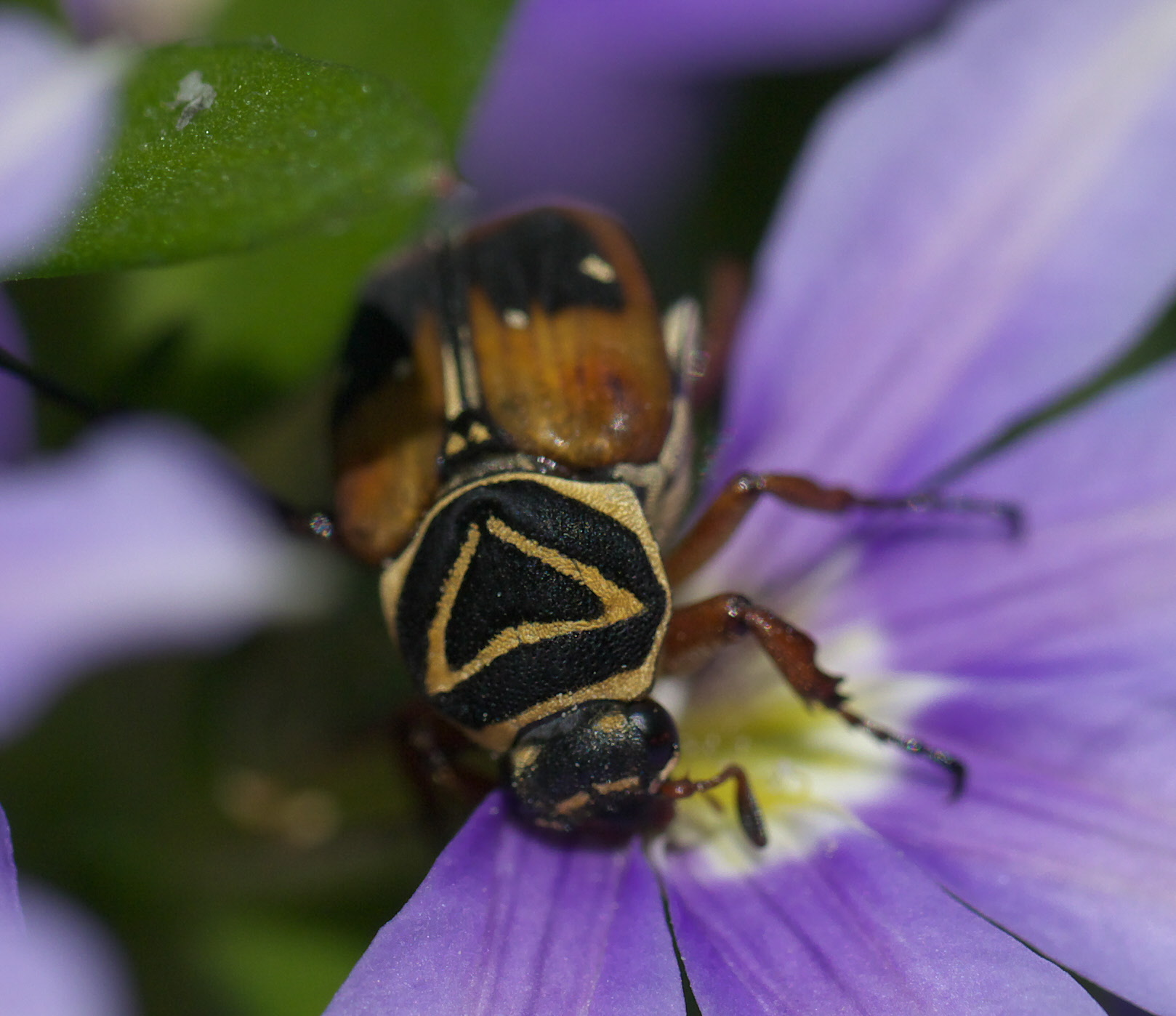
- Trigonopeltastes delta

Scientific classification
- Kingdom: Animalia
- Phylum: Arthropoda
- Clade: Pancrustacea
- Class: Insecta
- Order: Coleoptera
- Suborder: Polyphaga
- Infraorder: Scarabaeiformia
- Family: Scarabaeidae
- Subfamily: Cetoniinae
- Tribe: Trichiini
- Genus: Trigonopeltastes; Burmeister, 1840

Synonyms
- Roplisa Casey, 1909; Archimedius Kirby, 1827; Euclidius Kirby, 1827; Trichius (Archimedius) Kirby, 1827; Trichius (Euclidius) Kirby, 1827

= Trigonopeltastes =

Genus of beetles

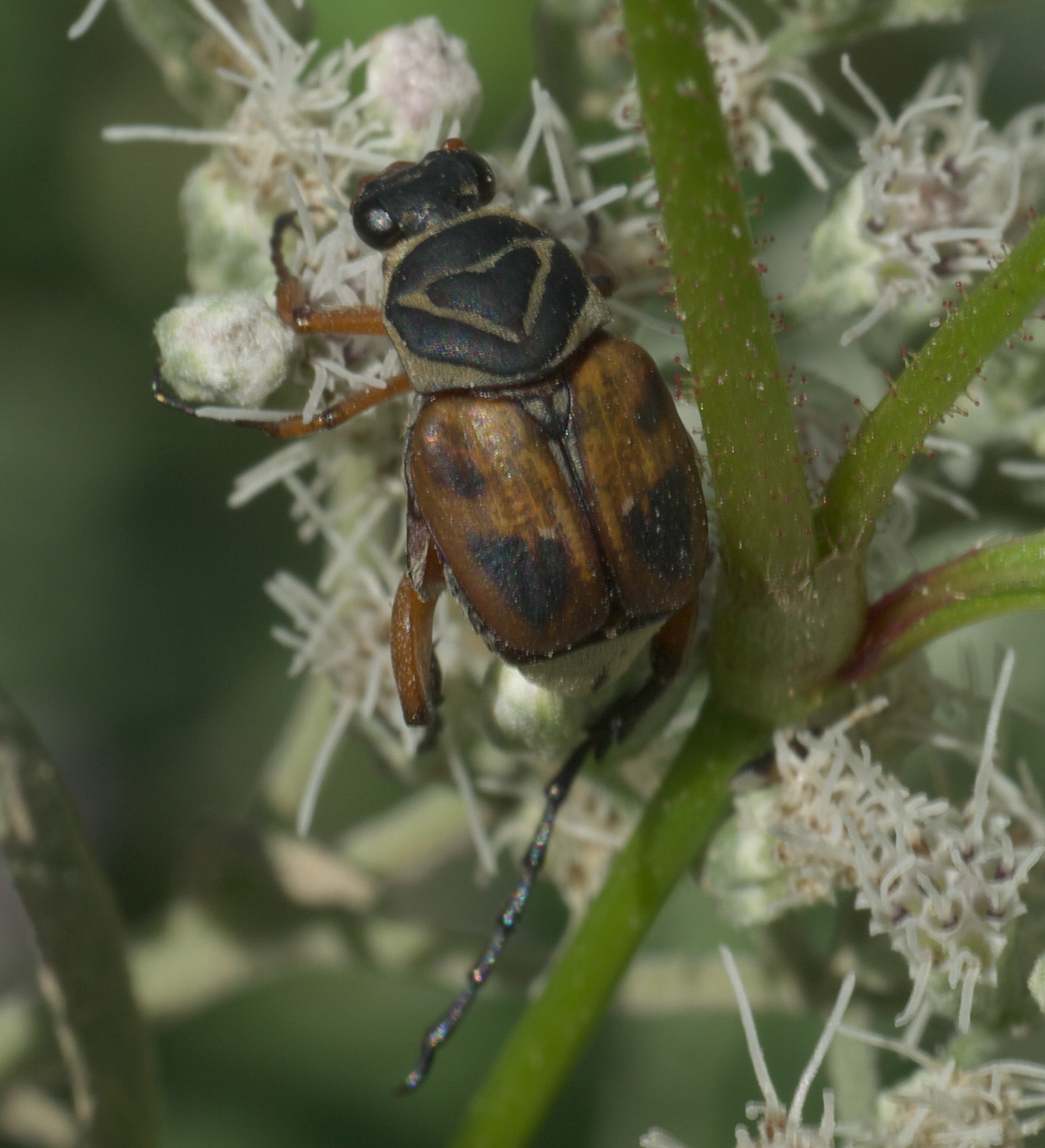
Trigonopeltastes delta

Trigonopeltastes is a genus of fruit and flower chafers in the beetle family Scarabaeidae, found in North and Central America. There are more than 20 described species in Trigonopeltastes.

== Species ==
- Trigonopeltastes arborfloricola Smith, 2016
- Trigonopeltastes archimedes Schaum, 1841
- Trigonopeltastes aurovelutinus Curoe, 2011
- Trigonopeltastes barbatus Howden & Joly, 1998
- Trigonopeltastes delta (Forster, 1771) (delta flower scarab)
- Trigonopeltastes deltoides (Newmann, 1838)
- Trigonopeltastes discrepans Howden, 1968
- Trigonopeltastes femoratus Howden, 1968
- Trigonopeltastes floridanus (Casey, 1909) (scrub palmetto scarab)
- Trigonopeltastes formidulosus Smith, 2016
- Trigonopeltastes frontalis Bates, 1889
- Trigonopeltastes geometricus Schaum, 1841
- Trigonopeltastes glabellus Howden, 1988
- Trigonopeltastes henryi Smith, 2016
- Trigonopeltastes intermedius Bates, 1889
- Trigonopeltastes kerleyi Ricchiardi, 2003
- Trigonopeltastes mombachoensis Smith, 2016
- Trigonopeltastes pontilis Howden, 1988
- Trigonopeltastes sallaei Bates, 1889
- Trigonopeltastes simplex Bates, 1889
- Trigonopeltastes thomasi Howden & Ratcliffe, 1990
- Trigonopeltastes triangulus (Kirby, 1818)
- Trigonopeltastes truncatus Howden, 1968
- Trigonopeltastes variabilis Howden, 1968
- Trigonopeltastes wappesi Howden, 1988
- Trigonopeltastes warneri Smith, 2016
