= Palafoxia riograndensis =

Conservation status
- Apparently Secure (NatureServe)

Scientific classification
- Kingdom: Plantae
- Clade: Tracheophytes
- Clade: Angiosperms
- Clade: Eudicots
- Clade: Asterids
- Order: Asterales
- Family: Asteraceae
- Genus: Palafoxia
- Species: P. riograndensis

Binomial name
- Palafoxia riograndensis Cory

Species of flowering plant

Palafoxia riograndensis, the Rio Grande palafox or Rio Grande Spanish needles, is a plant species native to Texas, Chihuahua and Coahuila. It is named for the Rio Grande which separates Texas from Mexico. The plant grows in sandy and silty soils at elevations of 50–200 m (160–660 ft).

Palafoxia riograndensis is an annual herb up to 60 cm (24 in) tall. Flowering heads have no ray flowers but 8-25 pink, purple or white disc flowers.
