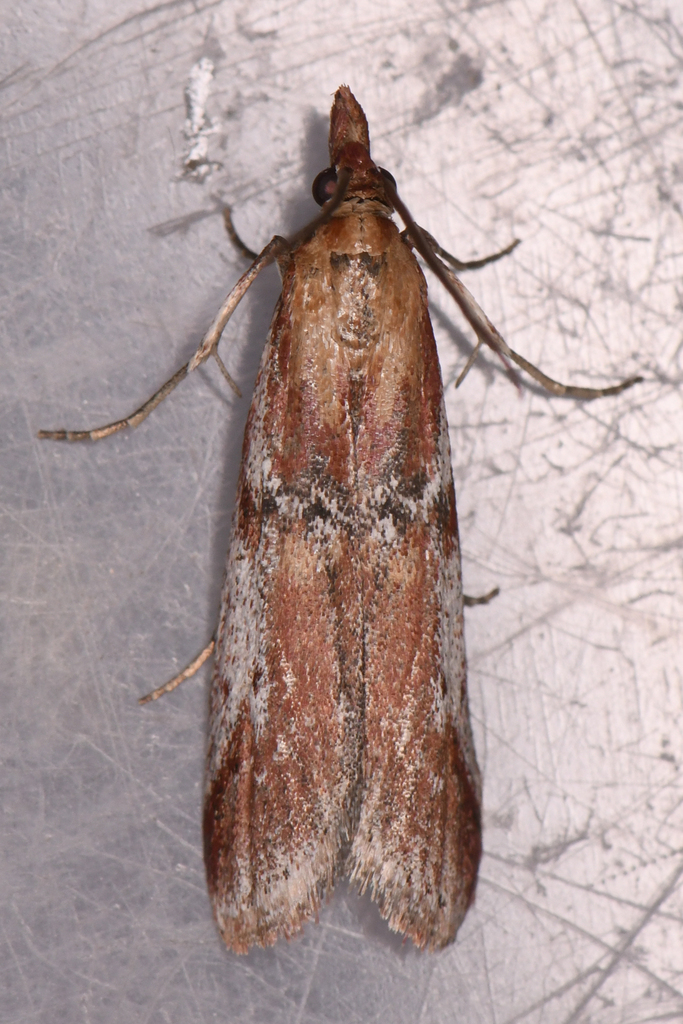

Scientific classification
- Kingdom: Animalia
- Phylum: Arthropoda
- Class: Insecta
- Order: Lepidoptera
- Family: Pyralidae
- Genus: Honora
- Species: H. montinatatella

Binomial name
- Honora montinatatella (Hulst, 1887)

Synonyms
- Spermatophthora montinatatella Hulst, 1887; Honora canicostella Ragonot, 1887

= Honora montinatatella =

Species of moth

Honora montinatatella is a species of snout moth in the genus Honora. It was described by George Duryea Hulst in 1887. It is found in western North America, including Arizona, California and Washington.

The wingspan is about 23 mm.
