= Honora perdubiella =

Scientific classification
- Domain: Eukaryota
- Kingdom: Animalia
- Phylum: Arthropoda
- Class: Insecta
- Order: Lepidoptera
- Family: Pyralidae
- Genus: Honora
- Species: H. perdubiella

Binomial name
- Honora perdubiella (Dyar, 1905)

Synonyms
- Zophodia perdubiella Dyar, 1905; Eumysia perdubiella Dyar, 1925

Species of moth

Honora perdubiella is a species of snout moth in the genus Honora. It was described by Harrison Gray Dyar Jr. in 1905. It is found in North America, including Utah, and British Columbia.
