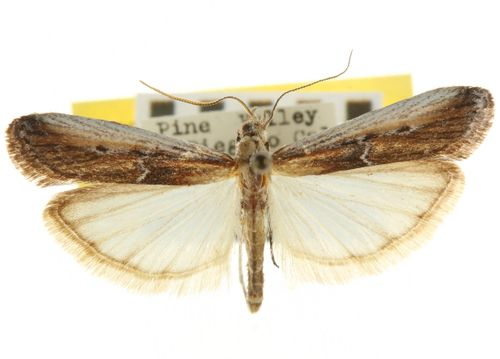

Scientific classification
- Kingdom: Animalia
- Phylum: Arthropoda
- Class: Insecta
- Order: Lepidoptera
- Family: Pyralidae
- Genus: Honora
- Species: H. dotella

Binomial name
- Honora dotella Dyar, 1910

= Honora dotella =

Species of moth

Honora dotella is a species of snout moth in the genus Honora. It was described by Harrison Gray Dyar Jr. in 1910. It is found in the US along the coastal mountains of California, from Monterey County southward.

The length of the forewings is 8.5-12.5 mm.
