= Honora (moth) =

Scientific classification
- Domain: Eukaryota
- Kingdom: Animalia
- Phylum: Arthropoda
- Class: Insecta
- Order: Lepidoptera
- Family: Pyralidae
- Subfamily: Phycitinae
- Genus: Honora; Grote, 1878

Genus of moths

Honora is a genus of snout moths described by Augustus Radcliffe Grote in 1878.

== Species ==
- Honora dotella Dyar, 1910
- Honora mellinella Grote, 1878
- Honora montinatatella (Hulst, 1887)
- Honora perdubiella (Dyar, 1905)
- Honora sciurella Ragonot, 1887
- Honora subsciurella Ragonot, 1887
