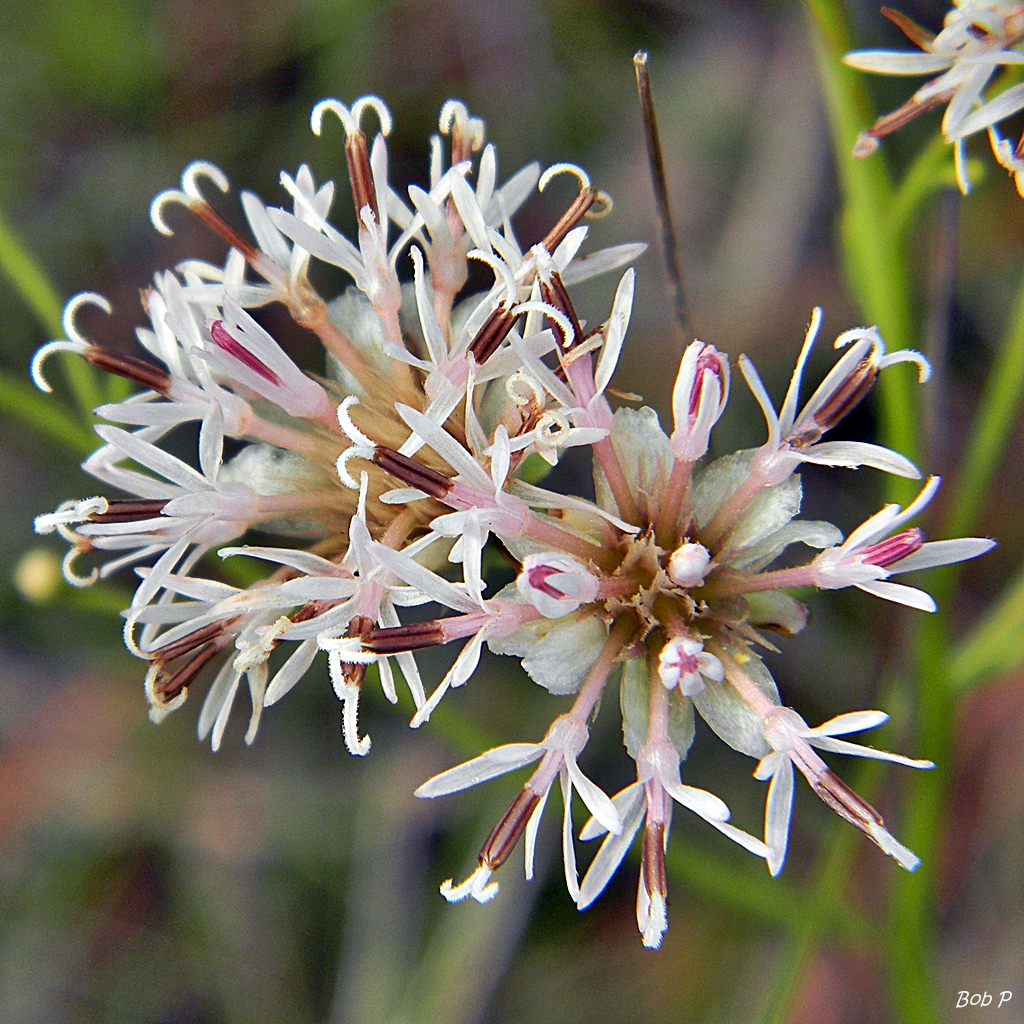

Conservation status
- Vulnerable (NatureServe)

Scientific classification
- Kingdom: Plantae
- Clade: Tracheophytes
- Clade: Angiosperms
- Clade: Eudicots
- Clade: Asterids
- Order: Asterales
- Family: Asteraceae
- Genus: Palafoxia
- Species: P. integrifolia

Binomial name
- Palafoxia integrifolia (Nutt.) Torr. & A. Gray

= Palafoxia integrifolia =

Species of flowering plant

Palafoxia integrifolia, commonly known as the coastalplain palafox and coastal plain palafox, is a species of palafox native to the southeastern United States.

== Description ==
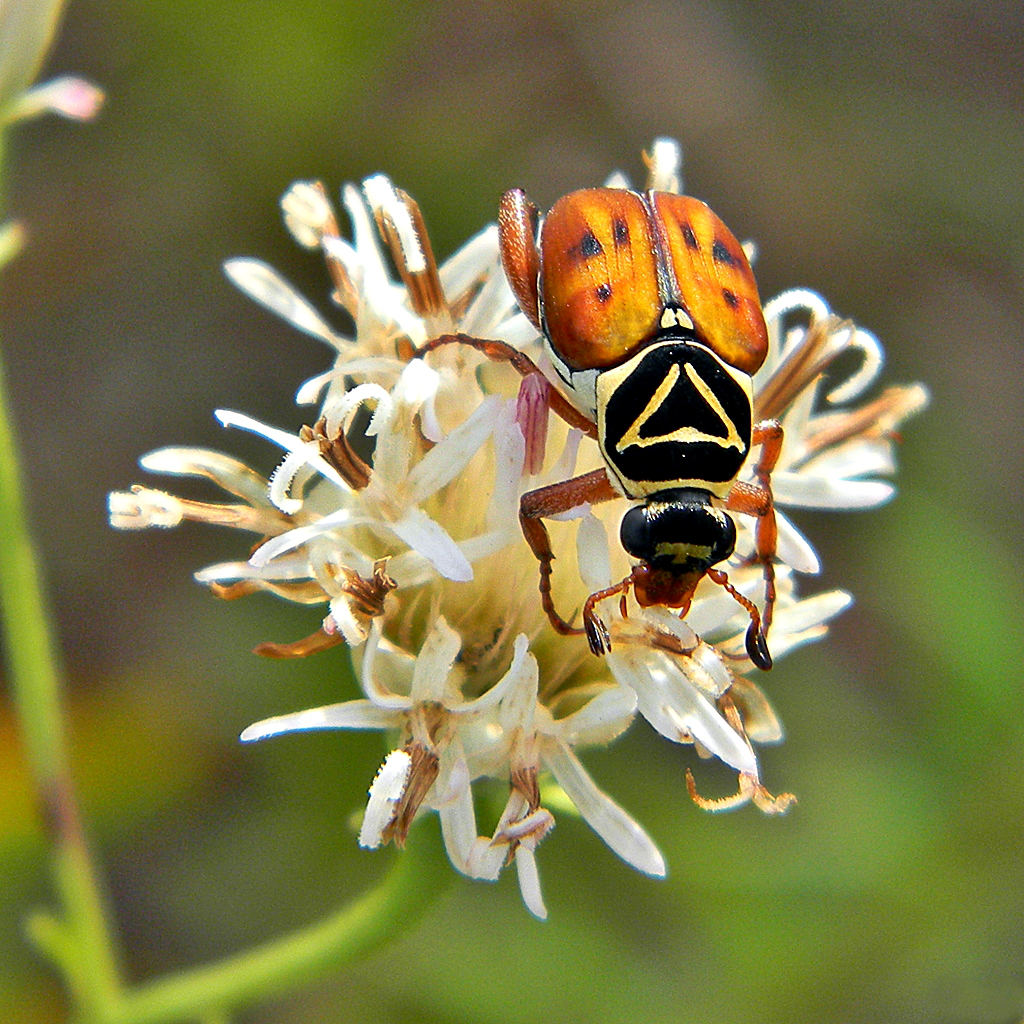
Palafoxia integrifolia is pollinated by insects such as the delta flower scarab.

Palafoxia integrifolia is a herbaceous annual plant with pinkish-white disc flowers arranged in inflorescences. It has glossy, alternating leaves which elongate on the lower portion of the stems and more linear at the top. The stems of P. integrifolia are less woody than other species of palafox, making it prone to drooping.

== Taxonomy and etymology ==
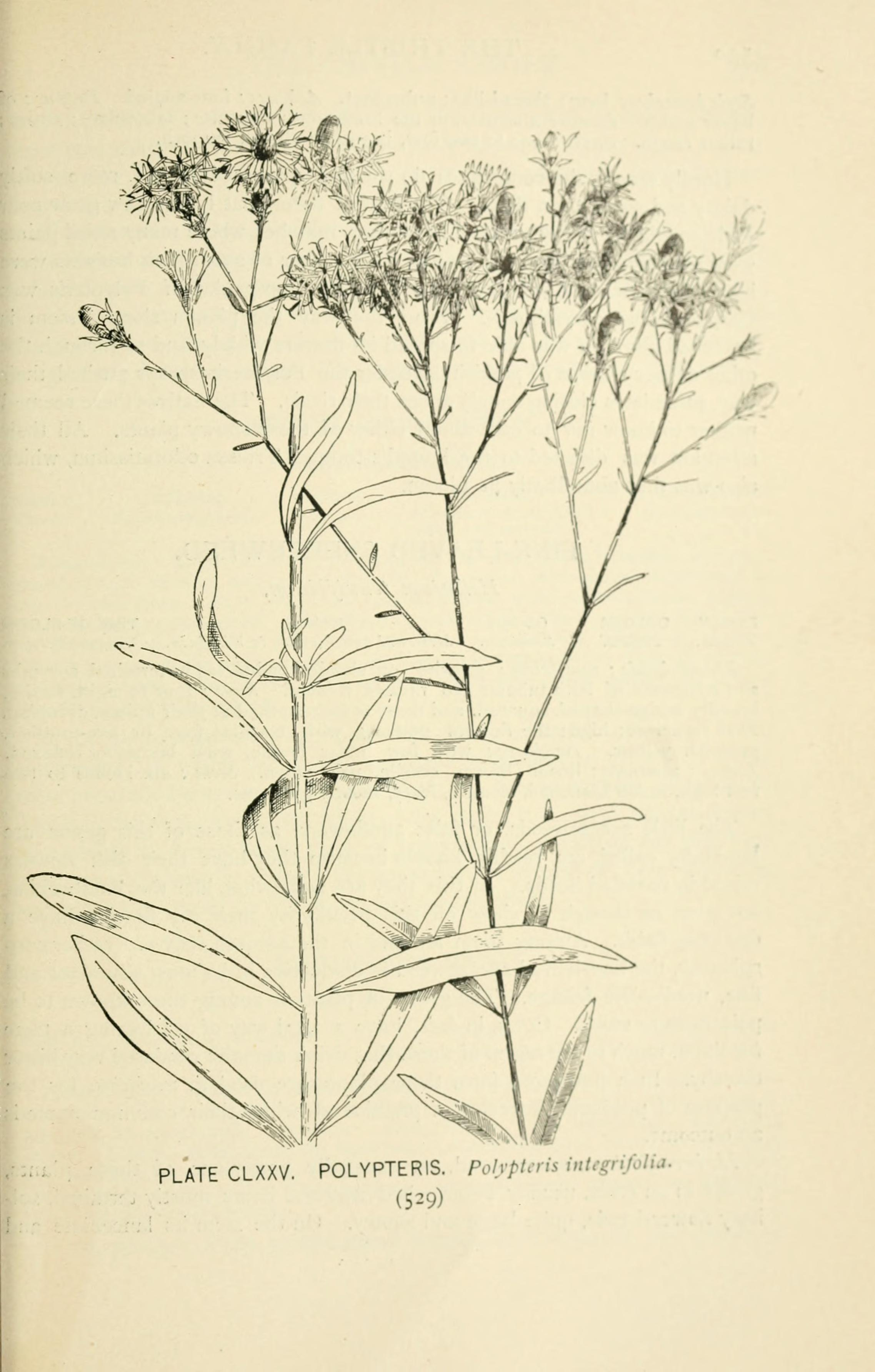

Palafoxia integrifolia was described in 1842 by Thomas Nuttall. The generic name refers to José de Palafox y Melci, while the species name is derived from the Latin word integrifolius, meaning "having entire leaves". Polypteris integrifolia is a valid synonym.

== Distribution and habitat ==
Palafoxia integrifolia is found in the states of Georgia and Florida, where it grows in sandy uplands.

== Ecology ==
Like other Palafoxia species, P. integrifolia is attractive to birds and insects, which aid in pollination.
