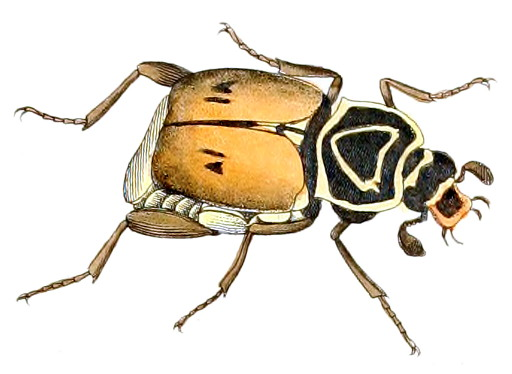

Scientific classification
- Kingdom: Animalia
- Phylum: Arthropoda
- Clade: Pancrustacea
- Class: Insecta
- Order: Coleoptera
- Suborder: Polyphaga
- Infraorder: Scarabaeiformia
- Family: Scarabaeidae
- Genus: Trigonopeltastes
- Species: T. delta

Binomial name
- Trigonopeltastes delta (Forster, 1771)

Synonyms
- Scarabaeus delta Forster, 1771

= Trigonopeltastes delta =

Species of beetle

Trigonopeltastes delta, the delta flower scarab or D beetle, is a diurnal species of scarab beetle native to the southeastern United States, though their range extends as far north as New Jersey.

== Description ==
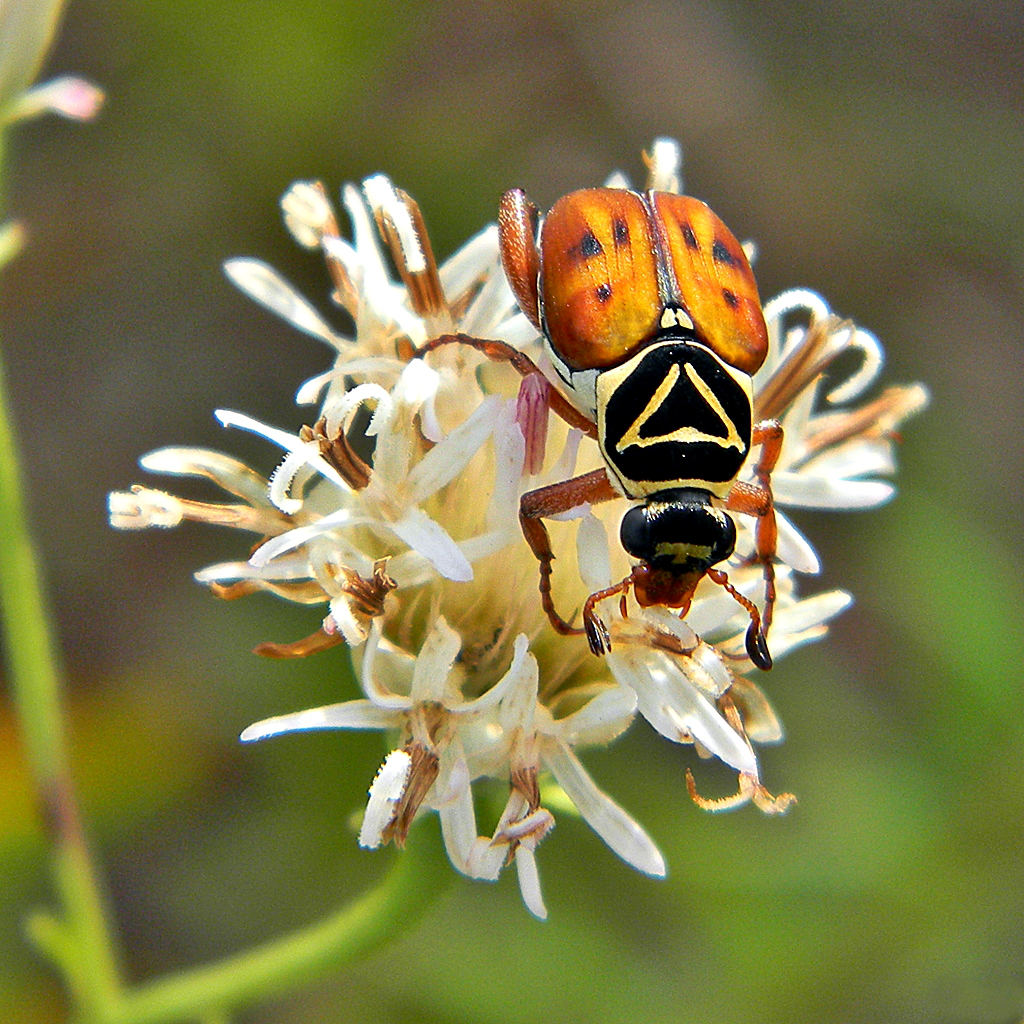
Adult on a coastalplain palafox flower.

Adults measure 8-10 millimeters in length, and can be identified by the yellow triangle on the pronotum, which resembles the defensive coloration of many wasps and has been theorized to act as Batesian mimicry. They can be found from late spring through the summer on flowers, including those of Queen Anne's lace and New Jersey tea.

== Etymology ==
The generic name is derived from Greek words meaning "triangular shield", with the specific name "delta" referring to the pattern on the dorsal side of the beetle's prothorax, which is reminiscent of the Greek letter delta.
