= Honora sciurella =

Scientific classification
- Domain: Eukaryota
- Kingdom: Animalia
- Phylum: Arthropoda
- Class: Insecta
- Order: Lepidoptera
- Family: Pyralidae
- Genus: Honora
- Species: H. sciurella

Binomial name
- Honora sciurella Ragonot, 1887

Species of moth

Honora sciurella is a species of snout moth in the genus Honora. It was described by Émile Louis Ragonot in 1887 and is found in the US state of California.
