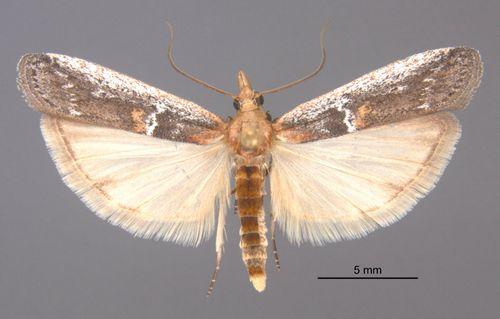

Scientific classification
- Domain: Eukaryota
- Kingdom: Animalia
- Phylum: Arthropoda
- Class: Insecta
- Order: Lepidoptera
- Family: Pyralidae
- Genus: Honora
- Species: H. subsciurella

Binomial name
- Honora subsciurella Ragonot, 1887

= Honora subsciurella =

Species of moth

Honora subsciurella is a species of snout moth in the genus Honora. It was described by Émile Louis Ragonot in 1887 and is found in North America, including Colorado and California.
