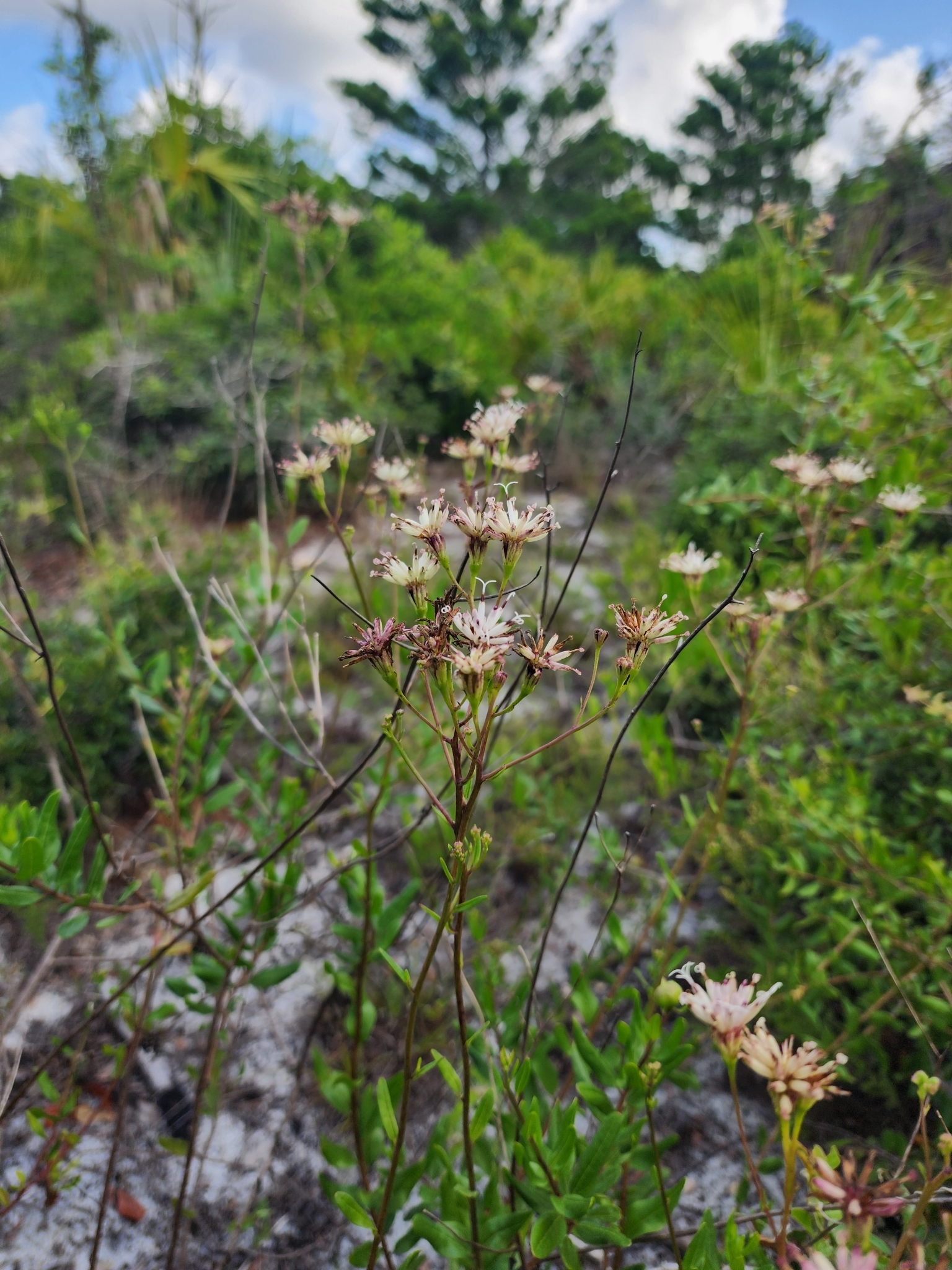

Conservation status
- Apparently Secure (NatureServe)

Scientific classification
- Kingdom: Plantae
- Clade: Tracheophytes
- Clade: Angiosperms
- Clade: Eudicots
- Clade: Asterids
- Order: Asterales
- Family: Asteraceae
- Genus: Palafoxia
- Species: P. feayi

Binomial name
- Palafoxia feayi A.Gray

= Palafoxia feayi =

Species of flowering plant

Palafoxia feayi, commonly called Feay's palafox, is a species of perennial flowering plant endemic to peninsular Florida.

== Description ==
Palafoxia feayi ranges from 3 to 15 decimeters (approximately 12 to 59 inches) in height. The leaves are oppositely arranged and range from elliptic to ovate in shape. Their margin is entire. P. feayi's inflorescence heads may have 10 to 30 florets at a time.

== Habitat ==
It occurs in Florida's non-coastal sandy, fire-dependent habitats including scrub, sandhill, and scrubby flatwoods.

== Fire Ecology ==
When fire occurs in P. feayi's habitat, individuals are often killed above ground. However, they possess the ability to quickly resprout from the root system post-fire. This species has adapted to establish seedlings between fire events.

== Gallery ==
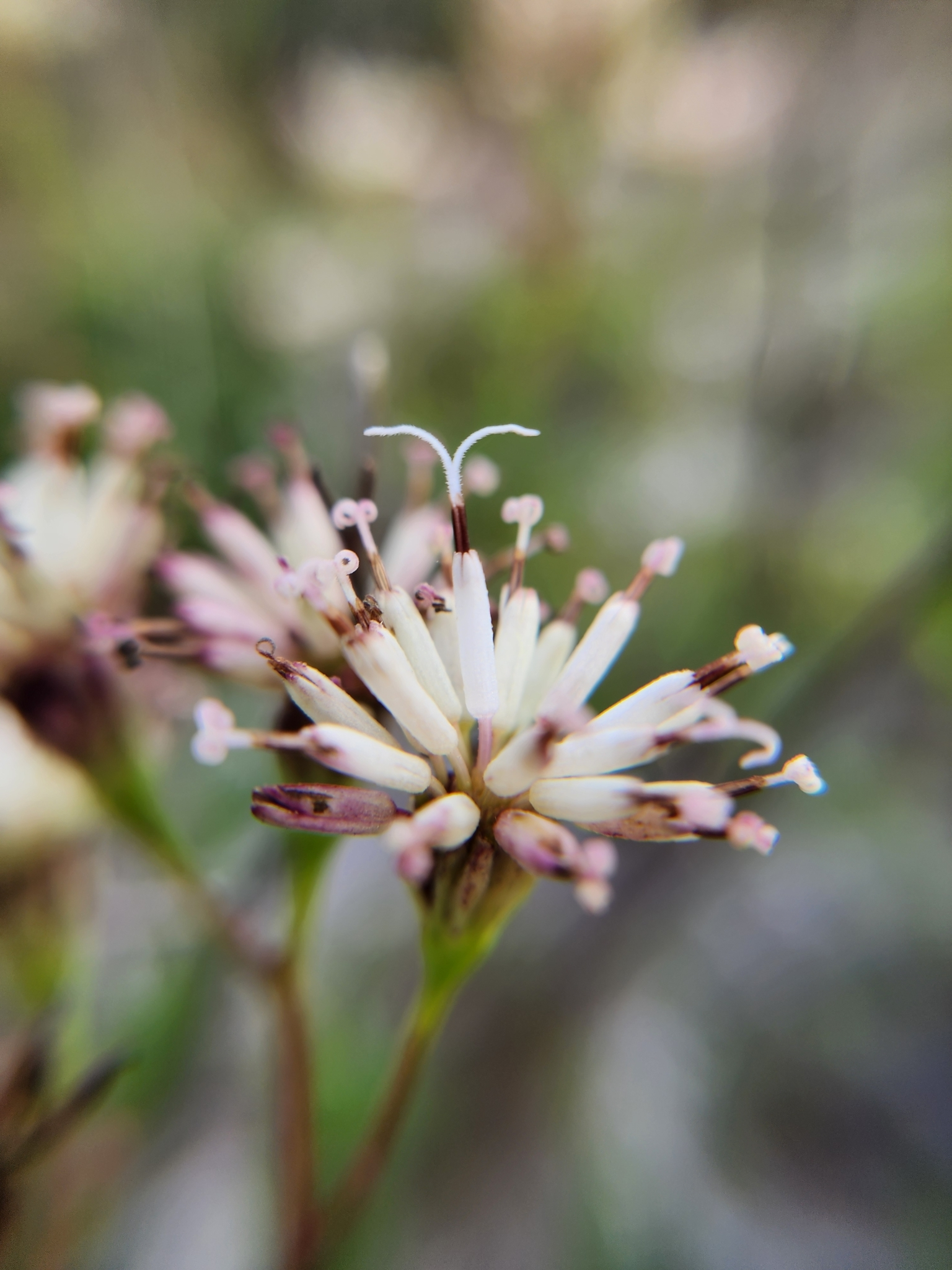
Close-up of flower
