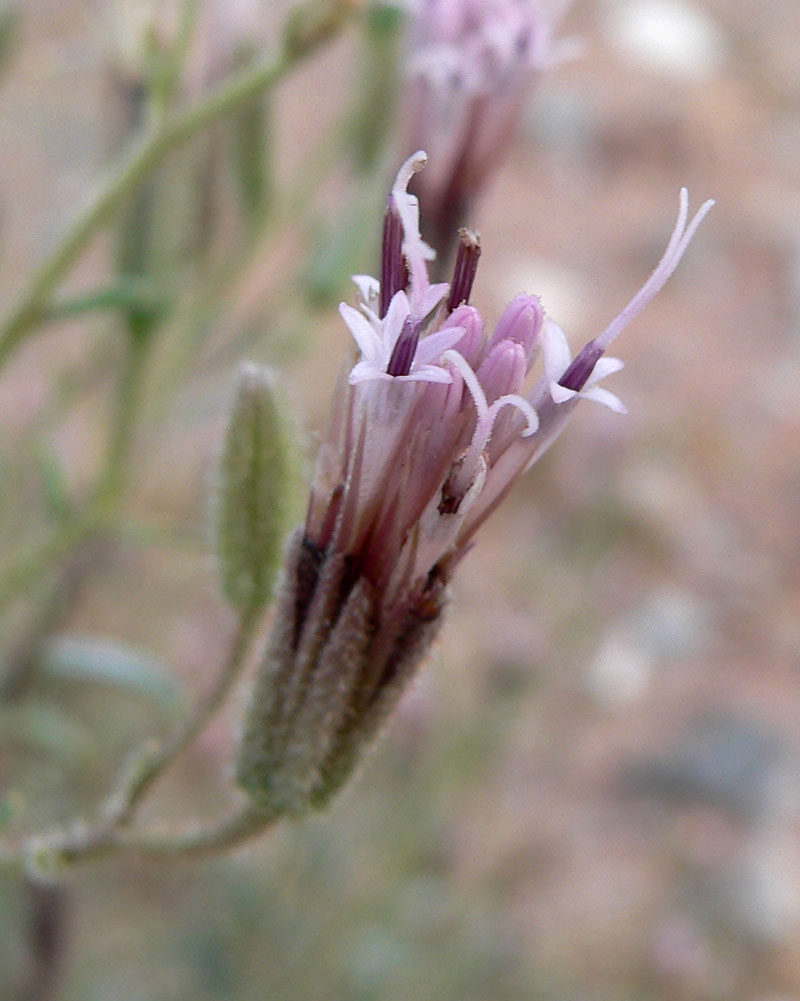
- Palafoxia arida var. arida (autonym)

Conservation status
- Secure (NatureServe)

Scientific classification
- Kingdom: Plantae
- Clade: Tracheophytes
- Clade: Angiosperms
- Clade: Eudicots
- Clade: Asterids
- Order: Asterales
- Family: Asteraceae
- Genus: Palafoxia
- Species: P. arida

Binomial name
- Palafoxia arida B.L.Turner & M.I.Morris

= Palafoxia arida =

Species of flowering plant

Palafoxia arida is a species of flowering plant in the aster family, known by the common names desert palafox and Spanish needle.

== Distribution ==
It is native to the Mojave Desert and Sonoran Desert ecoregions of California, the Southwestern United States, and northwestern Mexico.

== Description ==
Palafoxia arida is an annual herb producing an erect, branching, glandular stem. The rough-haired leaves are linear or lance-shaped and may exceed 10 centimeters long.

The inflorescence is an array of up to 40 flower heads. The cylindrical heads are about 2 to 3 centimeters long, lined with long, pointed phyllaries, and bearing up to 40 pink or white tubular disc florets.

The fruit is an achene over a centimeter long including the pappus.

=== Varieties ===
There are two varieties that are no longer accepted:

- Palafoxia arida var. arida — desert needle, desert palafox
- Palafoxia arida var. gigantea — giant Spanish needle; larger, reaching 2 m (6 ft 7 in) in height
