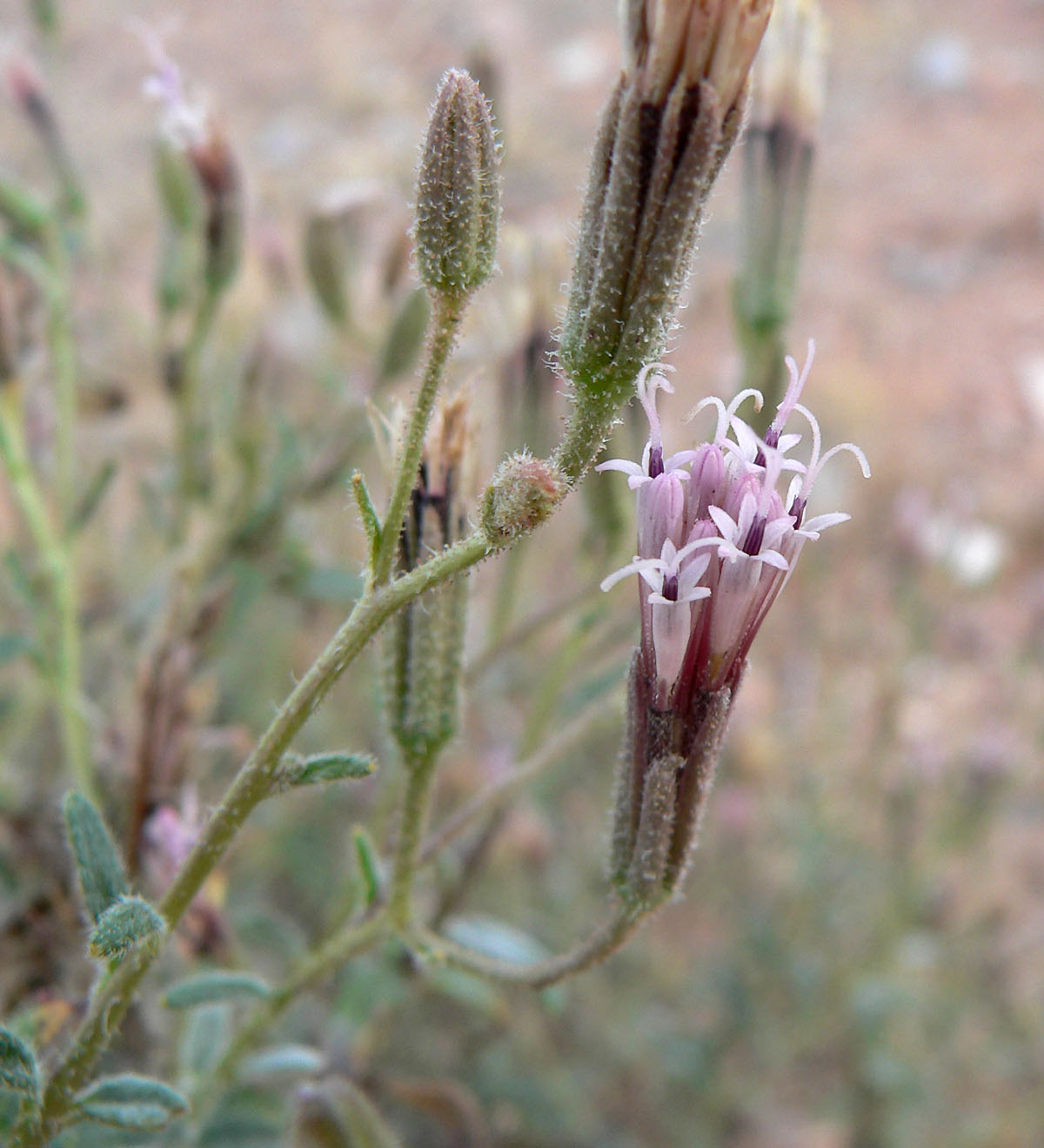
- Palafoxia arida

Scientific classification
- Kingdom: Plantae
- Clade: Embryophytes
- Clade: Tracheophytes
- Clade: Spermatophytes
- Clade: Angiosperms
- Clade: Eudicots
- Clade: Asterids
- Order: Asterales
- Family: Asteraceae
- Subfamily: Asteroideae
- Tribe: Bahieae
- Genus: Palafoxia; Lag.

Synonyms
- Paleolaria Cass.

= Palafoxia =

Genus of flowering plants

Palafoxia, or palafox, is a genus of North American flowering plants in the Bahia tribe within the Asteraceae (sunflower family).

== Description ==
The erect, slender stem grows 30–60 centimetres (12–24 in) tall, branching in the lower half and is sparsely leaved. It is glandular and hairy on the upper parts.

The glabrous, glandular leaves are lanceolate, 3–20 millimetres (1/8–3/4 in) wide and 4–7.5 cm (1 5/8–3 in) long, and are arranged alternately.

A few flower heads appear at the end of the upper branches. The reddish to pink ray florets have three narrow lobes. They are subtended by involucral bracts.

The seed-like fruit is narrow with a pappus of several pointed scales (giving rise to the common name 'Spanish Needles' for P. arida). These plants self-sow freely.

== Taxonomy ==
The genus is named after José de Palafox y Melzi, Duke of Saragossa (1776–1847), a Spanish captain-general in the Peninsular War against the invading armies of Napoleon.

Species

- Palafoxia arida B.L. Turner & Morris : Spanish needles, desert palafox - Baja California Sur, Sonora, CA AZ NV UT
- Palafoxia callosa (Nutt.) Torr. & Gray : small palafox - Coahuila, TX LA MS AR MO OK
- Palafoxia feayi A.Gray : Feay's palafox - FL
- Palafoxia hookeriana Torr. & Gray : sand palafox - TX
- Palafoxia integrifolia (Nutt.) Torr. & Gray : coastalplain palafox - FL GA
- Palafoxia lindenii A.Gray - Veracruz
- Palafoxia linearis (Cav.) Lag. - Baja California Sur, Sonora, Sinaloa, Chihuahua, California (San Bernardino Co)
- Palafoxia reverchonii (Bush) Cory : Reverchon's palafox - TX
- Palafoxia riograndensis Cory : Rio Grande palafox - Coahuila, Texas (Big Bend area)
- Palafoxia rosea (Bush) Cory : rosy palafox - Nuevo León
- Palafoxia sphacelata (Nutt. ex Torr.) Cory : showy palafox, sand palafox, rotting palafox - Chihuahua, Veracruz, TX NM OK KS NE CO
- Palafoxia texana DC. :Texas palafox - Nuevo León, Coahuila, Tamaulipas, Nuevo León, Veracruz, TX LA FL

== Distribution and habitat ==
These are drought-tolerant, annual herbs growing on sandy plains, dunes, deserts (Mojave desert, Sonoran desert) and rangeland, native to the United States and Mexico. P. callosa is naturalised in Hawaii.

== Ecology ==
They are attractive to bees, butterflies and birds and are used as food plants by the larvae of some Lepidoptera species including Schinia niveicosta, which feeds exclusively on P. linearis.

== Uses ==
Palafoxia rosea (Rosy palafox) has been used in folk medicine for the treatment of fever, nausea and chills.
