= Galasa rubidana =

Scientific classification
- Kingdom: Animalia
- Phylum: Arthropoda
- Class: Insecta
- Order: Lepidoptera
- Family: Pyralidae
- Genus: Galasa
- Species: G. rubidana

Binomial name
- Galasa rubidana Walker, 1866

Species of moth

Galasa rubidana is a species of snout moth in the genus Galasa. It was described by Francis Walker in 1866 and is known from Jamaica.
