= Galasa major =

Scientific classification
- Domain: Eukaryota
- Kingdom: Animalia
- Phylum: Arthropoda
- Class: Insecta
- Order: Lepidoptera
- Family: Pyralidae
- Genus: Galasa
- Species: G. major

Binomial name
- Galasa major (Warren, 1891)

Synonyms
- Tetraschistis major Warren, 1891

Species of moth

Galasa major is a species of snout moth in the genus Galasa. It was described by William Warren in 1891, and is known from Colombia.
