= Galasa cuprealis =

Scientific classification
- Kingdom: Animalia
- Phylum: Arthropoda
- Class: Insecta
- Order: Lepidoptera
- Family: Pyralidae
- Genus: Galasa
- Species: G. cuprealis

Binomial name
- Galasa cuprealis (Hampson, 1906)

Synonyms
- Caphys cuprealis Hampson, 1906

Species of moth

Galasa cuprealis is a species of snout moth in the genus Galasa. It was described by George Hampson in 1906 and is known from Paraguay.
