= Galasa stygialis =

Scientific classification
- Kingdom: Animalia
- Phylum: Arthropoda
- Class: Insecta
- Order: Lepidoptera
- Family: Pyralidae
- Genus: Galasa
- Species: G. stygialis

Binomial name
- Galasa stygialis Dyar, 1914

Species of moth

Galasa stygialis is a species of snout moth in the genus Galasa. It was described by Harrison Gray Dyar Jr. in 1914, and is known from Panama.
