= Galasa rugosalis =

Scientific classification
- Kingdom: Animalia
- Phylum: Arthropoda
- Class: Insecta
- Order: Lepidoptera
- Family: Pyralidae
- Genus: Galasa
- Species: G. rugosalis

Binomial name
- Galasa rugosalis Dyar, 1913

Species of moth

Galasa rugosalis is a species of snout moth in the genus Galasa. It was described by Harrison Gray Dyar Jr. in 1913 and is known from French Guiana.
