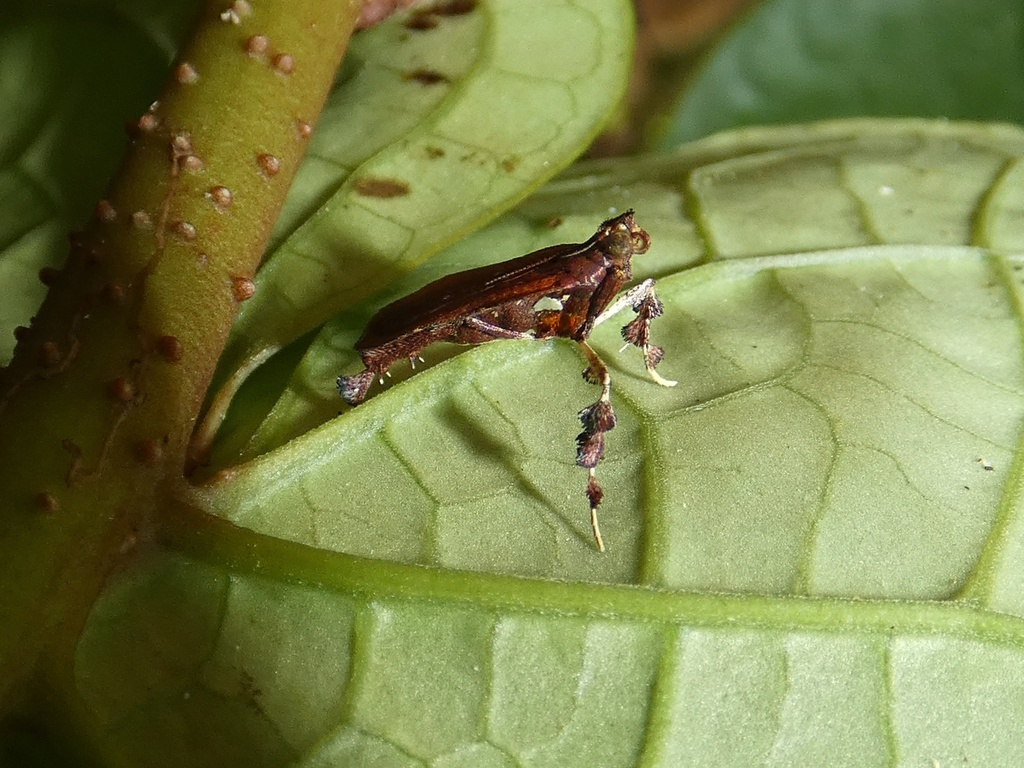

Scientific classification
- Kingdom: Animalia
- Phylum: Arthropoda
- Class: Insecta
- Order: Lepidoptera
- Family: Pyralidae
- Genus: Galasa
- Species: G. costalis

Binomial name
- Galasa costalis Dyar, 1913

= Galasa costalis =

Species of moth

Galasa costalis is a species of snout moth in the genus Galasa. It was described by Harrison Gray Dyar Jr. in 1913 and is known from Costa Rica.
