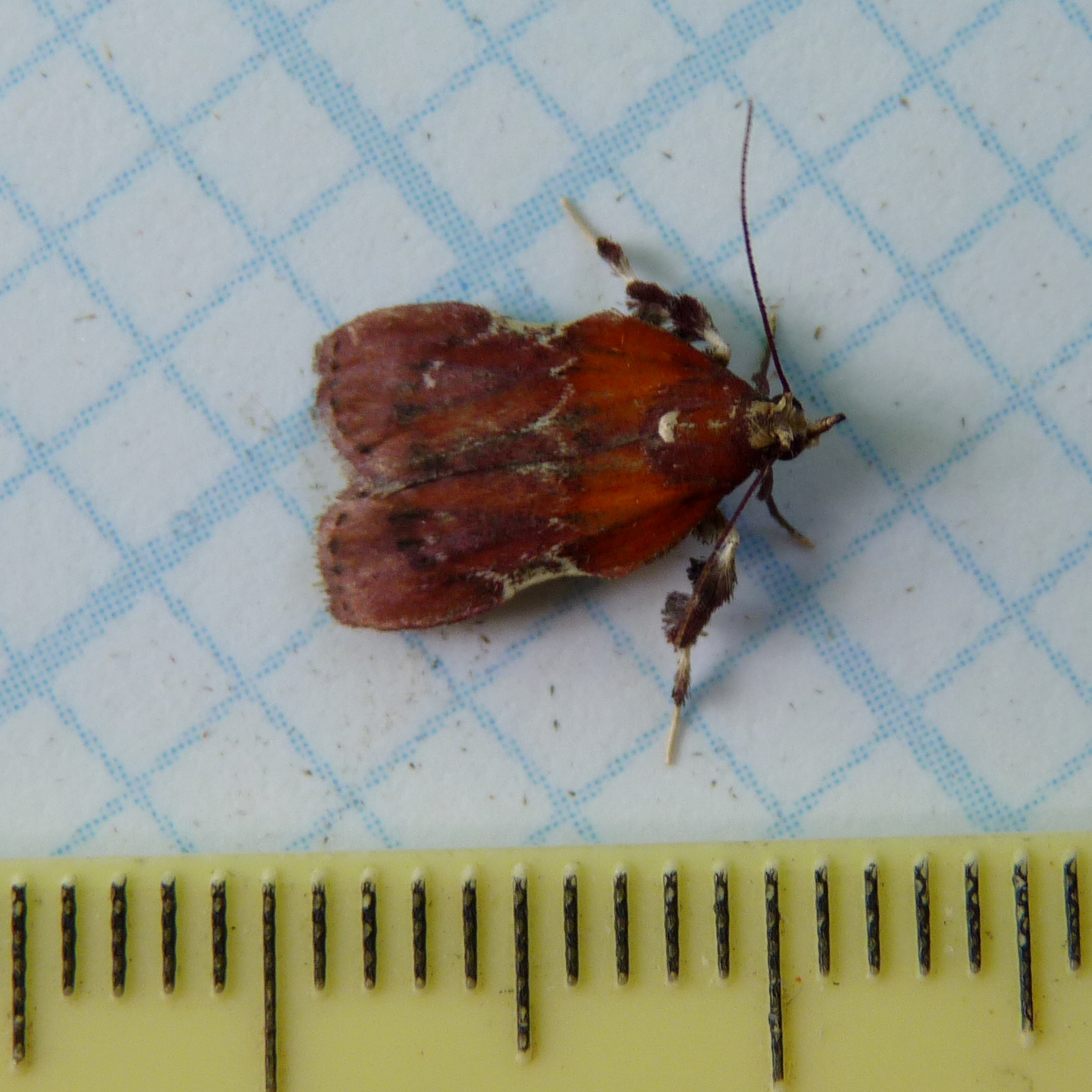

Scientific classification
- Kingdom: Animalia
- Phylum: Arthropoda
- Clade: Pancrustacea
- Class: Insecta
- Order: Lepidoptera
- Family: Pyralidae
- Genus: Galasa
- Species: G. nigrinodis

Binomial name
- Galasa nigrinodis (Zeller, 1873)

Synonyms
- Cordylopeza nigrinodis Zeller, 1873; Galasa rubrana Fitch, 1891; Galasa palmipes Grote & Robinson, 1891

= Galasa nigrinodis =

Species of moth

Galasa nigrinodis, the boxwood leaftier moth or boxwood webworm, is moth of the family Pyralidae. It is found in eastern North America.

The wingspan is 13–20 mm. Adults are on wing from June to September.

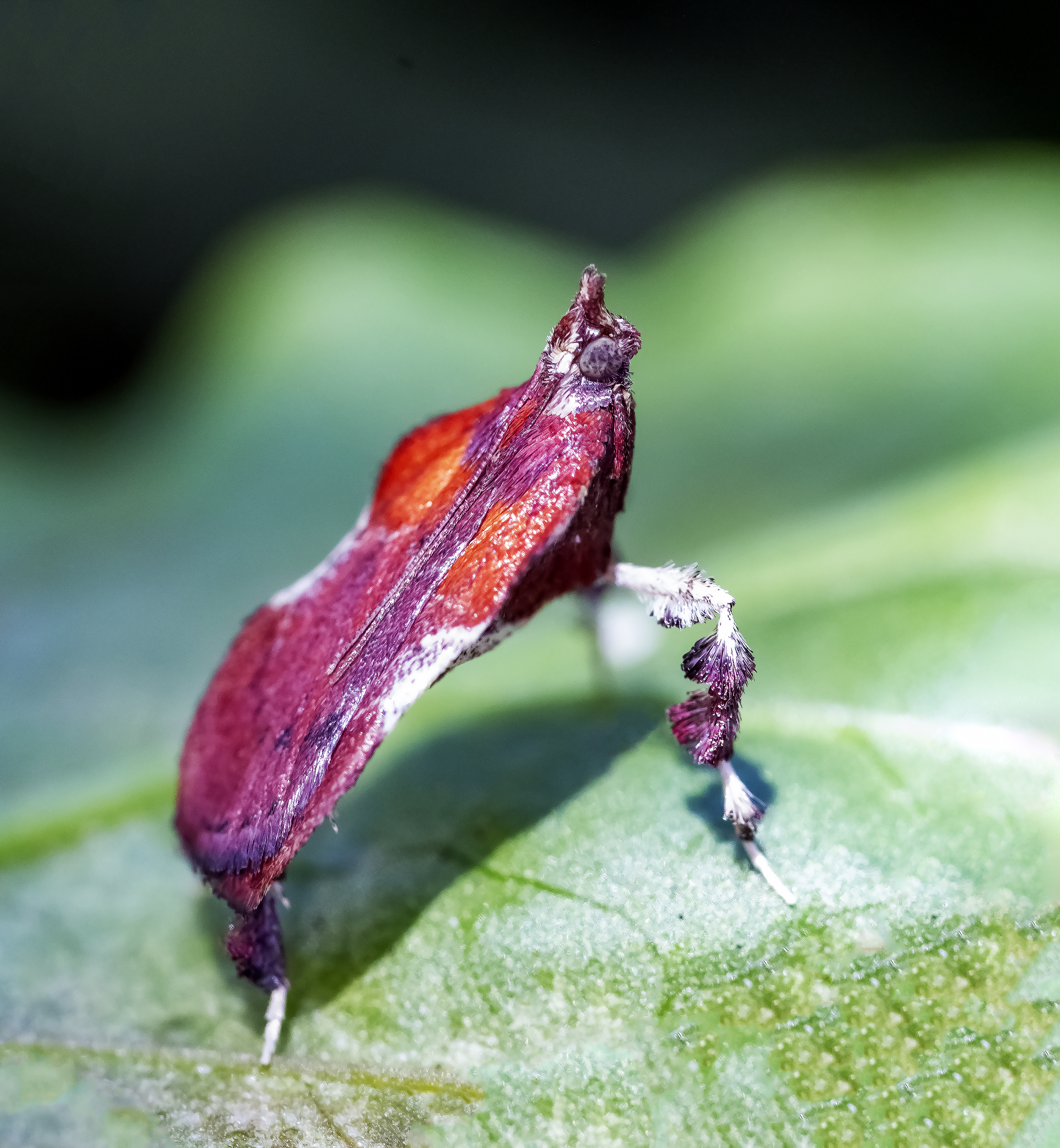
in defensive stance

The larvae feed on the leaves of Buxus species. They tie together and eat dead leaves of their host plant.
