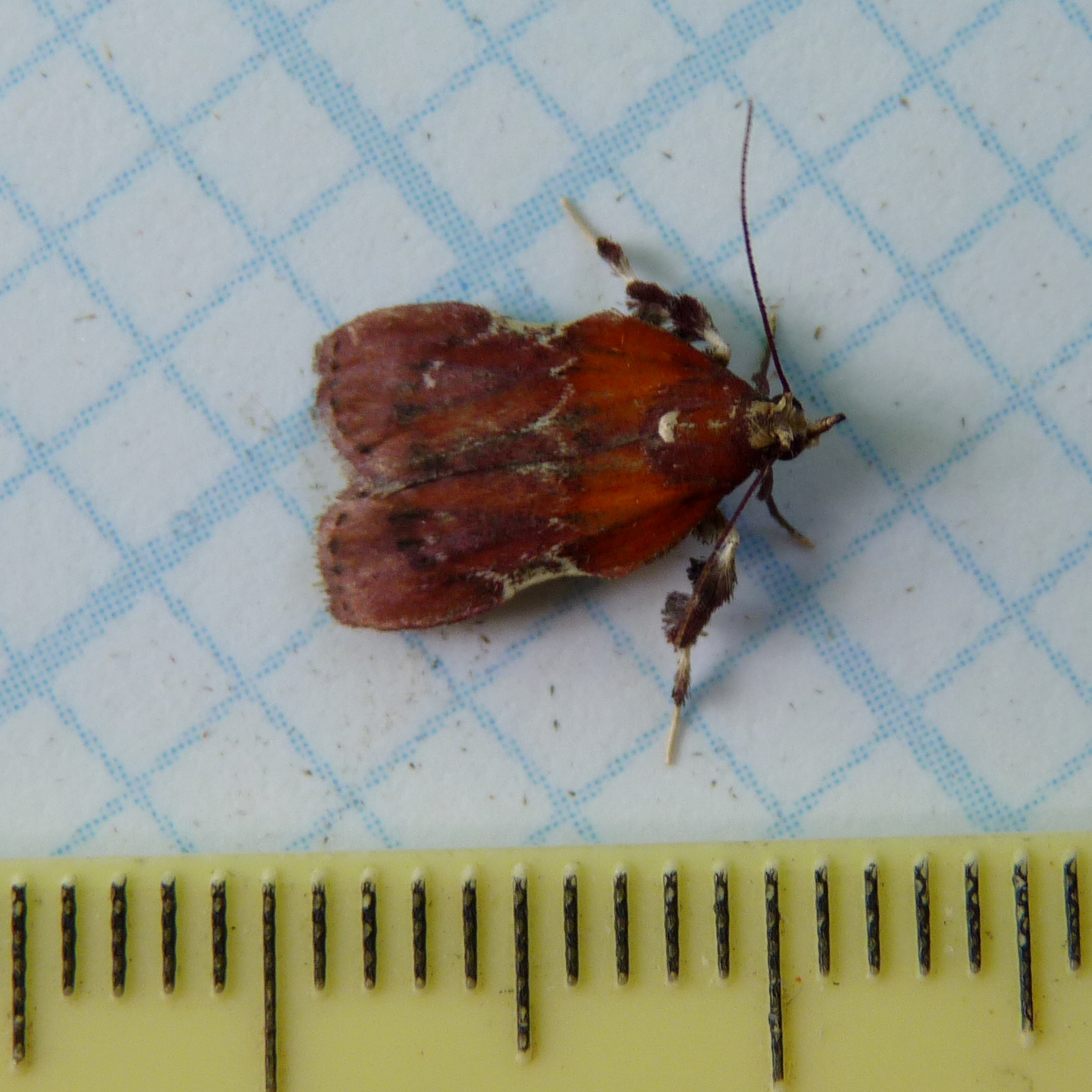
- Galasa nigrinodis

Scientific classification
- Kingdom: Animalia
- Phylum: Arthropoda
- Class: Insecta
- Order: Lepidoptera
- Family: Pyralidae
- Subfamily: Chrysauginae
- Genus: Galasa; Walker, 1866

Synonyms
- Cordylopeza Zeller, 1873

= Galasa =

Genus of moths

Galasa is a genus of snout moths. It was described by Francis Walker in 1866.

== Species ==
- Galasa belliculalis Dyar, 1914
- Galasa concordalis Dyar, 1913
- Galasa costalis Dyar, 1913
- Galasa cuprealis (Hampson, 1906)
- Galasa dilirialis Dyar, 1914
- Galasa dubitalis Dyar, 1914
- Galasa fervidalis Dyar, 1914
- Galasa lophopalis Dyar, 1914
- Galasa lutealis Dyar, 1914
- Galasa major (Warren, 1891)
- Galasa modestalis Dyar, 1913
- Galasa monitoralis Dyar, 1914
- Galasa nigrinodis (Zeller, 1873)
- Galasa nigripunctalis (Barnes & McDunnough, 1913)
- Galasa pallidalis Dyar, 1914
- Galasa relativalis Dyar, 1914
- Galasa rubidana Walker, 1866
- Galasa rugosalis Dyar, 1913
- Galasa strenualis Dyar, 1914
- Galasa stygialis Dyar, 1914
- Galasa subpallidalis Dyar, 1914
- Galasa vulgalis Dyar, 1913
