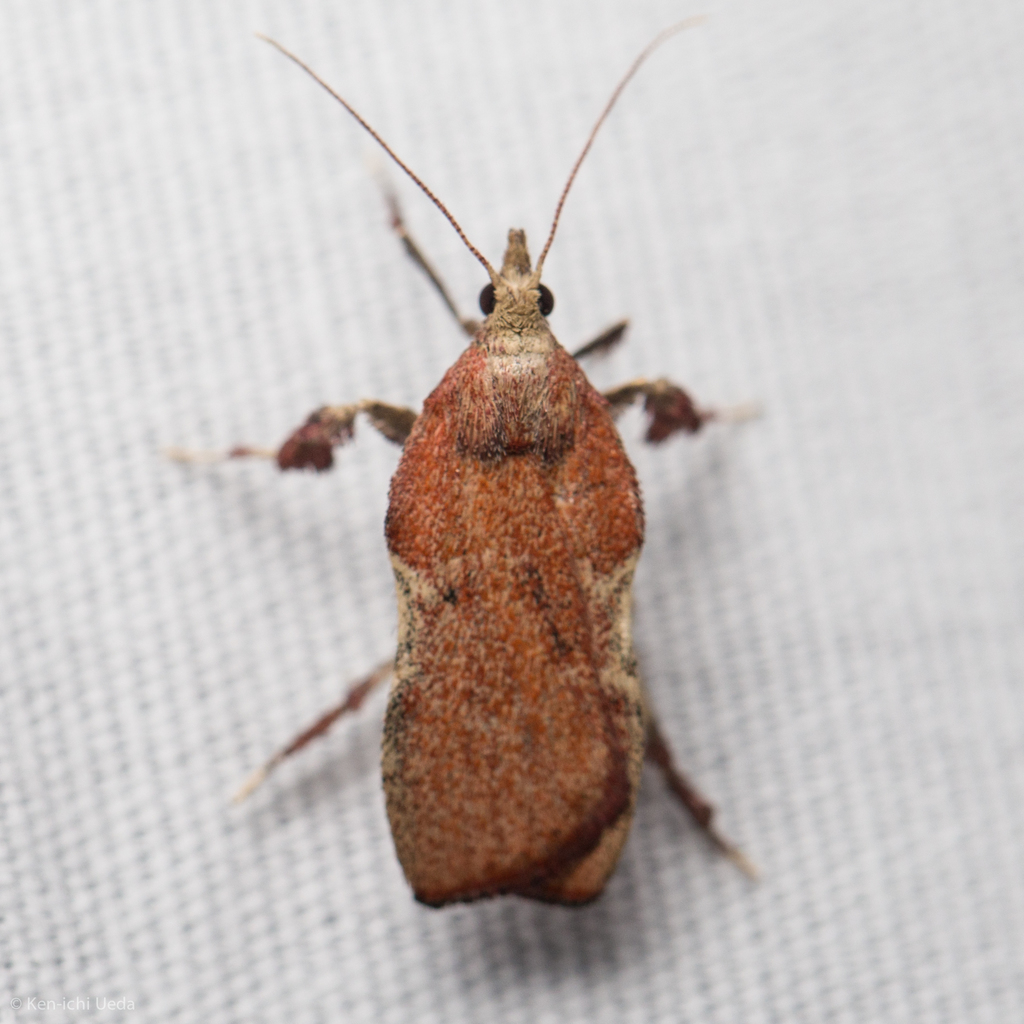

Scientific classification
- Domain: Eukaryota
- Kingdom: Animalia
- Phylum: Arthropoda
- Class: Insecta
- Order: Lepidoptera
- Family: Pyralidae
- Genus: Galasa
- Species: G. nigripunctalis

Binomial name
- Galasa nigripunctalis (Barnes & McDunnough, 1913)

Synonyms
- Cordylopeza nigripunctalis Barnes & McDunnough, 1913; Galasa fulvusana Haimbach, 1915

= Galasa nigripunctalis =

Species of moth

Galasa nigripunctalis is a species of snout moth in the genus Galasa. It was described by William Barnes and James Halliday McDunnough in 1913 and is known from the United States, including Arizona and Maryland.
