= List of Opuntia species =

List of Opuntia species.

The genus Opuntia is within the tribe Opuntieae of the subfamily Opuntioideae, in the family Cactaceae.

== List ==
Species of Opuntia currently accepted, with approximate native ranges, include:

Image	Flower	Scientific name	Common name	Distribution	Cytology
		Opuntia abjecta Small ex Britton & Rose		Florida (Keys)	2n = 22, 2n = 44
		Opuntia aciculata Griffiths	Chenille prickly pear, old man's whiskers, cowboy's red whiskers	Texas to Mexico (Nuevo León)	2n = 44
		Opuntia altomagdalenensis Xhonneux		Colombia	
		Opuntia amarilla Griffiths		Mexico (Guanajuato to Hidalgo)	2n = 88
		Opuntia anahuacensis Griffiths		Texas	
		Opuntia arechavaletae Speg.		S. Brazil to NE. Argentina	
		Opuntia arenariaEngelm.		W. Texas	
		Opuntia atrispina Griffiths		SW. Texas to Mexico (Chihuahua, Coahuila)	2n = 22, 2n = 44
		Opuntia auberi Pfeiff.		Mexico to Central America, Cuba.	
		Opuntia aurantiaca Lindl.		NE. Argentina to Uruguay	2n = 44
		Opuntia aurea E.M.Baxter		S. Utah to N. Arizona	2n=66
		Opuntia aureispina (S.Brack & K.D.Heil) Pinkava & B.D.Parfitt		SW. Texas to Mexico (Coahuila)	2n = 22
		Opuntia austrina Small		Central Florida	
		Opuntia azurea Rose		NE. Mexico (to Veracruz and Jalisco)	2n = 22
		Opuntia basilaris Engelm. & J.M.Bigelow	beavertail cactus	SW. U.S.A. to Mexico (Baja California Norte, Sonora)	2n=22
		Opuntia bonaerensis Speg.		Brazil (Rio Grande do Sul) to NE. Argentina	
		Opuntia bonplandii (Kunth) F.A.C.Weber		Ecuador.	2n = 88
		Opuntia bravoana E.M.Baxter		Mexico (Baja California Sur)	2n = 66
		Opuntia caboensis F.Mercado & León de la Luz		Mexico (Baja California Sur).	
		Opuntia camanchica Engelm. & J.M.Bigelow		SE. California to W. Oklahoma and W. & S. Texas	2n = 66
		Opuntia canterae Arechav.		SW. & S. Uruguay	
		Opuntia caracassana Salm-Dyck		S. Caribbean to Colombia	2n = 22
		Opuntia cespitosa Raf.		SE. Canada to E. Central & E. U.S.A.	
		Opuntia chaffeyi Britton & Rose		NE. Mexico	2n = 44
		Opuntia chiangiana Scheinvar & Manzanero		Mexico (Oaxaca)	
		Opuntia chisosensis (M.S.Anthony) D.J.Ferguson		Texas to Mexico (Coahuila)	2n = 22
		Opuntia chlorotica Engelm. & J.M.Bigelow	pancake prickly pear	native to southwest USA and the Sonoran and Mojave deserts	2n=22
		Opuntia clarkiorum Rebman		Mexico (Baja California Norte)	
		Opuntia cochenillifera (L.) Mill.		Mexico.	
		Opuntia colubrina A. Cast		Argentina	
		Opuntia crassa Haw.		Mexico (México State to Guanajuato).	2n = 88
		Opuntia crystalenia Griffiths		Mexico (Tabasco)	
		Opuntia cubensis Britton & Rose		Cuba	2n = 44
		Opuntia curassavica (L.) Mill.		Caribbean to N. Venezuela	
		Opuntia curvispina Griffiths		S. Nevada to SE. California and W. & N. Arizona.	2n = 44
		Opuntia deamii Rose		Mexico (Chiapas) to Honduras	
		Opuntia decumbens Salm-Dyck		El Salvador, Guatemala, Honduras, Mexico Central, Mexico, Nicaragua, Panamá	
		Opuntia dejecta Salm-Dyck		Mexico to Nicaragua, Cuba	
		Opuntia delafuentiana Martínez-Gonz., Luna-Vega, Gallegos & García-Sand.		Mexico (Hidalgo)	
		Opuntia depressa Rose		SW. & Central Mexico (to Veracruz)	
		Opuntia diploursina Stock, N.Hussey & Beckstrom		Grand Canyon and Lake Mead National Recreation Area	2n=22
		Opuntia discolor Britton & Rose		Bolivia to N. Argentina	
		Opuntia drummondii Graham		Alabama, Florida, Georgia, Mississippi, North Carolina, South Carolina, Texas	
		Opuntia dulcis Engelm.		New Mexico to W. Texas.	2n = 66
		Opuntia eichlamii Rose		Mexico (Chiapas) to Guatemala	2n = 66
		Opuntia elata Link & Otto ex Salm-Dyck		S. Bolivia to Brazil (Rio Grande do Sul) and N. to Argentina	2n = 22, 2n = 44
		Opuntia elatior Mill.		S. Caribbean, Costa Rica to Venezuela	2n = 22, 2n = 66
		Opuntia elizondoana E.Sánchez & Villaseñor		Mexico (Guanajuato to San Luis Potosí).	2n = 44
		Opuntia engelmannii Salm-Dyck ex Engelm.	Engelmann's prickly pear, cow's-tongue prickly pear, desert prickly pear, discus prickly pear, Texas prickly pear, calico cactu	Arizona, California, Louisiana, Nevada, New Mexico, Texas, Utah, Mexico	2n=66
		Opuntia erinacea Engelm. & J.M.Bigelow		California, Nevada, Arizona, Utah and N. Mexico	
		Opuntia escuintlensis (Matuda) Lodé		Mexico (Chiapas)	
		Opuntia excelsa Sánchez-Mej.		Mexico (to Sinaloa)	2n = 22
		Opuntia feroacantha Britton & Rose		Mexico (Sinaloa to Michoacán)	
		Opuntia ficus-indica (L.) Mill.	Indian fig opuntia	Mexico (Oaxaca)	2n = 22
		Opuntia fragilis (Nutt.) Haw.	little prickly pear, brittle cactus	the Great Plains, parts of the Midwest and in several Canadian provinces, up to 56°N	2n = 66
		Opuntia fuliginosa Griffiths		Mexico	2n = 88
		Opuntia galapageia Hensl.	Galápagos prickly pear	Galápagos Islands	2n = 66
		Opuntia gallegiana Scheinvar & Olalde		Mexico (Zacatecas).	
		Opuntia gosseliniana F.A.C.Weber	violet prickly pear	Arizona to Mexico (Sonora)	2n = 22
		Opuntia guatemalensis Britton & Rose		Costa Rica, El Salvador, Guatemala, Honduras, Mexico (Veracruz, Oaxaca), Nicaragua	
		Opuntia guilanchi Griffiths		Mexico	
		Opuntia hitchcockii J.G.Ortega		Mexico (Sinaloa, Nayarit)	
		Opuntia hondurensis Standl.		Honduras	
		Opuntia howeyi J.A.Purpus		Mexico (Zacatecas)	
		Opuntia huajuapensis Bravo		Mexico (Veracruz, Puebla, Oaxaca)	
		Opuntia humifusa (Raf.) Raf.	eastern prickly pear	humid regions of Eastern United States and northerly regions into Canada, Mexico (Tamaulipas, San Luis Potosí)	n = 22, 2n=44
		Opuntia hyptiacantha F.A.C.Weber		Mexico.	2n = 66
		Opuntia inaequilateralis A.Berger		Peru.	2n = 66
		Opuntia inaperta (Schott ex Griffiths) D.R.Hunt		SE. Mexico (to Veracruz)	
		Opuntia jaliscana Bravo		Mexico	
		Opuntia jamaicensis Britton & Harris		Jamaica	2n = 22
		Opuntia kingstoniana Guiggi		Jamaica.	
		Opuntia lagunae E.M.Baxter		Mexico (Baja California Sur)	
		Opuntia lasiacantha Pfeiff.		Mexico	2n = 88
		Opuntia leucotricha DC.	arborescent prickly pear, Aaron's beard cactus, semaphore cactus, Duraznillo blanco, nopal blanco	N. & W. Mexico	2n = 44
		Opuntia littoralis (Engelm.) Cockerell	coastal prickly pear, sprawling prickly pear	California to Mexico (Baja California Norte)	2n = 66
		Opuntia lutea (Rose) D.R.Hunt		Mexico (Oaxaca, Chiapas), Costa Rica, Guatemala, Honduras, Nicaragua	
		Opuntia mackensenii Rose		Texas	2n = 44
		Opuntia macrocentra Engelm.	black-spined prickly pear, purple prickly pear	southwest USA and northern Mexico	2n = 22
		Opuntia macrorhiza Engelm.	Plains prickly pear	Great Plains except for the northernmost areas (not found in North Dakota), and extending sporadically eastward as far as Kentucky	2n = 22, 2n=44
		Opuntia mantaroensis Guiggi		Peru	
		Opuntia martiniana (L.D.Benson) B.D.Parfitt		Arizona	
		Opuntia matudae Scheinvar	xoconostle	Mexico	2n = 66
		Opuntia maxima Mill.		Central & SW. Mexico	
		Opuntia megacantha Salm-Dyck		Mexico (to Jalisco)	2n = 66
		Opuntia megapotamica Arechav.		Argentina, Brazil, Uruguay	
		Opuntia megarrhiza Rose		Mexico (Tamaulipas, San Luis Potosí)	2n = 66
		Opuntia mesacantha Raf.		United States (Alabama, Florida, Georgia, Louisiana, Maryland, Mississippi, New Jersey, North Carolina, South Carolina, Tennessee, Virginia)	
		Opuntia microdasys (Lehm.) Pfeiff.	bunny ears cactus, polka-dot cactus	Mexico	2n = 22
		Opuntia militaris Britton & Rose		Cuba	
		Opuntia monacanthos (Willd.) Haw.	common prickly pear	Brazil, Paraguay, Uruguay	
		Opuntia nemoralis Griffiths		United States (Arkansas, Louisiana, Missouri, Texas)	
		Opuntia nicholii L.D.Benson		United States (Arizona, Nevada, Utah )	
		Opuntia ochrocentra Small ex Britton & Rose		Florida (Big Pine Key)	2n = 55
		Opuntia orbiculata Salm-Dyck ex Pfeiff.		United States (Arizona, Nevada, New Mexico, Oklahoma, Texas), Mexico	2n = 22, 2n = 44
		Opuntia oricola Philbrick		California to Mexico (Baja California Norte)	2n = 33, 2n = 66
		Opuntia pachyrrhiza H.M.Hern., Gómez-Hin. & Bárcenas		Mexico (Nuevo León, Querétaro, San Luis Potosí)	2n = 22
		Opuntia parviclada S.Arias & Gama		Mexico (Puebla, Oaxaca)	
		Opuntia peckii J.A.Purpus		Mexico	
		Opuntia perotensis Scheinvar, Olalde & Gallegos		Mexico (Veracruz)	
		Opuntia phaeacantha Engelm.	tulip prickly pear, includes plateau prickly pear, brown-spined prickly pear, Mojave prickly pear, Kingman prickly pear	United States (Arizona, California, Colorado, Kansas, Nevada, New Mexico, Oklahoma, Texas, Utah), Mexico	2n=66
		Opuntia pilifera F.A.C.Weber		Central Mexico (to Oaxaca)	2n = 88
		Opuntia pinkavae B.D.Parfitt	Pinkava prickly pear	SW. Utah to NW. Arizona	2n=88
		Opuntia pittieri Britton & Rose		Colombia	
		Opuntia polyacantha Haw.	Plains prickly pear, Starvation Prickly pear, Panhandle prickly pear	the Great Plains, Great Basin, Mojave Desert, Colorado Plateau, and the Rocky Mountains	2n=22, 2n=44
		Opuntia pottsii Salm-Dyck		SE. Arizona to W. Texas and NE. Mexico	2n = 44, 2n = 66
		Opuntia preciadoae Scheinvar, Olalde, Gallegos & J.Morales S.		N. Mexico	
		Opuntia puberula Pfeiff.		Mexico to Guatemala	2n = 66
		Opuntia pubescens H.L.Wendl. ex Pfeiff.		Mexico to Venezuela and Paraguay	2n = 44
		Opuntia pycnantha Engelm.		Mexico (Baja California Sur)	
		Opuntia quimilo K.Schum.		Argentina, Bolivia, Paraguay	2n = 22
		Opuntia quitensis F.A.C.Weber	Red Buttons opuntia	Colombia, Ecuador, Peru	2n=22, 2n =44
		Opuntia rastrera F.A.C.Weber		Mexico (to Veracruz and Jalisco)	2n = 66
		Opuntia repens Bello		Hispaniola to Virgin Islands	2n = 22, 2n = 44
		Opuntia retrorsa Speg.		Argentina, Bolivia, Brazil, Paraguay, Uruguay	
		Opuntia ritteri A.Berger		Mexico (Zacatecas)	
		Opuntia robinsonii J.G.Ortega		N. & W. Mexico	
		Opuntia robusta H.L.Wendl. ex Pfeiff.		Mexico	2n = 22, 2n = 44
		Opuntia rufida Engelm.		SW. Texas to NE. Mexico	2n = 22
		Opuntia rzedowskii Scheinvar		Mexico (México D.F.)	2n = 88
		Opuntia sanguinea Proctor		Jamaica	2n = 22
		Opuntia scheeri F.A.C.Weber		NE. Mexico (to Jalisco)	2n = 22
		Opuntia schumannii F.A.C.Weber ex A.Berger		Colombia, Venezuela	
		Opuntia setocarpa Arreola-Nava, Guzm.-Hern. & Cuevas		Mexico (Jalisco)	
		Opuntia sierralagunensis León de la Luz & F.Mercado		Mexico (Baja California Sur).	
		Opuntia soederstromiana Britton & Rose		Colombia, Ecuador	2n = 88
		Opuntia spinosibacca M.S.Anthony		SW. Texas to Mexico (Coahuila)	
		Opuntia spinulifera Salm-Dyck		E. & Central Mexico	
		Opuntia stenarthra K.Schum.		E. Bolivia to Central Paraguay and NE. Argentina	
		Opuntia stenopetala Engelm.		NE. Mexico (to Veracruz)	
		Opuntia streptacantha Lem.		Mexico to Guatemala	
		Opuntia stricta (Haw.) Haw.	erect prickly pear, spineless prickly pear	SE. U.S.A. to E. & S. Mexico	2n = 66
		Opuntia strigil Engelm.		W. Texas to NE. Mexico	2n = 22, 2n = 44
		Opuntia sulphurea G.Don ex Salm-Dyck		Bolivia to Uruguay.	2n = 22
		Opuntia tapona Engelm. ex J.M.Coult.		Mexico (Baja California Sur)	
		Opuntia tehuacana S.Arias & U.Guzmán		Mexico (Puebla, Oaxaca)	
		Opuntia tehuantepecana (Bravo) Bravo		Mexico (Oaxaca, Chiapas).	
		Opuntia tezontepecana Gallegos & Scheinvar		Mexico (Hidalgo)	
		Opuntia tomentosa Salm-Dyck		Mexico to Honduras	
		Opuntia tortispina Engelm. & J.M.Bigelow		United States (Colorado, Kansas, Nebraska, New Mexico, Oklahoma, Texas, Wyoming )	2n = 44
		Opuntia triacanthos (Willd.) Sweet		Puerto Rico to Lesser Antilles.	
		Opuntia tuna (L.) Mill.		Mexico, S. Jamaica	2n = 44
		Opuntia tunoidea Gibbes		Coastal South Carolina	
		Opuntia velutina F.A.C.Weber		Mexico.	
		Opuntia wilcoxii Britton & Rose		Mexico	
		Opuntia zacuapanensis A.Berger		Mexico (Veracruz)	
		Opuntia zamudioi Scheinvar		Mexico (Querétaro, San Luis Potosí)	2n = 88

=== Natural Hybrids ===
Image	Flower	Scientific name	Parentage	Distribution	Cytology
		Opuntia × aequatorialis Britton & Rose	O. pubescens × O. soederstromiana	Ecuador	
		Opuntia × alta Griffiths	O. engelmannii var. lindheimeri × O. stricta	SE. Texas to SW. Louisiana	
		Opuntia × andersonii H.M.Hern., Gómez-Hin. & Bárcenas	O. engelmannii × O. microdasys	NE. Mexico	
		Opuntia × carstenii R.Puente & C.Hamann	O. microdasys × O. stenopetala	Mexico (Coahuila)	
		Opuntia × charlestonensis Clokey	O. phaeacantha × O. polyacantha var erinacea.	Nevada	
		Opuntia × cochinera Griffiths	O. microdasys × O. stenopetala	Mexico (Coahuila)	
		Opuntia × coloradensis D.J.Barnett & Donnie Barnett	O. fragilis × O. polyacantha var. hystricina.	Colorado	
		Opuntia × columbiana Griffiths	O. fragilis × O. polyacantha	W. Canada to NW. U.S.A	
		Opuntia × cristalensis Oakley, Font & M.Köhler	O. elata var. obovata × O. ficus-indica.	Argentina	
		Opuntia × debreczyi Szutorisz	O. fragilis × O. polyacantha.	SW. Wyoming to NW. New Mexico	
		Opuntia × demissa Griffiths	O. littoralis × O. oricola	California	
		Opuntia × occidentalis Engelm. & J.M.Bigelow	O. engelmannii × O. littoralis × O. phaeacantha.	SW. California to Mexico (Baja California)	
		Opuntia × rooneyi M.P.Griff.	O. aureispina × O. macrocentra.	SW. Texas	
		Opuntia × vaseyi (J.M.Coult.) Britton & Rose	O. aurea × O. pinkavae	SW. Utah	
		Opuntia × woodburyi (W.H.Earle ex S.L.Welsh) Stock	O. littoralis × O. phaeacantha	SW. California	
