= Opuntia mantaroensis =

Scientific classification
- Kingdom: Plantae
- Clade: Tracheophytes
- Clade: Angiosperms
- Clade: Eudicots
- Order: Caryophyllales
- Family: Cactaceae
- Subfamily: Opuntioideae
- Tribe: Opuntieae
- Genus: Opuntia
- Species: O. mantaroensis

Binomial name
- Opuntia mantaroensis Guiggi

Species of cactus

Opuntia mantaroensis, the Río Mantaro prickly pear, is a species of prickly pear cactus in the family Cactaceae. It was described by Alessandro Guiggi, an Italian botanist.

== Distribution and ecology ==
Opuntia mantaroensis primarily grows in the Mantaro Valley (Río Mantaro Valley), Huancavelica, Peru, where scattered individuals and localities have been identified. Its range is within the dry-tropical zone of Peru, where it grows in-between other species of prickly pear cactus.

Its habitat is usually temperate, with a rainy season from November to April, a winter season from May to July, and a dry season from August to October.

The Mantaro Valley's elevation is moderately high, being 3,150 m (10,334 feet) to 4,200 m (13,779 feet), making Opuntia mantaroensis a high elevation cactus species.

== Conservation and classification ==
No conservation status has been evaluated for Opuntia mantaroensis yet, but there could be one in the future.

Opuntia mantaroensis was originally assigned under the species Opuntia inaequilateralis, but was later assigned to its own species. Friedrich Ritter (German botanist) had mistakenly misidentified the two species, which resulted in its misclassification.
