= Opuntia pachyrrhiza =

Conservation status
- Endangered (IUCN 3.1)

Scientific classification
- Kingdom: Plantae
- Clade: Tracheophytes
- Clade: Angiosperms
- Clade: Eudicots
- Order: Caryophyllales
- Family: Cactaceae
- Genus: Opuntia
- Species: O. pachyrrhiza

Binomial name
- Opuntia pachyrrhiza H.M.Hern., Gómez-Hin. & Bárcenas

Species of cactus

Opuntia pachyrrhiza is a species of plant in the family Cactaceae. It is endemic to Mexico. Its natural habitat is subtropical or tropical dry lowland grassland. It is threatened by habitat loss.
