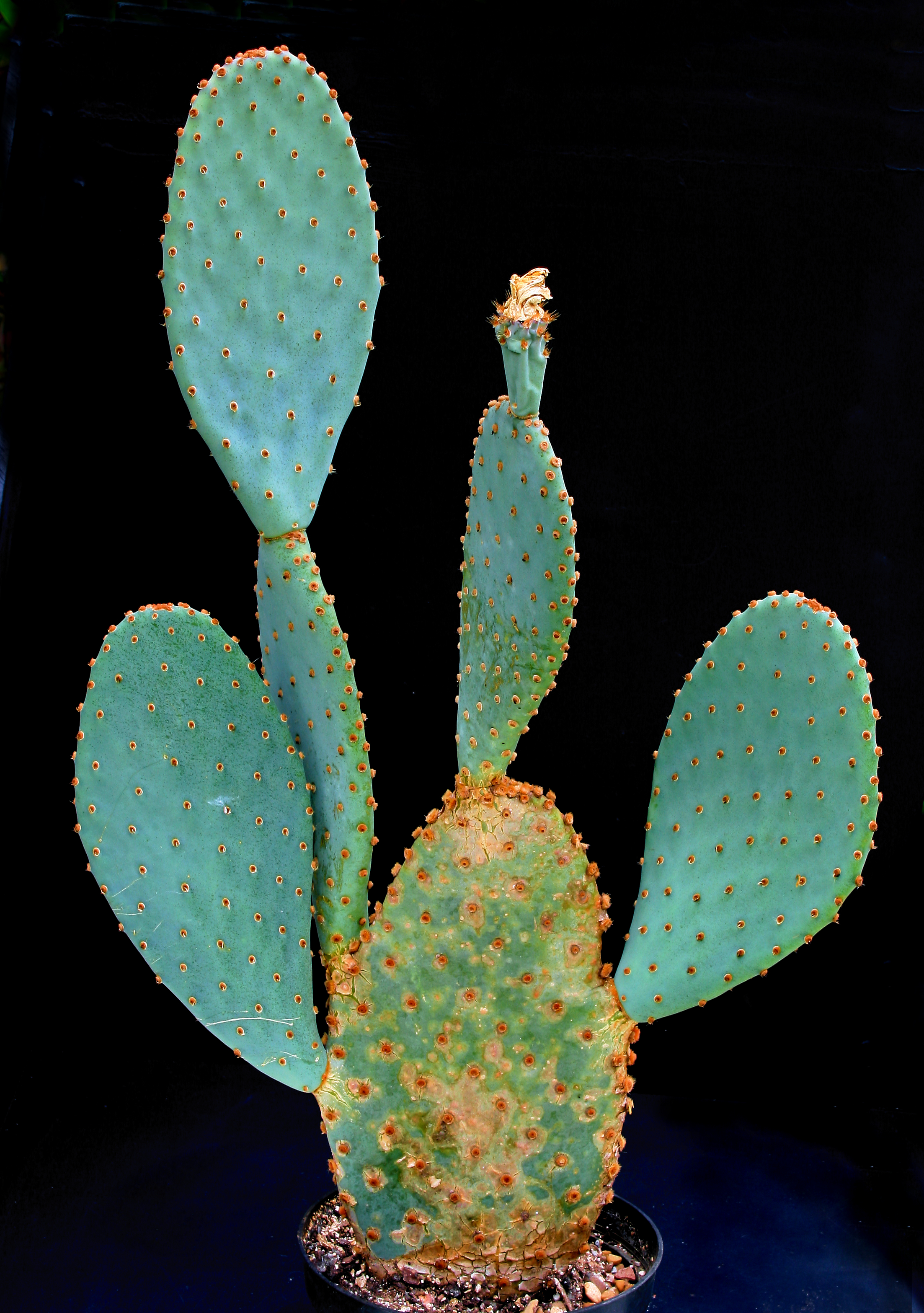

Scientific classification
- Kingdom: Plantae
- Clade: Tracheophytes
- Clade: Angiosperms
- Clade: Eudicots
- Order: Caryophyllales
- Family: Cactaceae
- Genus: Opuntia
- Species: O. azurea

Binomial name
- Opuntia azurea Rose

= Opuntia azurea =

Variety of cactus

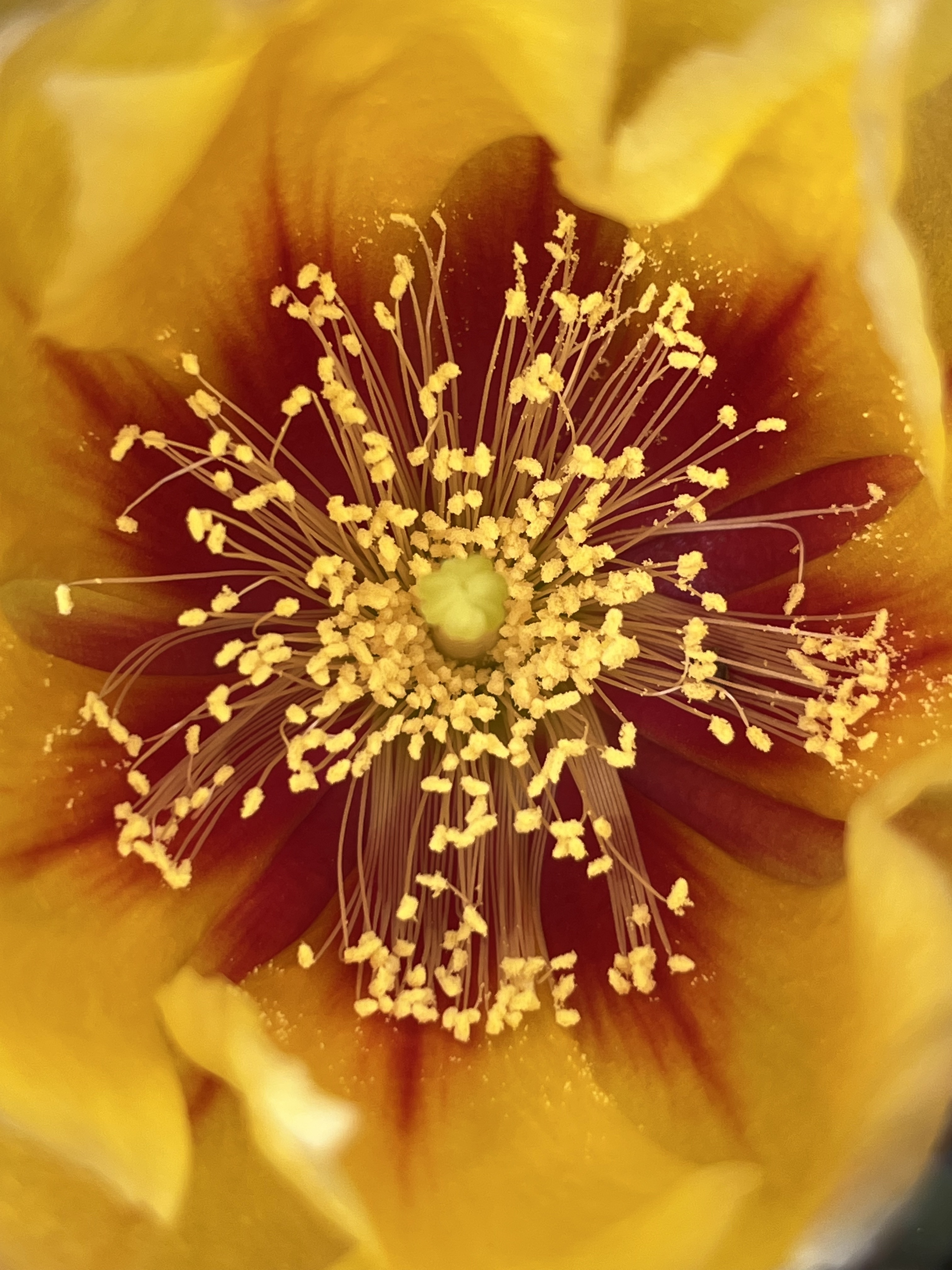
Close up on a flower of Opuntia azurea in Majorelle's garden.

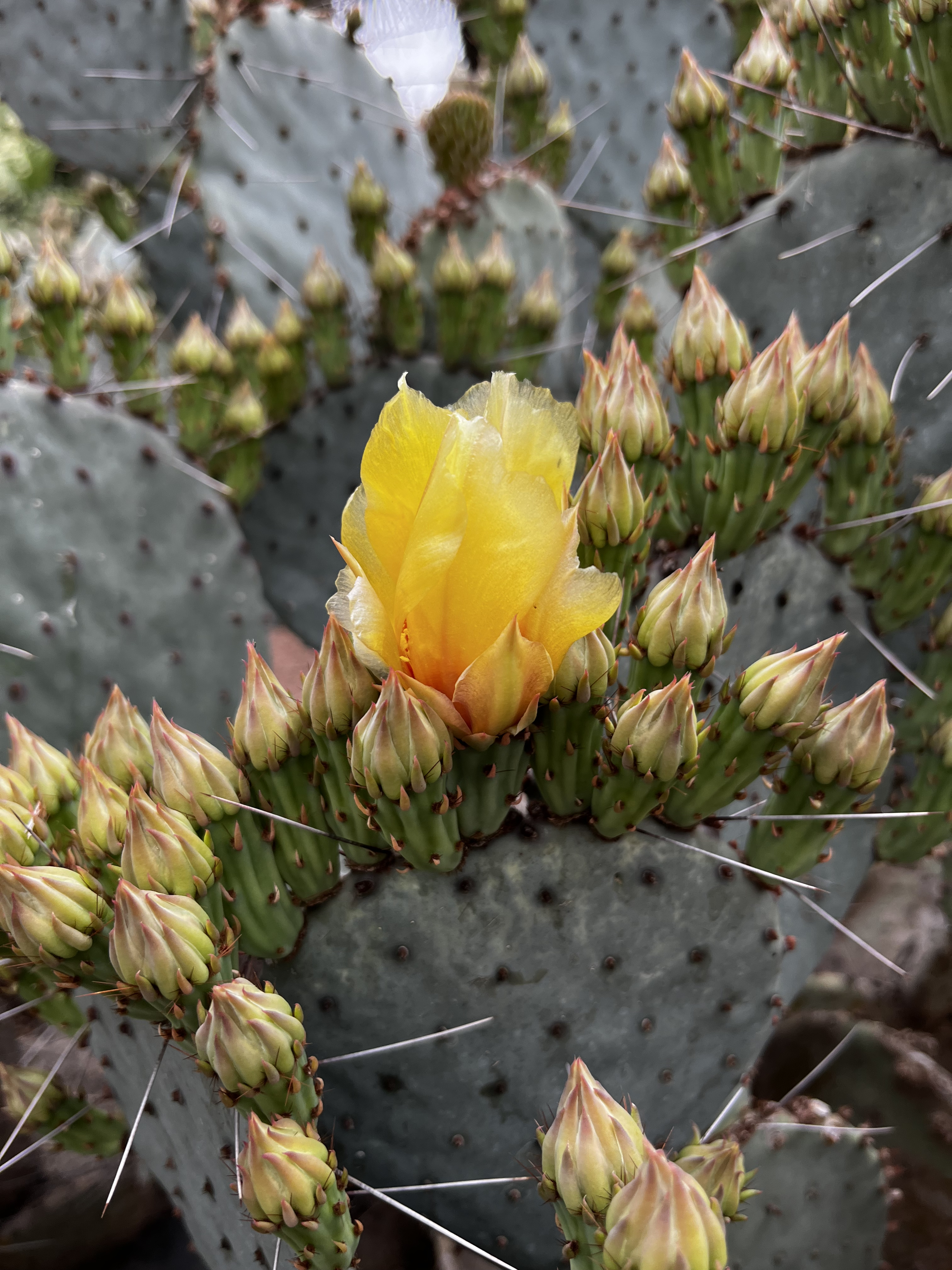
Opuntia azurea in Majorelle's garden.

Opuntia azurea, the purple prickly pear or coyotillo, is a prickly pear that is native to Texas and Mexico.

== Description ==
The plant flowers from March to May, with bright yellow flowers bearing red centres which produce red/purple fruits. Opuntia azurea forms sprawling clusters, two to three feet high.

== Variation ==
Its subspecies may include:

- O. azurea aureispina
- O. azurea discolor
- O. azurea azurea
- O. azurea diplopurpurea
- O. azurea parva.
- O. azurea arueispina

However, instead of subspecies, five varieties have been described and ssp. "arueispina" is not recognized.

- O. aureispina
- O. azurea
- O. discolor
- O. diplopurpurea, and
- O. parva.

== Distribution and habitat ==
O. azurea lives in a variety of habitats, including desert, mountain grasslands, and slopes in the Big Bend region of Texas and in the states of Coahuila, Chihuahua, Durango, and Zacatecas in Mexico.
