= Opuntia pottsii =

Conservation status
- Least Concern (IUCN 3.1)

Scientific classification
- Kingdom: Plantae
- Clade: Embryophytes
- Clade: Tracheophytes
- Clade: Spermatophytes
- Clade: Angiosperms
- Clade: Eudicots
- Order: Caryophyllales
- Family: Cactaceae
- Genus: Opuntia
- Species: O. pottsii

Binomial name
- Opuntia pottsii Salm-Dyck

Synonyms
- Opuntia ballii Rose; Opuntia delicata Rose; Opuntia filipendula Engelm.; Opuntia macrorhiza subsp. pottsii (Salm-Dyck) U.Guzmán & Mandujano; Opuntia macrorhiza var. pottsii (Salm-Dyck) L.D.Benson; Opuntia pottsii var. montana (Engelm.) Bulot; Opuntia rafinesquei var. montana Engelm.; Opuntia setispina Engelm. ex Salm-Dyck; Opuntia tenuispina Engelm.

Species of plant

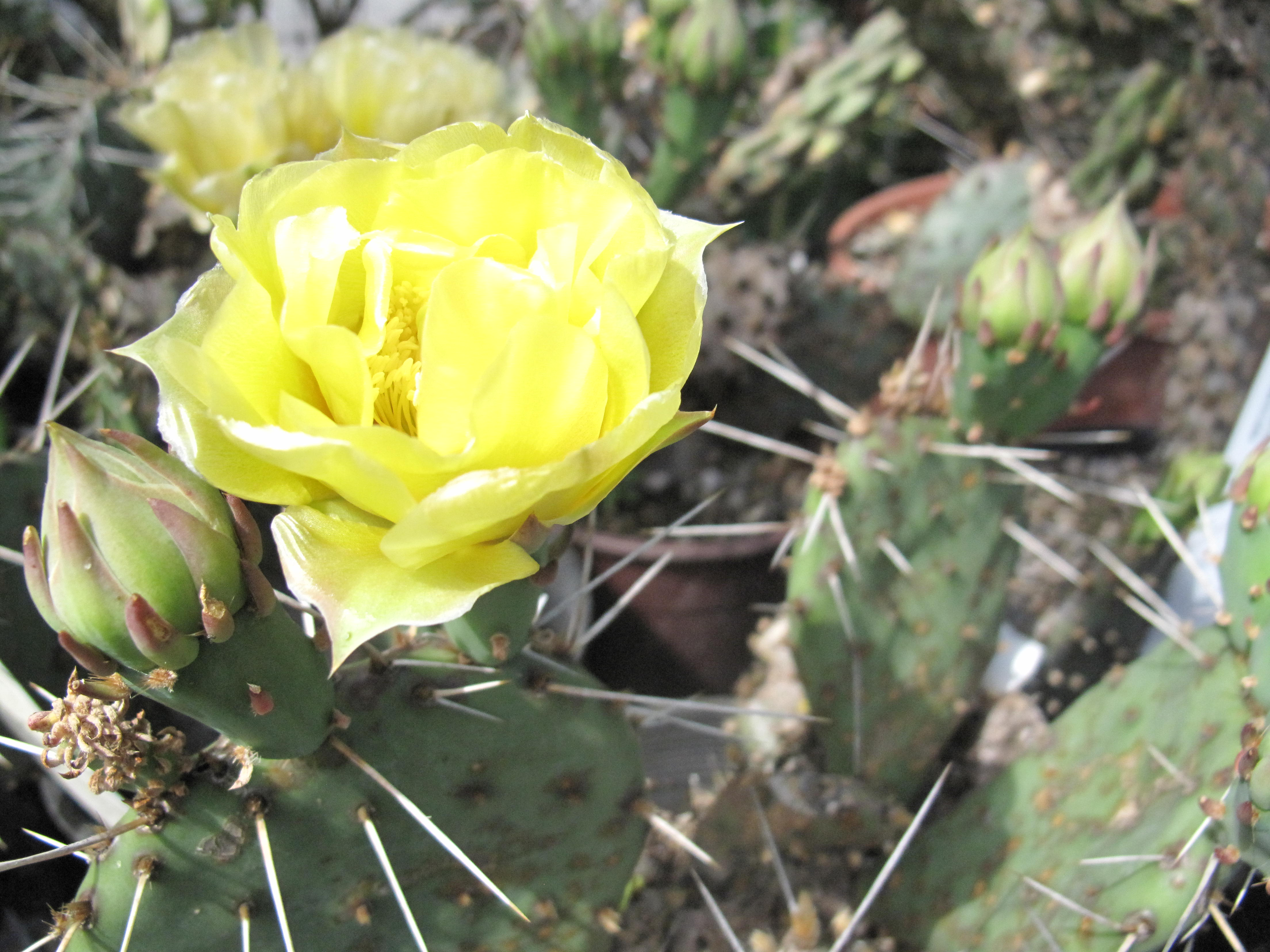
Opuntia potsii

Opuntia pottsii is a species of flowering plant in the family Cactaceae, native to southeastern Arizona, New Mexico, and western Texas in the United States and to northeast Mexico. It was first described by Joseph zu Salm-Reifferscheidt-Dyck in 1850.
