= Opuntia mackensenii =

Scientific classification
- Kingdom: Plantae
- Clade: Tracheophytes
- Clade: Angiosperms
- Clade: Eudicots
- Order: Caryophyllales
- Family: Cactaceae
- Genus: Opuntia
- Species: O. mackensenii

Binomial name
- Opuntia mackensenii Rose

Synonyms
- Opuntia edwardsii V.E.Grant & K.A.Grant

Species of cactus

Opuntia mackensenii is a species of flowering plant in the family Cactaceae, native to west Texas. It was first described by Joseph Nelson Rose in 1911.
