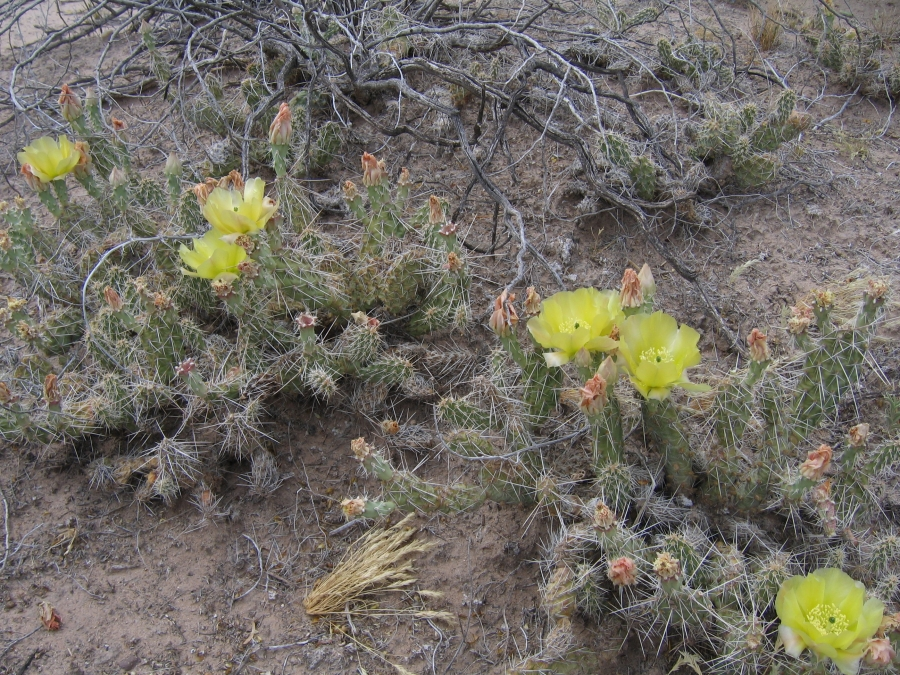

Scientific classification
- Kingdom: Plantae
- Clade: Tracheophytes
- Clade: Angiosperms
- Clade: Eudicots
- Order: Caryophyllales
- Family: Cactaceae
- Genus: Opuntia
- Species: O. arenaria

Binomial name
- Opuntia arenaria Engelmann

= Opuntia arenaria =

Species of cactus

Opuntia arenaria was considered a variety of O. polyacantha by many botanists, and is still treated that way in the Flora of North America. However, O. arenaria is diploid and O. polyacantha is tetraploid. It was described by Engelmann in 1856.

== Description ==
Opuntia arenaria can grow in soil that is essentially pure sand. It has rhizomes up to 1.5 m long that give rise to above ground shoots with small cladodes that are 4-7 x 2–3 cm in size. Major spines are found in the distal areoles and are often reflexed, up to 30 mm long. Minor spines are strongly deflexed and much shorter. Overall, plants (clumps) of cladodes may be 20–30 cm across and about 4–8 cm tall. Fruits are small, about 2.5 cm.
