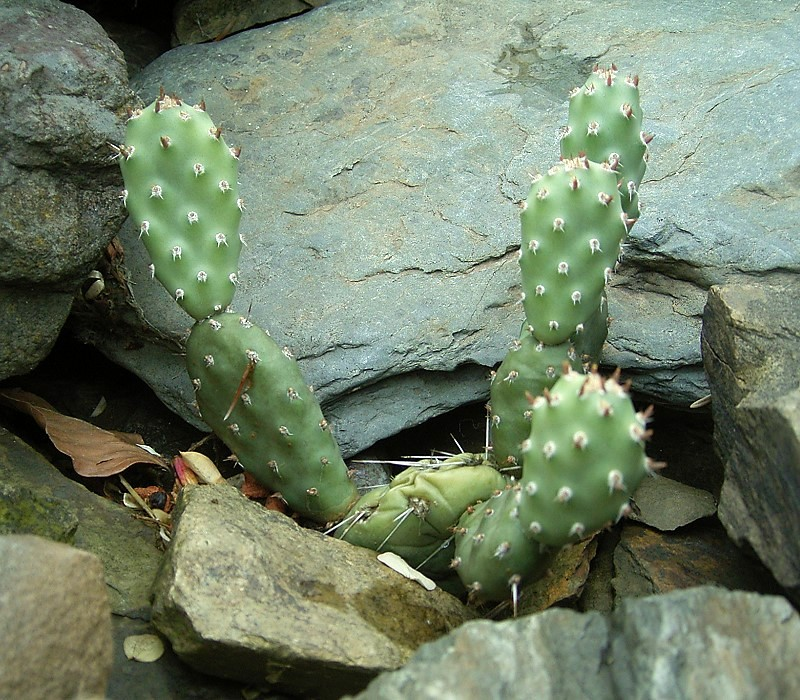

Conservation status
- Least Concern (IUCN 3.1)

Scientific classification
- Kingdom: Plantae
- Clade: Tracheophytes
- Clade: Angiosperms
- Clade: Eudicots
- Order: Caryophyllales
- Family: Cactaceae
- Genus: Opuntia
- Species: O. pinkavae

Binomial name
- Opuntia pinkavae Parfitt

= Opuntia pinkavae =

Species of cactus

Opuntia pinkavae, common names Bulrush Canyon prickly-pear or Pinkava's pricklypear, is a species of cactus known only from northern Arizona and southern Utah. It was named for Dr. Donald Pinkava, professor emeritus at Arizona State University in Tempe

== Description ==
The species is rarely more than 25 cm (10 inches) tall. Stems are green, flattened, up to 15 cm (6 inches) long. Flowers are magenta with yellow to magenta anthers and white styles. Fruits are tan, up to 3 cm (1.2 inches) long, dry when ripe.

== Habitat ==
It grows in sunny locations in grasslands, on the edges of pinyon-juniper woodlands, on sandy or limestone soils.

== Taxonomy ==
There is confusion concerning the correct scientific name. Specimens of O. pinkavae were distributed for years labeled as "Opuntia kaibabensis", a name that was never validly published. Parfitt's original description coining the name Opuntia pinkavae and the treatment attributed to Pinkava in Flora of North America suggest that the name was offered as a replacement for another allegedly unpublished name, Opuntia basilaris var. woodburyi. However, the varietal name was indeed validly published, but chromosomal comparisons between it and O. pinkavae show that they are not the same taxon. Opuntia pinkavae remains an accepted name with no synonyms.
