= Opuntia zacuapanensis =

Scientific classification
- Kingdom: Plantae
- Clade: Tracheophytes
- Clade: Angiosperms
- Clade: Eudicots
- Order: Caryophyllales
- Family: Cactaceae
- Subfamily: Opuntioideae
- Tribe: Opuntieae
- Genus: Opuntia
- Species: O. zacuapanensis

Binomial name
- Opuntia zacuapanensis A.Berger

Species of prickly pear cactus

Opuntia zacuapanensis, commonly known as the Zacuapan prickly pear, is a species of prickly pear cactus in the family Cactaceae. It was described by Alwin Berger in 1912.

== Distribution and habitat ==
Its range spreads throughout parts of Veracruz, Mexico, where it grows in the seasonally dry tropical zone.
