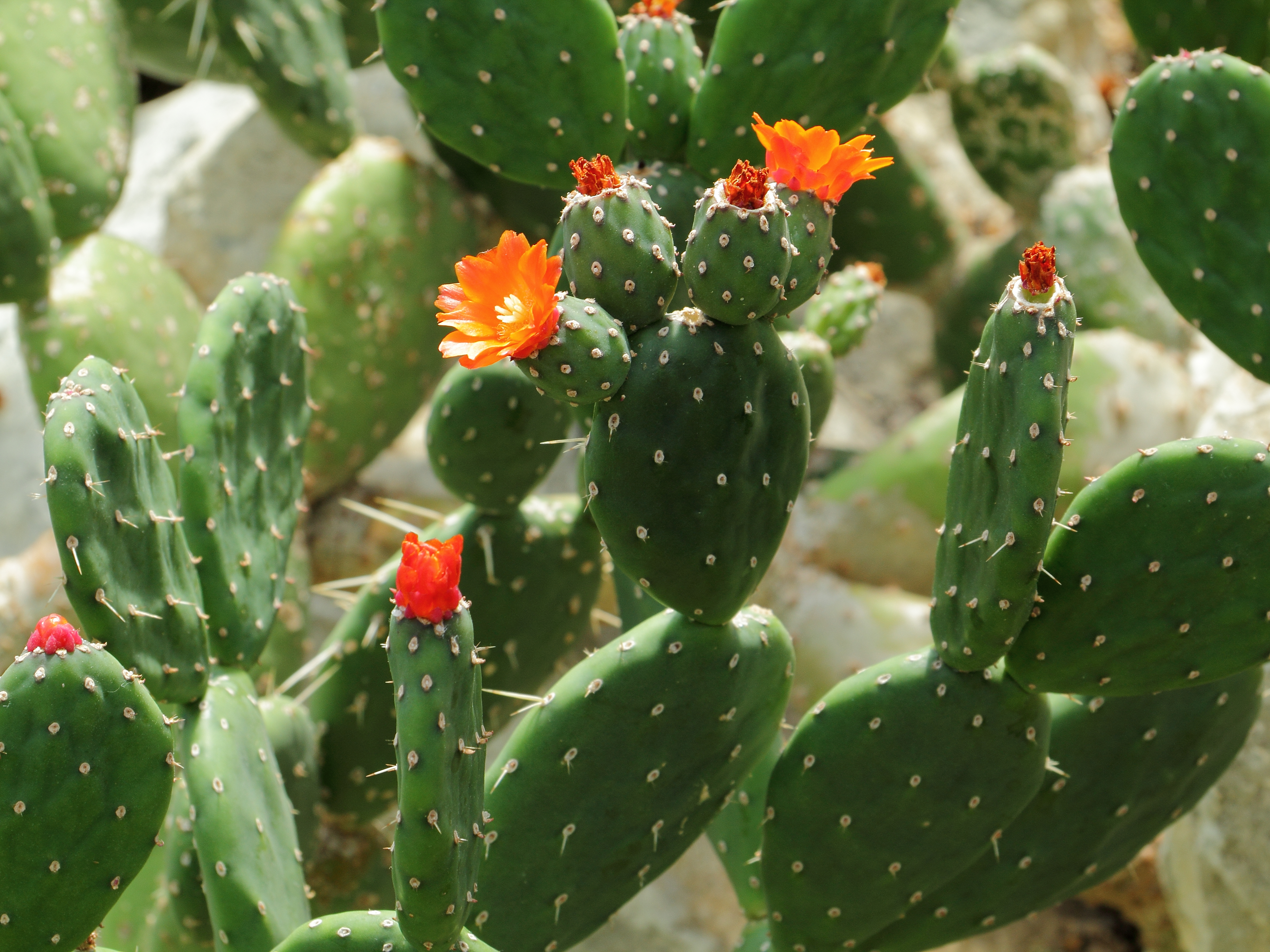

Conservation status
- Least Concern (IUCN 3.1)

Scientific classification
- Kingdom: Plantae
- Clade: Tracheophytes
- Clade: Angiosperms
- Clade: Eudicots
- Order: Caryophyllales
- Family: Cactaceae
- Genus: Opuntia
- Species: O. quitensis

Binomial name
- Opuntia quitensis F.A.C.Weber

= Opuntia quitensis =

Species of cactus

Opuntia quitensis is a species of cactus found in Peru and Ecuador.

== Description ==
The plant extends with small stems, forming a large shrub with a size of 0.4 to 3 meters high. The pads are flattened, elongated and almost circular, bare and well connected. They are 6 to 40 cm long and 5 to 13 cm wide.

From the areoles emerging brown glochids, 2 to 4 millimeters long, with 2 to 7 spines that are sometimes missing, like needles and on the top a few beards. They are yellowish white, flattened at the top of 0.5 to 8 centimeters. The unisex flowers are orange-red to yellow-orange, 2.3-7 centimeters long and have diameters of 1-2.5 centimeters. The fruits are barrel-shaped, brown-green in color and are ripen reddish, 2.5 to 4 cm long and 2 to 4 cm in diameter. They are adorned with glochids and sometimes thorns or bristles.
