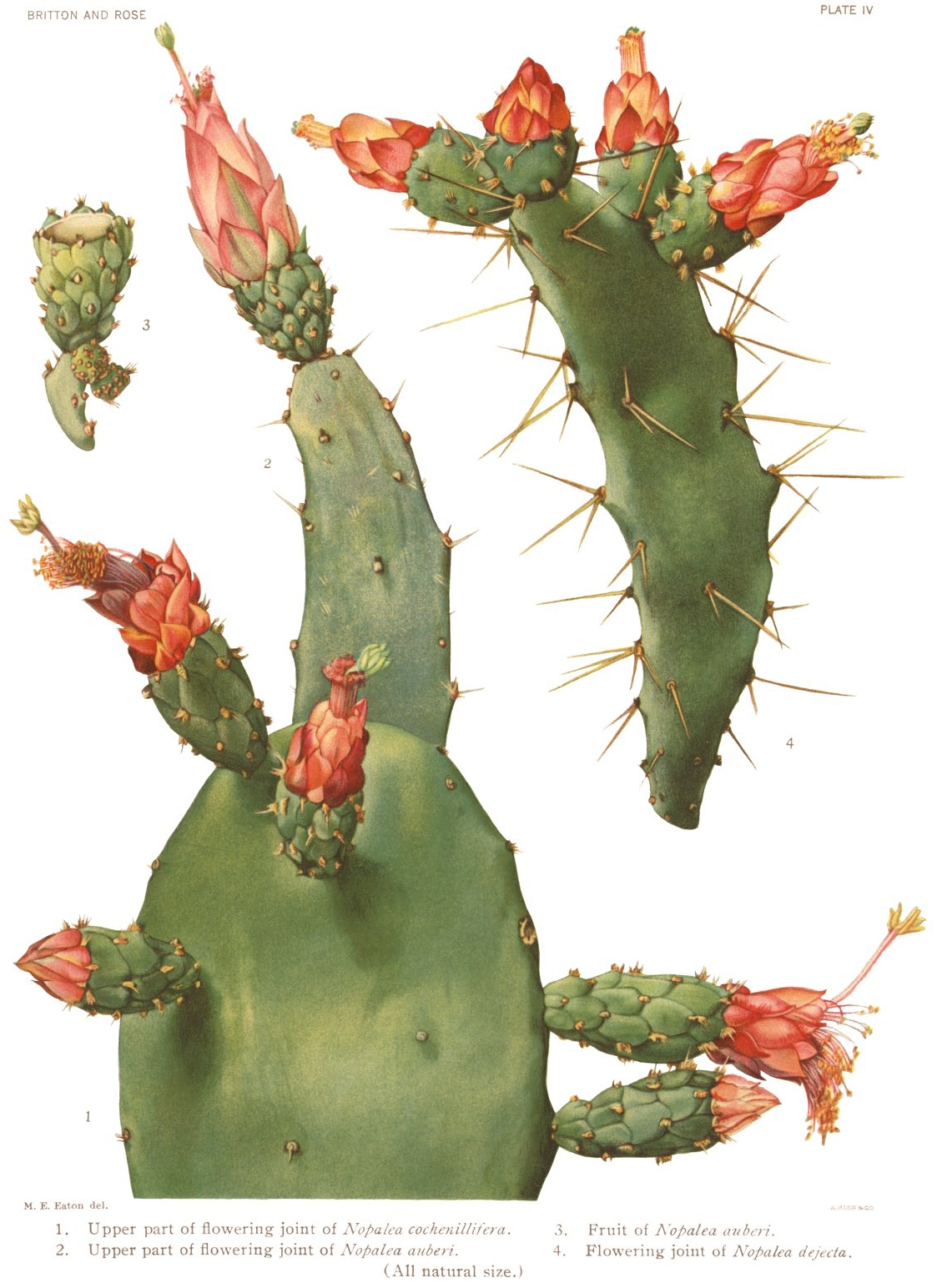

Scientific classification
- Kingdom: Plantae
- Clade: Tracheophytes
- Clade: Angiosperms
- Clade: Eudicots
- Order: Caryophyllales
- Family: Cactaceae
- Genus: Opuntia
- Species: O. auberi

Binomial name
- Opuntia auberi Pfeiff., 1840

= Opuntia auberi =

Species of cactus

Opuntia auberi is a flower plant species belonging to the family Cactaceae. It is native to Central America in Cuba and the Antilles.

== Description ==
Opuntia auberi grows in the form of a tree and reaches a height of 3 to 8 meters or more. The branches occur at right angles from the trunk. The stem is cylindrical and has a brown color with glochidia. It is blue-green to gray-green, with large pieces up to 30 centimeters long. The flowers are pink and measure up to 9 cm long.

== Taxonomy ==
Opuntia auberi was described by Ludwig Karl Georg Pfeiffer and published in Allgemeine Gartenzeitung in 1840.

== Etymology ==
Opuntia : generic name that comes from the Greek used by Pliny the Elder for a plant that grew around the city of Opus in Greece.

auberi : epithet awarded in honor of the director of the Botanical Garden of Havana Pedro A. Auber.

Synonyms

Nopalea auberi

== Gallery ==
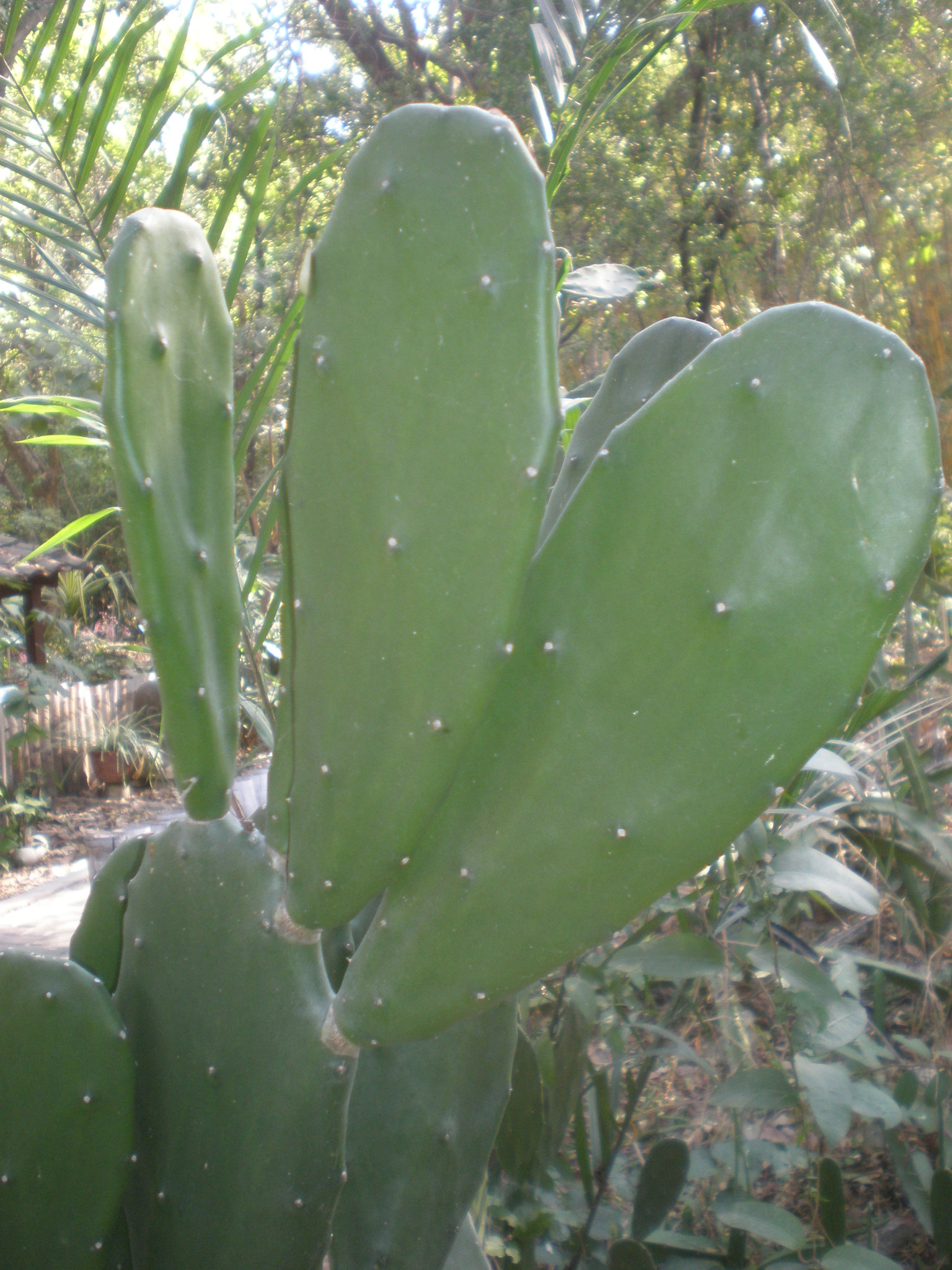

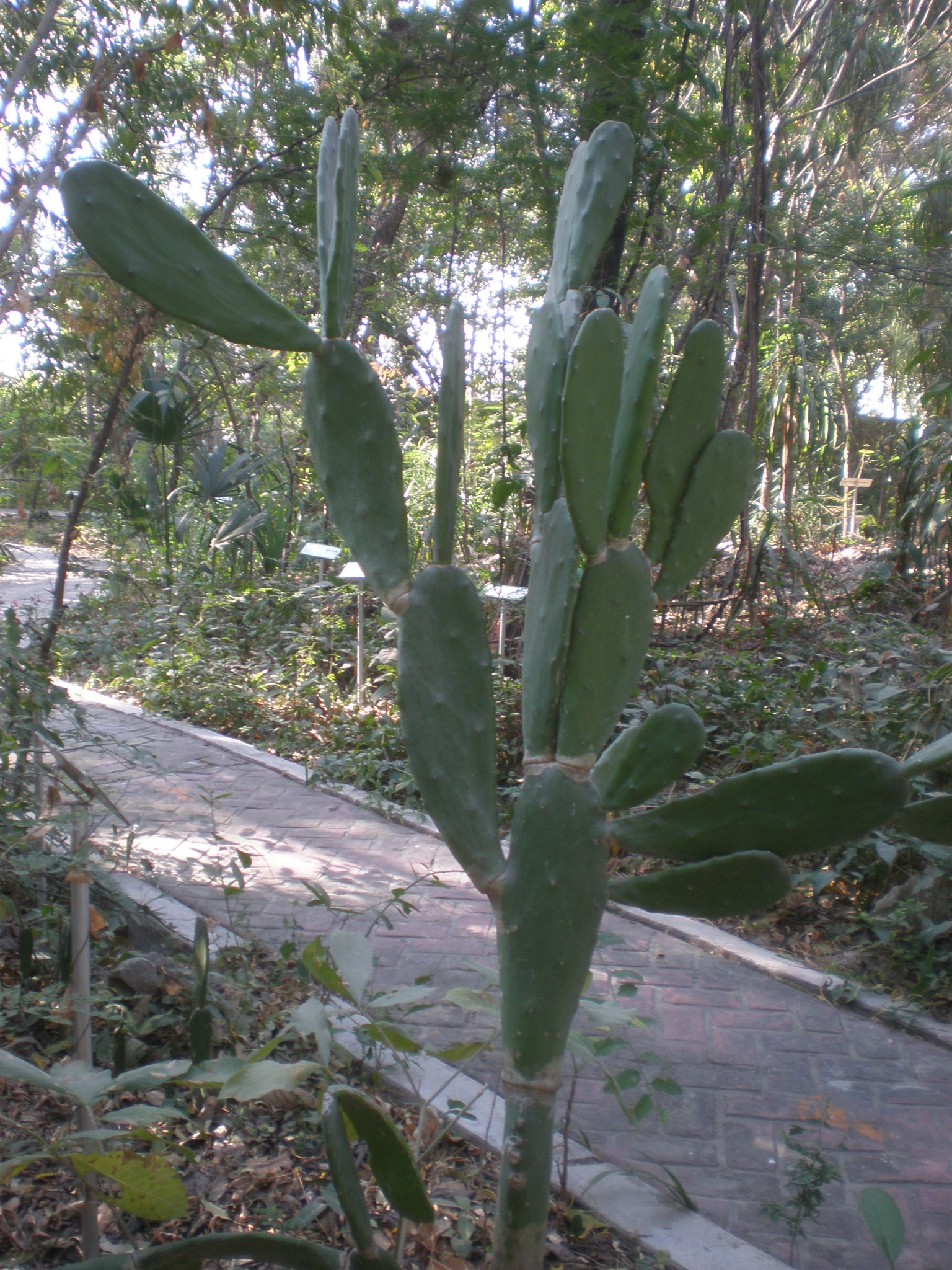

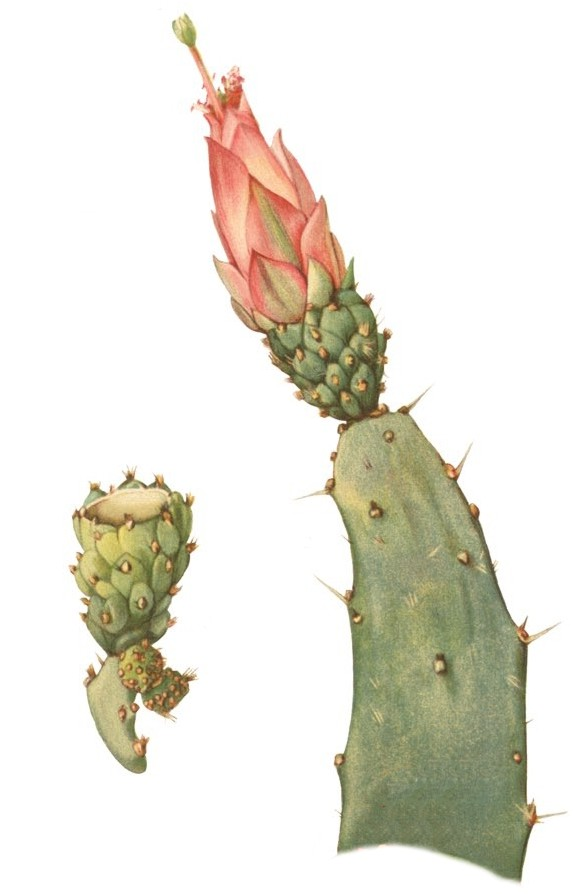
