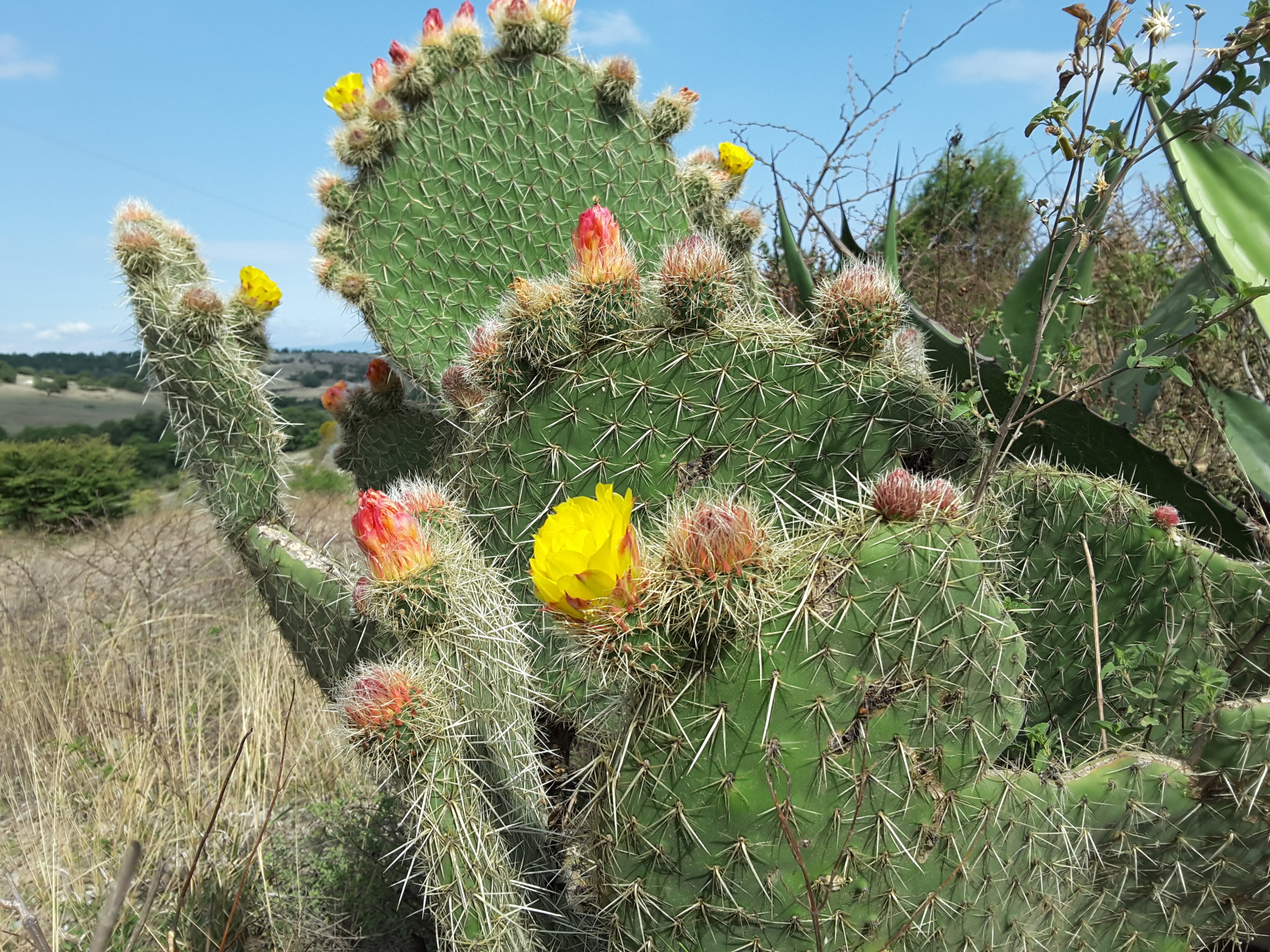
- Flowering individual

Conservation status
- Least Concern (IUCN 3.1)

Scientific classification
- Kingdom: Plantae
- Clade: Tracheophytes
- Clade: Angiosperms
- Clade: Eudicots
- Order: Caryophyllales
- Family: Cactaceae
- Subfamily: Opuntioideae
- Tribe: Opuntieae
- Genus: Opuntia
- Species: O. huajuapensis

Binomial name
- Opuntia huajuapensis Bravo
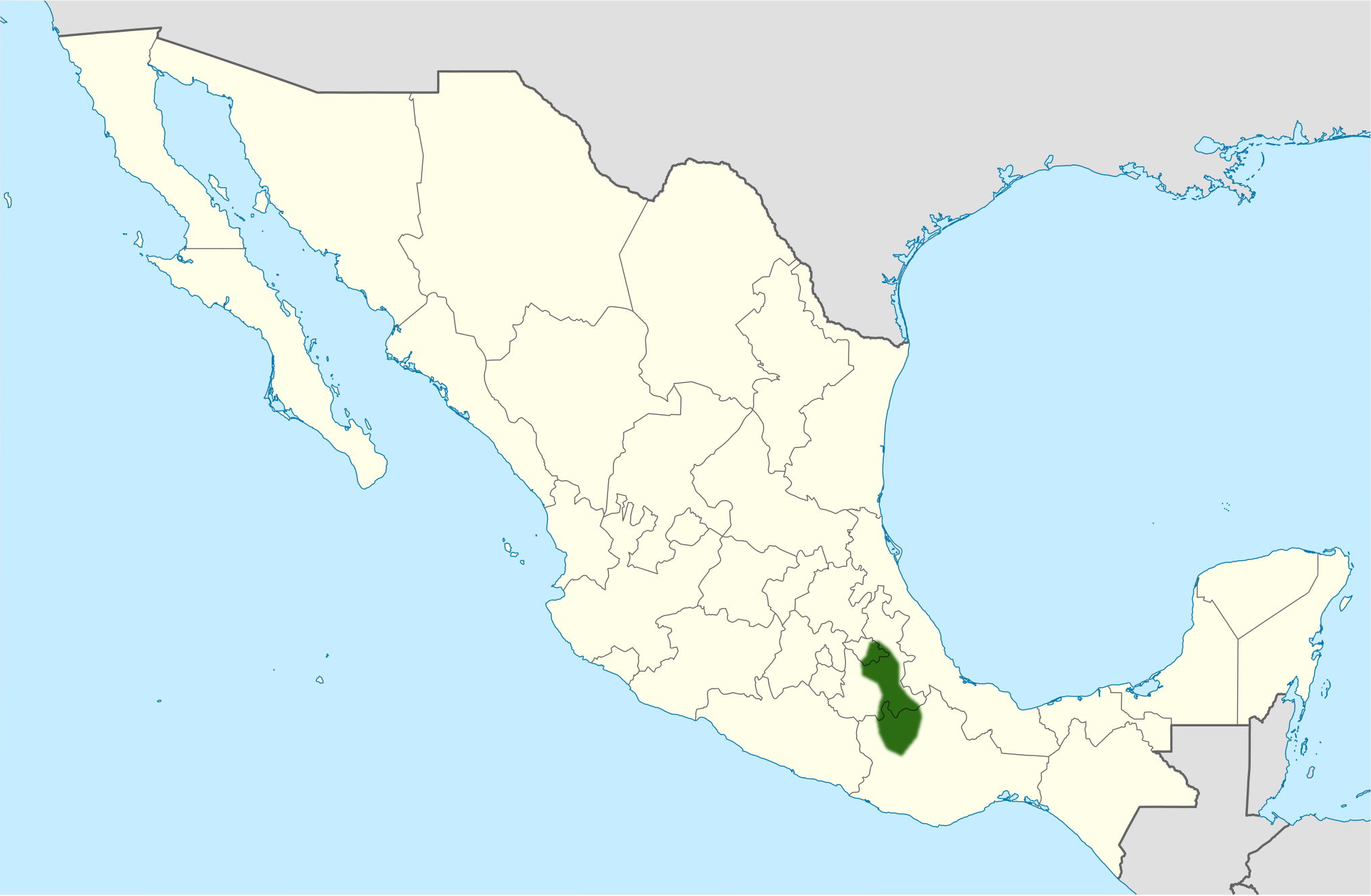
- Distribution

= Opuntia huajuapensis =

Species of prickly pear cactus

Opuntia huajuapensis, commonly known as the Huajuapan prickly pear or the Chumbera, is a species of prickly pear cactus in the family Cactaceae. It was described by Helia Bravo Hollis in 1953, and named for the town of Heroica Ciudad Huajuapan de León in Oaxaca, Mexico, from which the first specimens were described.

== Description ==
Opuntia huajuapensis is a shrubby cactus species, being more wide than tall, with sparsely armed stems, and yellow flowers. It has larger-sized spines, that cover most of the cacti's pads. The fruit produced by the species is sweet tasting, with a yellow-green inside.

== Distribution and habitat ==
Opuntia huajuapensis is native to parts of Oaxaca, Puebla, and Tlaxcala in Mexico, where the species grows at elevations of 2,000–2,700 m (7,000–9,000 ft). It primarily grows in Pre-cordilleran steppes and Oak-savannah.

== Conservation ==
Opuntia huajuapensis is currently listed as least concern by the IUCN Red List, for there are not many severe threats to its natural range.

== Uses ==
Opuntia huajuapensis has no currently listed uses, but has been introduced to parts of Spain, where it grows as an ornamental cactus. It is on the list of "Alien invasive species" in Europe, and could pose a threat to local agriculture and tourism.
