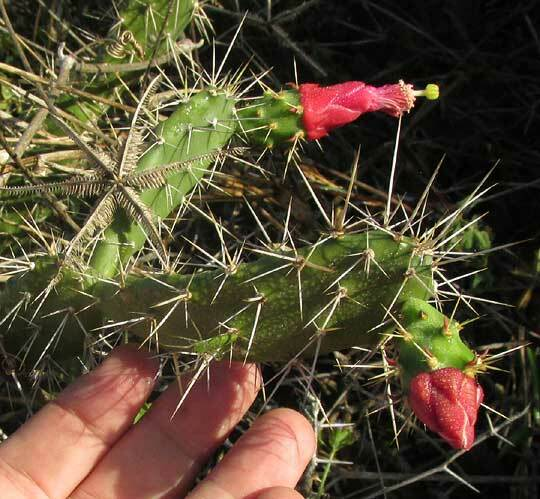

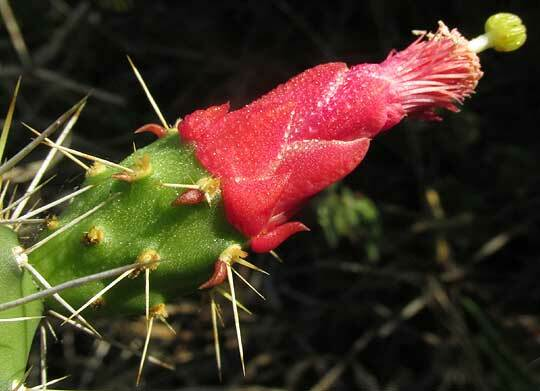

Scientific classification
- Kingdom: Plantae
- Clade: Tracheophytes
- Clade: Angiosperms
- Clade: Eudicots
- Order: Caryophyllales
- Family: Cactaceae
- Genus: Opuntia
- Species: O. inaperta

Binomial name
- Opuntia inaperta (Schott ex Griffiths) D.R.Hunt

Synonyms
- Nopalea inaperta Schott ex Griffiths (1913); Nopalea gaumeri Britton & Rose (1919); Opuntia gaumeri (Britton & Rose) R.Puente & Majure (2014)

= Opuntia inaperta =

Species of flowering plant

Opuntia inaperta is a species of prickly pear in the cactus family, the Cactaceae.

== Description ==
The species grows up to 7 meters tall (23 feet). Its branches often extend widely through the scrub in which normally it occurs. Individual stem segments, the pads, are up to 17 cm (6.7 in) long, flattened and slenderly oblong. Scattered across the pads' flat surfaces are spine-bearing locations known as areoles from which 3 or more spines arise in each areole. The spines reach about 4cm long (~1½ inches). Flowers are yellow to rose colored and about 4cm long. Mature fruits are red and reach 1.5cm long (~0.6 inch).

== Habitat ==
Opuntia inaperta occurs in the Mexican Dry Broadleaf Forest Biome. This biome is distinguished by warm to hot weather all year, and a long dry season. More specifically, it inhabits the ecoregion known as the Yucatán dry forest. The most species-rich dry forests in the world occur in southern Mexico and in the Bolivian lowlands.

== Distribution ==
Opuntia inaperta occurs in Guatemala and, in southern Mexico, the states of Campeche, Chiapas, Quintana Roo, Tabasco Veracruz and Yucatán.

== Conservation status ==
No major conservation organizations such as the IUCN have designated a conservation status for Opuntia inaperta. However, the Yucatan's CICY, the Centro de Investigación Científica de Yucatán, or Yucatan's Center for Scientific Investigation, considers the species in need of attention. That makes sense because dry forests are particularly vulnerable to excessive burning, deforestation and overgrazing.

== Etymology ==
The genus name Opuntia predates Linnaeus and traditionally is explained as the Latin word Opuntia, meaning a pant from the Greek city of Opus. However, all cactus species are native only to the Americas, except for Rhipsalis baccifera which doesn't look like an Opuntia. It's assumed that the plant from Opus was somehow similar to an Opuntia pricklypear.

In the species name inaperta, the in- is derived from the Latin im or in, meaning "in, into" or "ante". The -aperta is from the Latin peratum, for describing something which is closed or not open, as with flowers which remain closed or appear to remain closed all the time.
