= Opuntia tunoidea =

Scientific classification
- Kingdom: Plantae
- Clade: Embryophytes
- Clade: Tracheophytes
- Clade: Spermatophytes
- Clade: Angiosperms
- Clade: Eudicots
- Order: Caryophyllales
- Family: Cactaceae
- Genus: Opuntia
- Species: O. tunoidea

Binomial name
- Opuntia tunoidea Gibbes

Species of cactus

Opuntia tunoidea is a species of prickly pear cactus that is native to just South Carolina in the eastern United States.

== Description ==
Opuntia tunoidea is an erect succulent that can grow to as much as 2 meters (6.6 ft) in height. Its branches are widely spaced with an open structure. The large flat pads are spoon-shaped, tear-drop shaped, oval, or elliptic and are generally 10 to 30 centimeters (3.9–11.8 in) long. They are bright green in color and covered in natural waxes.

The pads are covered in spines that emerge from areole, raised areas, that are evenly spaced and more numerous along the edges of the pads than on the flat faces. The spines are often in groups of two to four, but can also be solitary or in larger numbers. They are a dull yellow color when dry and 1–3 cm (0.5–1 in) long, and can be straight or curved.

The flowers are bright yellow and 6.5–8 cm (2.5–3 in) across. The outermost set of sepals is kidney-shaped. The fruit is 4.5–6 cm (2–2.5 in) long and purple.

== Taxonomy ==
Opuntia tunoidea was given its scientific name in 1858 by Lewis Reeve Gibbes. It is classified in the genus Opuntia within the Cactaceae family and has no subspecies or botanical synonyms. Although it is listed as an accepted name by Plants of the World Online and World Plants, it is considered a synonym of Opuntia dillenii by the Natural Resources Conservation Service and is not described in the Flora of North America.
