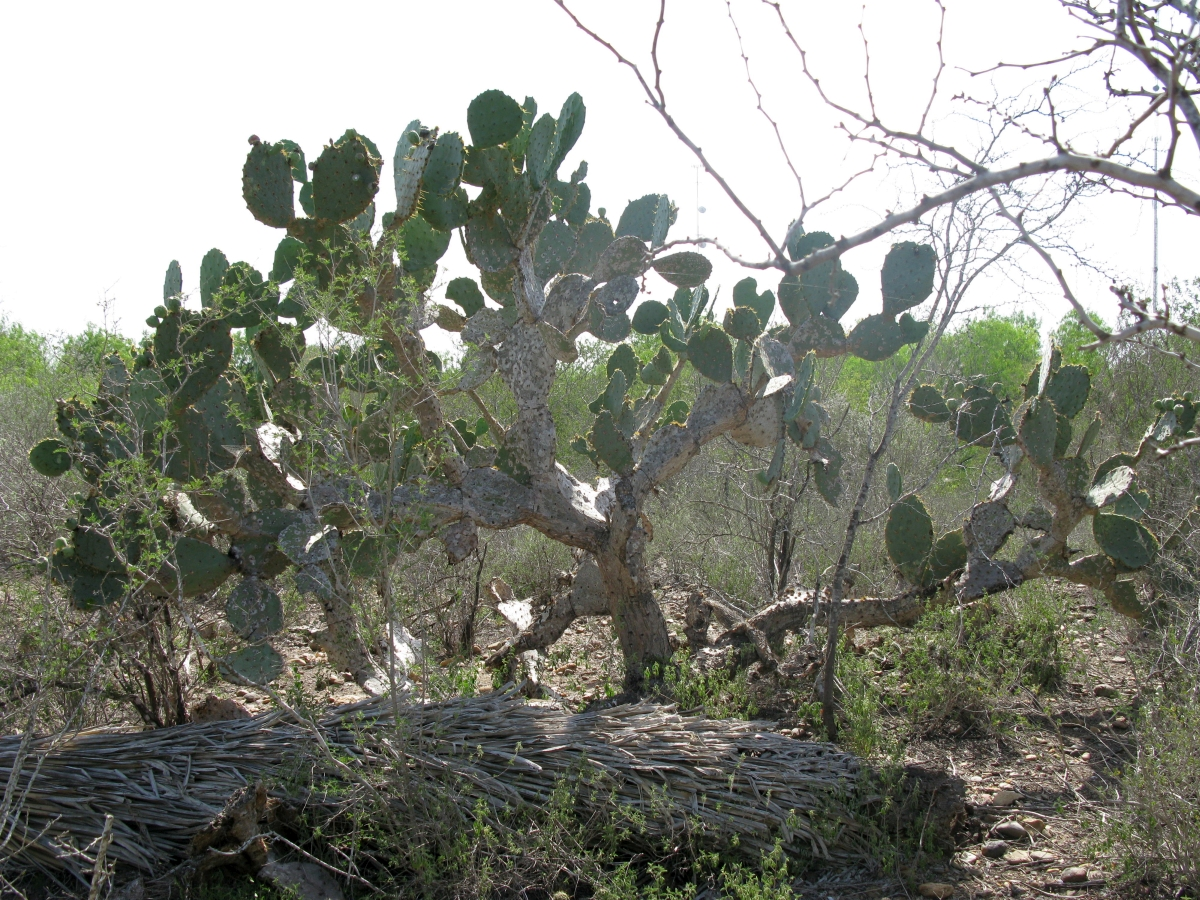

Scientific classification
- Kingdom: Plantae
- Clade: Tracheophytes
- Clade: Angiosperms
- Clade: Eudicots
- Order: Caryophyllales
- Family: Cactaceae
- Genus: Opuntia
- Species: O. × alta

Binomial name
- Opuntia × alta Griffiths (1910)

Synonyms
- Opuntia engelmannii var. alta (Griffiths) D.Weniger (1970)

= Opuntia × alta =

Species of cactus

Opuntia alta is a cactus species in the genus Opuntia. It is a large plant, with some older specimens forming trees to 4.6 metres (15 ft) tall. It is a naturally occurring hybrid of Opuntia engelmannii var. lindheimeri and O. stricta native to Texas and Louisiana.

== Identification ==
It resembles Opuntia lindheimeri, and immature specimens can be mistaken for that taxon. Mature O. alta plants form discrete trunks and have small fruits. Unlike O. lindheimeri, the flowers have pale stigmas.

Opuntia alta is probably closely related to Opuntia cacanapa, which grows further inland.

=== Gallery ===
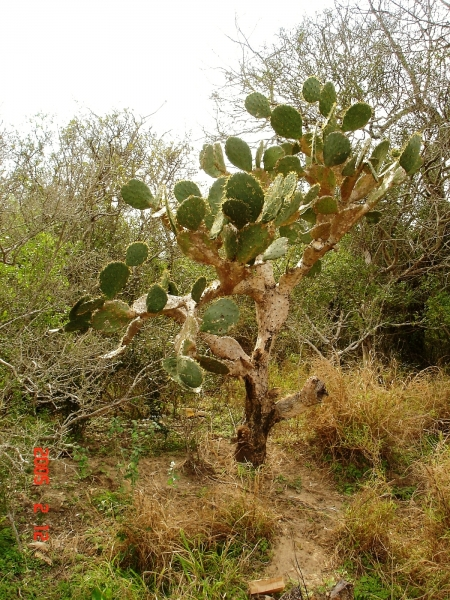
Opuntia alta, South Texas Plains

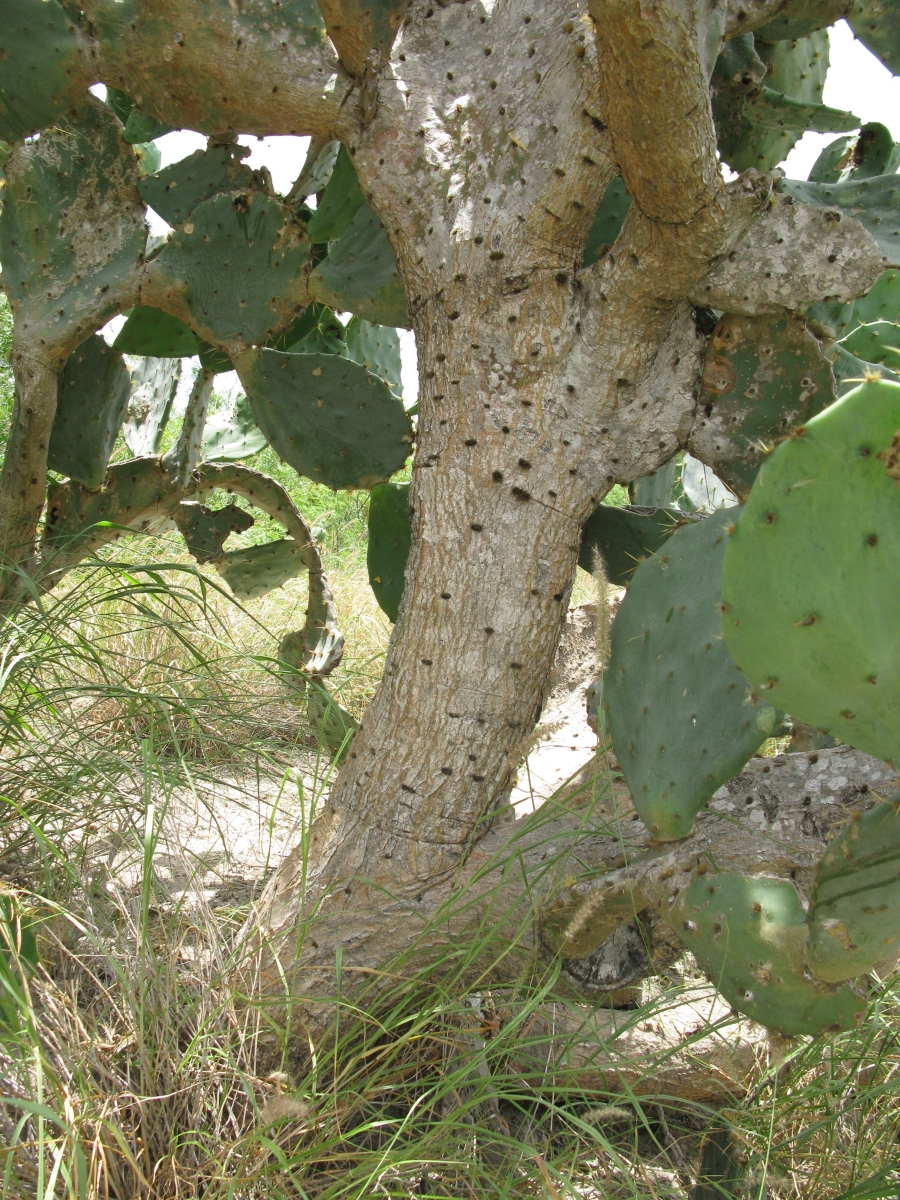
