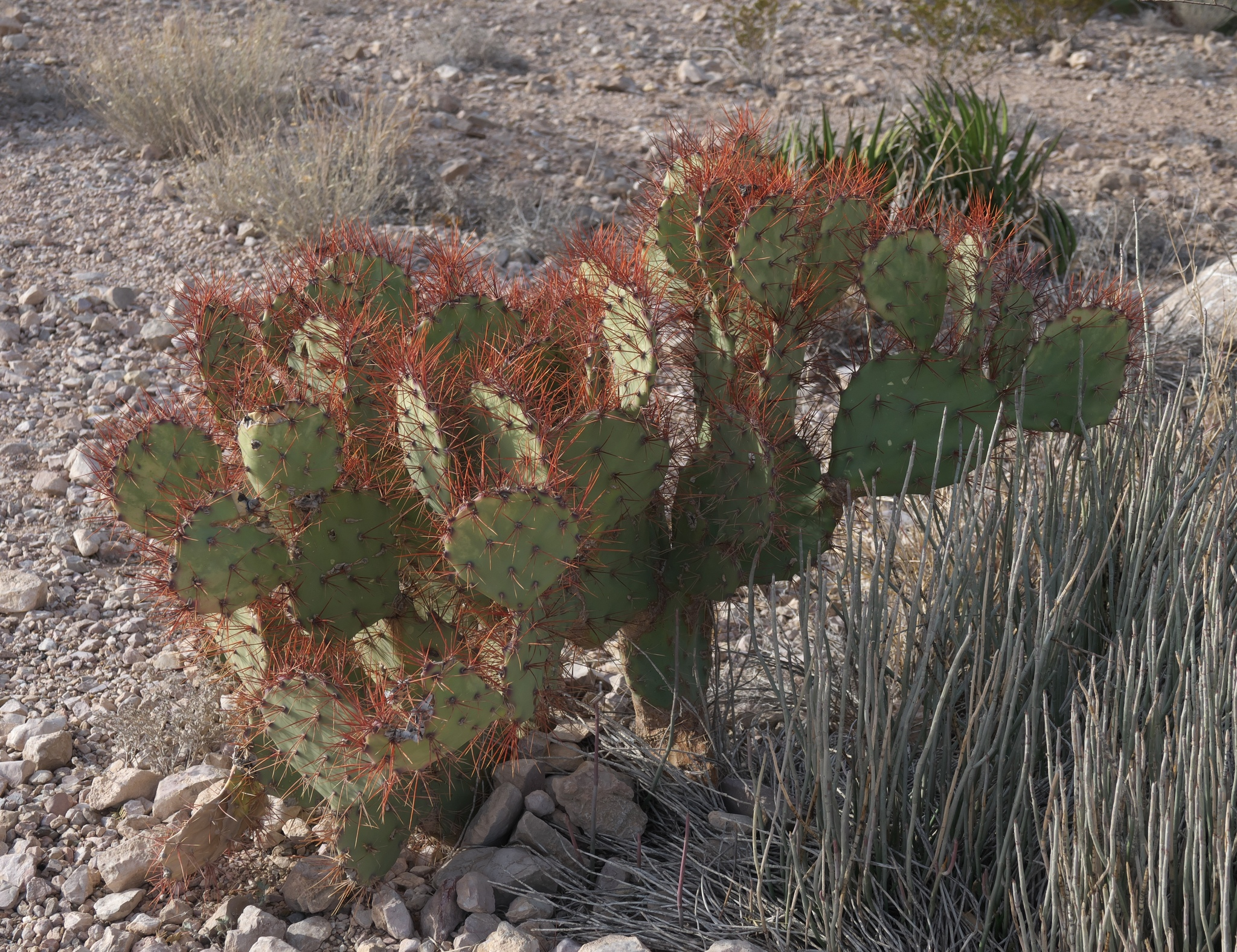
- Opuntia spinosibacca, Texas

Scientific classification
- Kingdom: Plantae
- Clade: Tracheophytes
- Clade: Angiosperms
- Clade: Eudicots
- Order: Caryophyllales
- Family: Cactaceae
- Subfamily: Opuntioideae
- Tribe: Opuntieae
- Genus: Opuntia
- Species: O. spinosibacca

Binomial name
- Opuntia spinosibacca Anthony

Synonyms
- Opuntia phaeacantha var. spinosibacca (Anthony) Benson

= Opuntia spinosibacca =

Species of cactus

Opuntia spinosibacca is a species of prickly pear cactus. It is found in southwestern Texas, especially in the area of Big Bend National Park, and in northeastern Mexico. It has translucent reddish central spines. Its flowers are usually yellow, often with reddish centers.

== Distribution and habitat ==
Opuntia spinosibacca grows primarily in the desert or dry shrubland. The cactus is abundant in the Boquillas Canyon area of Big Bend National Park, Texas.

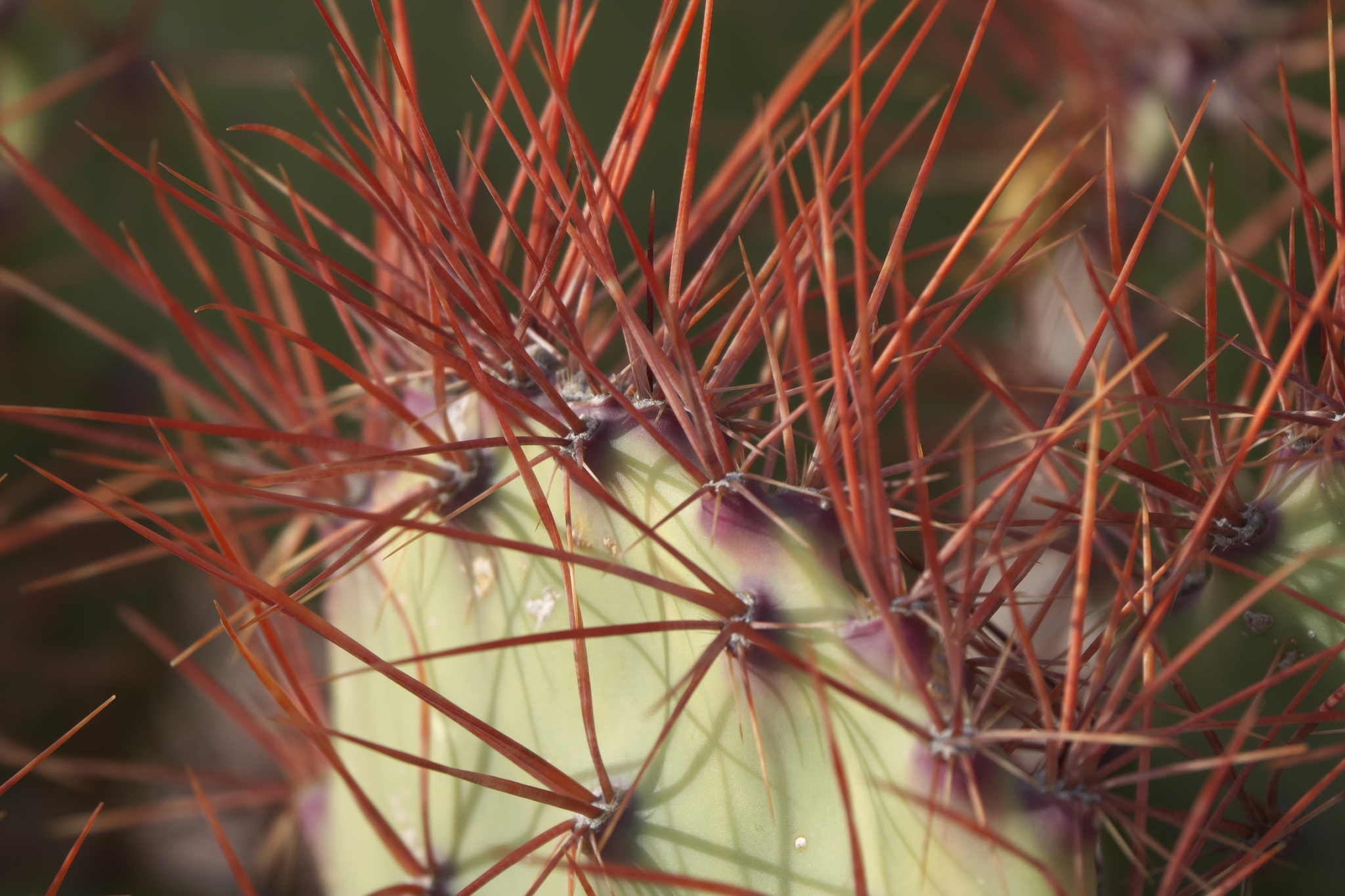
Opuntia spinosibacca, Texas
