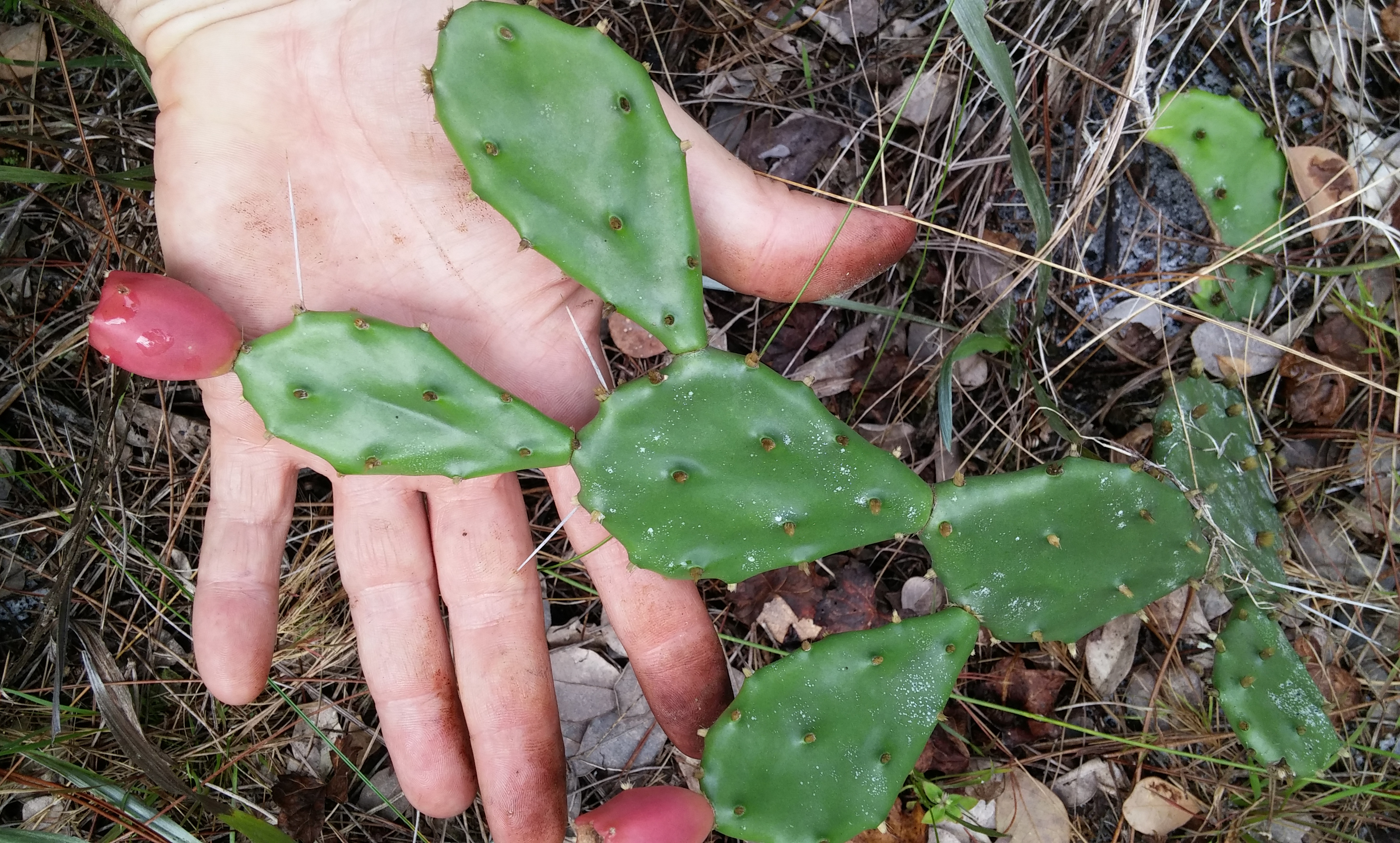
- Opuntia mesacantha subsp. lata
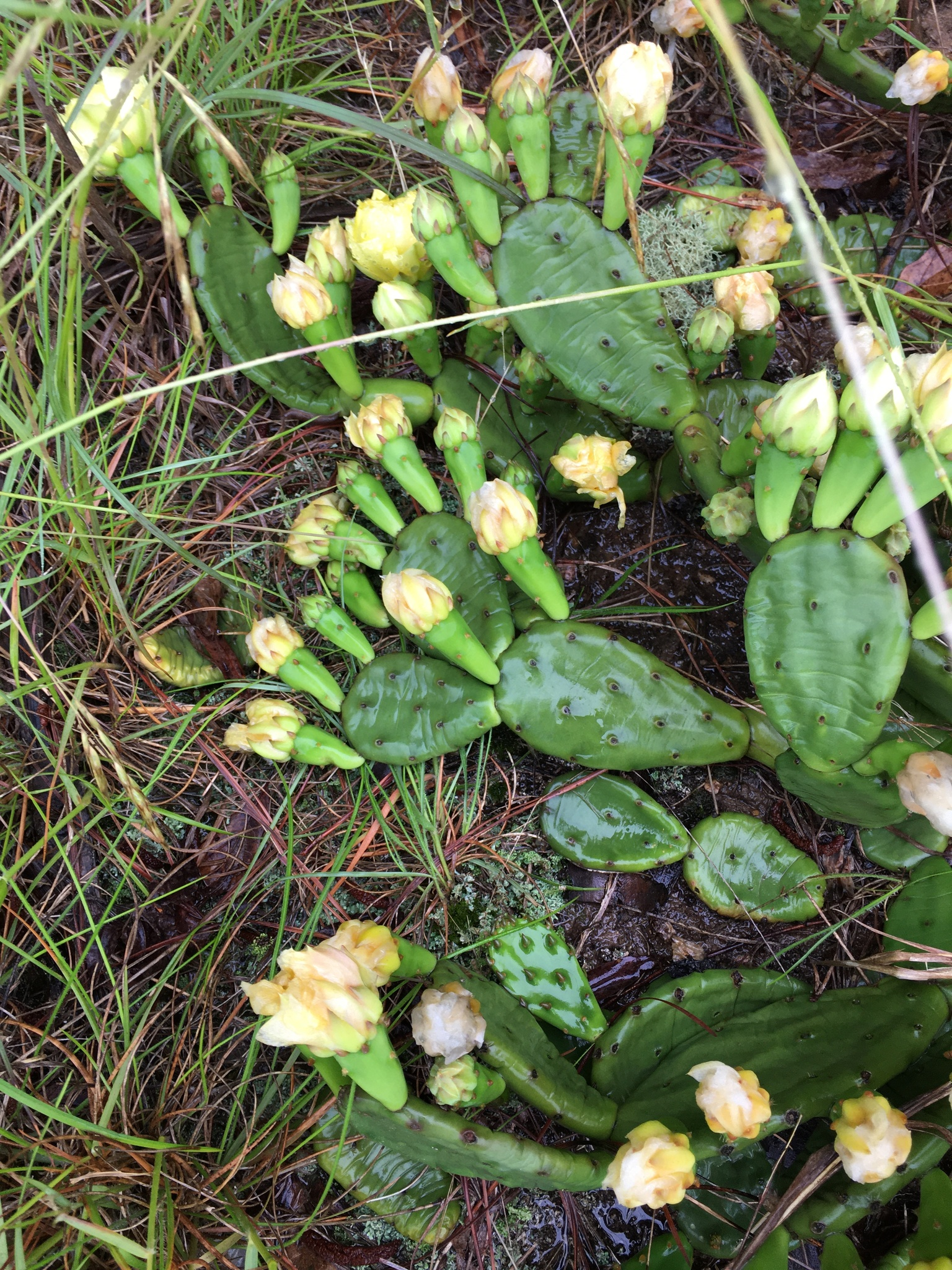
- Opuntia mesacantha subsp. mesacantha

Scientific classification
- Kingdom: Plantae
- Clade: Tracheophytes
- Clade: Angiosperms
- Clade: Eudicots
- Order: Caryophyllales
- Family: Cactaceae
- Genus: Opuntia
- Species: O. mesacantha

Binomial name
- Opuntia mesacantha Raf.

Synonyms
- List: Opuntia eburnispina Small ex Britton & Rose; Opuntia humifusa subsp. mesacantha (Raf.) Guiggi; Opuntia impedita Small ex Britton & Rose; Opuntia lata Small; Opuntia macrarthra Gibbes; Opuntia mesacantha var. oplocarpa J.M.Coult.; Opuntia mesacantha var. parva J.M.Coult.; Opuntia pollardii Britton & Rose; Opuntia rafinesquei f. oplocarpa (J.M.Coult.) Schelle; Opuntia youngii C.Z.Nelson

= Opuntia mesacantha =

Species of plant

Opuntia mesacantha, the longspine eastern prickly-pear or southeastern prickly-pear cactus, is a species of flowering plant in the family Cactaceae. It is native to New Jersey and the southeastern United States, and it has been introduced to Spain. It is found in a variety of sandy habitats, and on granite outcrops. Its fruit are edible.

== Subtaxa ==
The following subspecies are accepted:

- Opuntia mesacantha subsp. lata (Small) Majure – subtropical
- Opuntia mesacantha subsp. mesacantha – temperate
