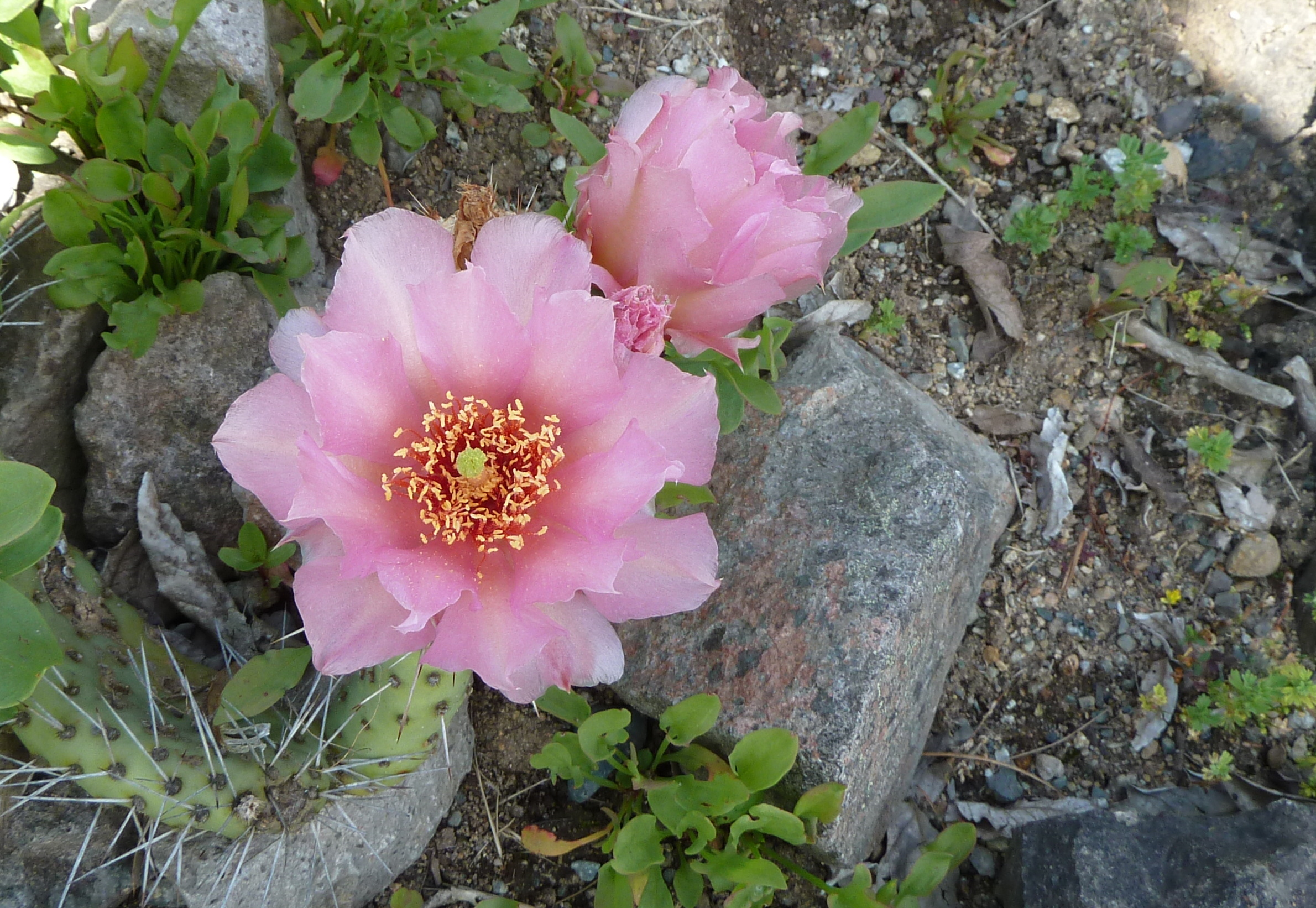

Conservation status
- Least Concern (IUCN 3.1)

Scientific classification
- Kingdom: Plantae
- Clade: Tracheophytes
- Clade: Angiosperms
- Clade: Eudicots
- Order: Caryophyllales
- Family: Cactaceae
- Genus: Opuntia
- Species: O. aurea

Binomial name
- Opuntia aurea E.M.Baxter

= Opuntia aurea =

Species of cactus

Opuntia aurea is a cactus that grows in Southern Utah and possibly Northern Arizona.

== Description ==
It is prostrate and forms irregularly sprawling plants to about three feet across. Cladodes grow up to 10 (sometimes 15) cm long. Occasionally a single pad may grow upright. Areoles are slightly sunken. The cactus can be spineless, have a few spines or have multiple spines. Spines may be in the distal areoles only.

Flowers may range from pale yellow to strong pink. The fruits typically bear no spines, but a few may appear at the apex. Seeds are circular with diameters around 7-8 mm.
