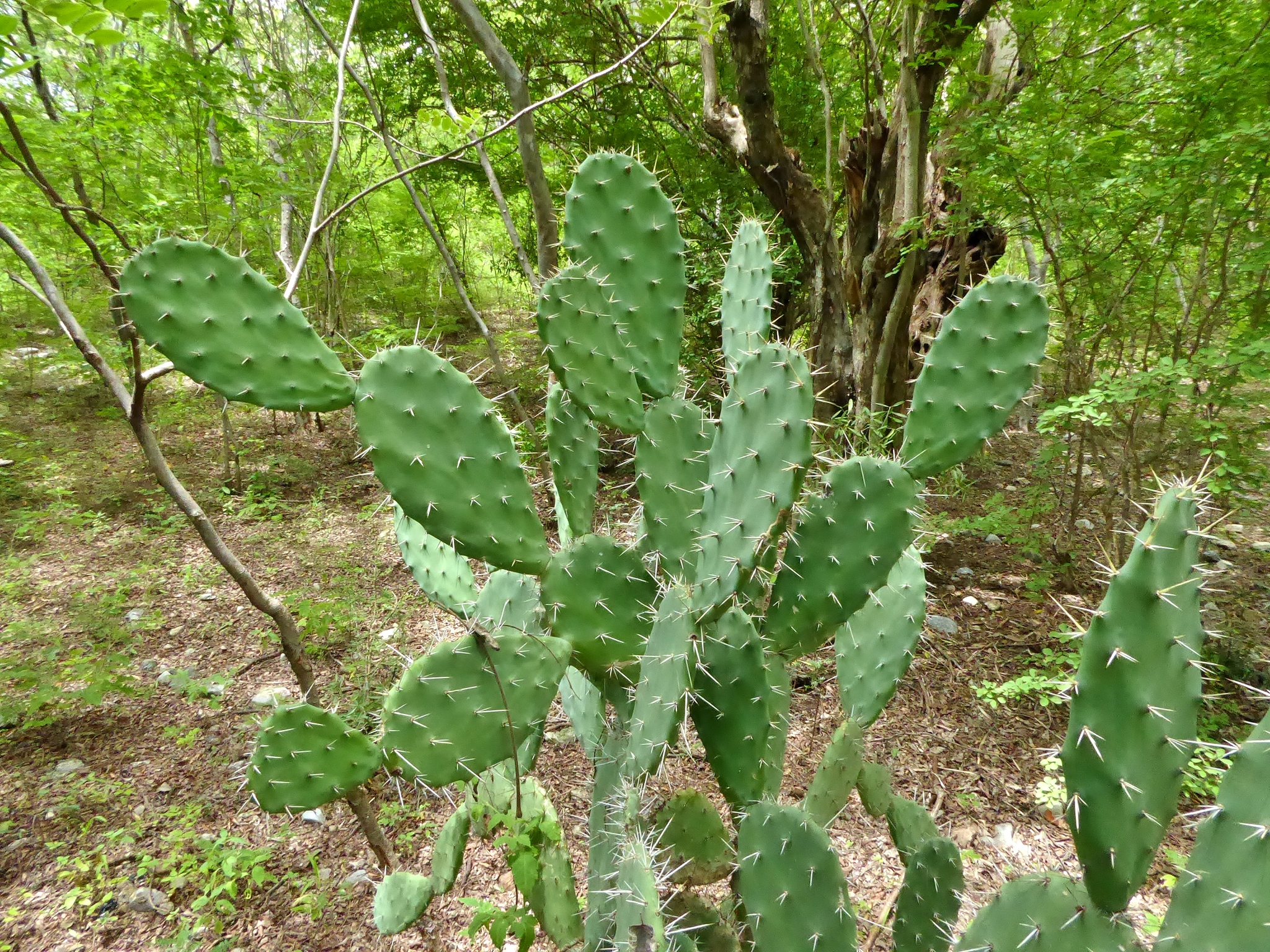

Conservation status
- Least Concern (IUCN 3.1)

Scientific classification
- Kingdom: Plantae
- Clade: Tracheophytes
- Clade: Angiosperms
- Clade: Eudicots
- Order: Caryophyllales
- Family: Cactaceae
- Genus: Opuntia
- Species: O. guatemalensis

Binomial name
- Opuntia guatemalensis Britton ex. Rose

= Opuntia guatemalensis =

Species of prickly pear cactus

Opuntia guatemalensis, commonly known as the Guatemalan prickly pear, is a species of prickly pear cactus in the family Cactaceae. It was described by Nathaniel Lord Britton and Joseph Nelson Rose, who had written multiple journals about the Cactaceae family throughout 1919–1923, in which the genus Opuntia was included.

== Description ==
Opuntia guatemalensis is a low growing, spreading prickly pear, with pads that are 10–20 cm (4-8 inches) long. Areoles are light brown, or slightly tan, and raised. Spines are white-gray, being darker at the tip, and are present over 2/3 to 3/4 of an average pad. Large spines are partially perpendicular to the pad. Flower blooms are a light yellow to potentially a darker red. The fruits are locally eaten.

== Distribution and habitat ==
Opuntia guatemalensis can be found in tropical, dry-temperate forests in Costa Rica, Guatemala, Honduras, and Nicaragua, with generally scattered individuals.

== Conservation ==
Opuntia guatemalensis is listed as least concern by the IUCN Red List, for there is no severe threats to its range. Forest fires may be a common threat though.
