= Opuntia tehuacana =

Conservation status
- Least Concern (IUCN 3.1)

Scientific classification
- Kingdom: Plantae
- Clade: Tracheophytes
- Clade: Angiosperms
- Clade: Eudicots
- Order: Caryophyllales
- Family: Cactaceae
- Subfamily: Opuntioideae
- Tribe: Opuntieae
- Genus: Opuntia
- Species: O. tehuacana

Binomial name
- Opuntia tehuacana S.Arias & U.Guzmán

Synonyms
- Opuntia olmeca Pérez Crisanto, J.Reyes & F.Brachet

Species of prickly pear cactus

Opuntia tehuacana, commonly known as the Tehuacán prickly pear, is a species of prickly pear cactus in the family Cactaceae. It was described by Mexican botanists Salvador Arias Montez and Susana Gama López in 1997. The species was named for the town of Tehuacán, Mexico, which is near the center of the species range.

== Description ==
Opuntia tehuacana on average reaches 0.40–1.50 m (1.31–4.92 feet) high, trunk 35 cm (13.77 inches) in diameter, and grey scaly bark, with profound yellow tones. Areoles are 0.2–0.5 cm (0.07–0.19 inches) long, with yellow glochids. Spines are curved, 1–5.8 cm (0.39–2.28 inches) long, and grey, sometimes yellow. Flowers are 6–7.2 cm (2.36–2.83 inches) long, usually yellow, but color can differ between red, yellow, and orange. Yellowish-green fruits, that are obovate. Medium-sized pads, with scattered spines.

== Distribution and habitat ==
Opuntia tehuacana is endemic to Mexico, specifically Puebla and Oaxaca, where it grows primarily in the dry shrub-land zone, but is also seen growing in the desert zone too. It has a solid range, with no known fragmented populations.

== Classification and conservation ==
The species merged with a similar taxon, Opuntia olmeca, which was thought to have been its own species until further research showed that they were the same genetic organism.

Opuntia tehuacana is currently listed as "Least Concern" by the IUCN Red List, for there are not many severe threats to its natural range.

== Uses ==
There are no current, common uses for Opuntia tehuacana, although it may be used locally as a vegetable in Mexican cuisine or as an ornamental cactus.
