= Opuntia preciadoae =

Scientific classification
- Kingdom: Plantae
- Clade: Tracheophytes
- Clade: Angiosperms
- Clade: Eudicots
- Order: Caryophyllales
- Family: Cactaceae
- Genus: Opuntia
- Species: O. preciadoae

Binomial name
- Opuntia preciadoae Scheinvar, Olalde, Gallegos & J.Morales

Species of plant

Opuntia preciadoae is a species of plant in the family Cactaceae, described by Scheinvar et al. in 2018. It is distributed in northern Mexico.

== Distribution ==
This species is distributed in northeastern and northwestern Mexico, including the states of Chihuahua, Sonora, Sinaloa, Durango and Tamaulipas, growing in coniferous and oak forests.

== Morphology ==
Plants low, shrubby, up to 1.4 m tall, with an open crown. Cladodes very large and thick, circular or broadly obovate, up to 50 cm in diameter, glaucous‑green, with some purple spots. Areoles arranged in 6–9 series, with greyish‑brown felt. Glochids in the upper part of the areole, yellow, deciduous. Spines (0–)1–6, 1.4–3 cm long, spreading, flattened, bent at the base, twisted. Flowers 4–6 cm long, clear yellowish‑red; stamens and style yellow, 5‑lobed stigma oblong, spreading, yellow. Fruits obovate to elliptical, 5 × 3 cm, purplish‑red, while still green with oblong podaria and prominent brown felt, with spines. Seeds lenticular, uniformly arillate.

=== Differences from similar species ===
This species is similar to Opuntia robusta subsp. robusta, but differs in the following characters:

- Distribution: O. preciadoae occurs in coniferous and oak forests of northern Mexico, while O. robusta subsp. robusta grows in xeric scrubs of central Mexico.
- Series of areoles: 6–9 in O. preciadoae vs. 9–11 in O. robusta subsp. robusta.
- Number and colour of spines: (0–)1–6 spines, 1.4–3 cm long, yellowish‑white to pale brown in O. preciadoae; 1–12 spines, 2–5 cm long, yellow to blackish in the latter.
- Flowers and fruits: flowers 4–6 cm long, fruit obovate, seeds lenticular in O. preciadoae; flowers 7–8 cm long, fruit globose, seeds deltoid in O. robusta subsp. robusta.

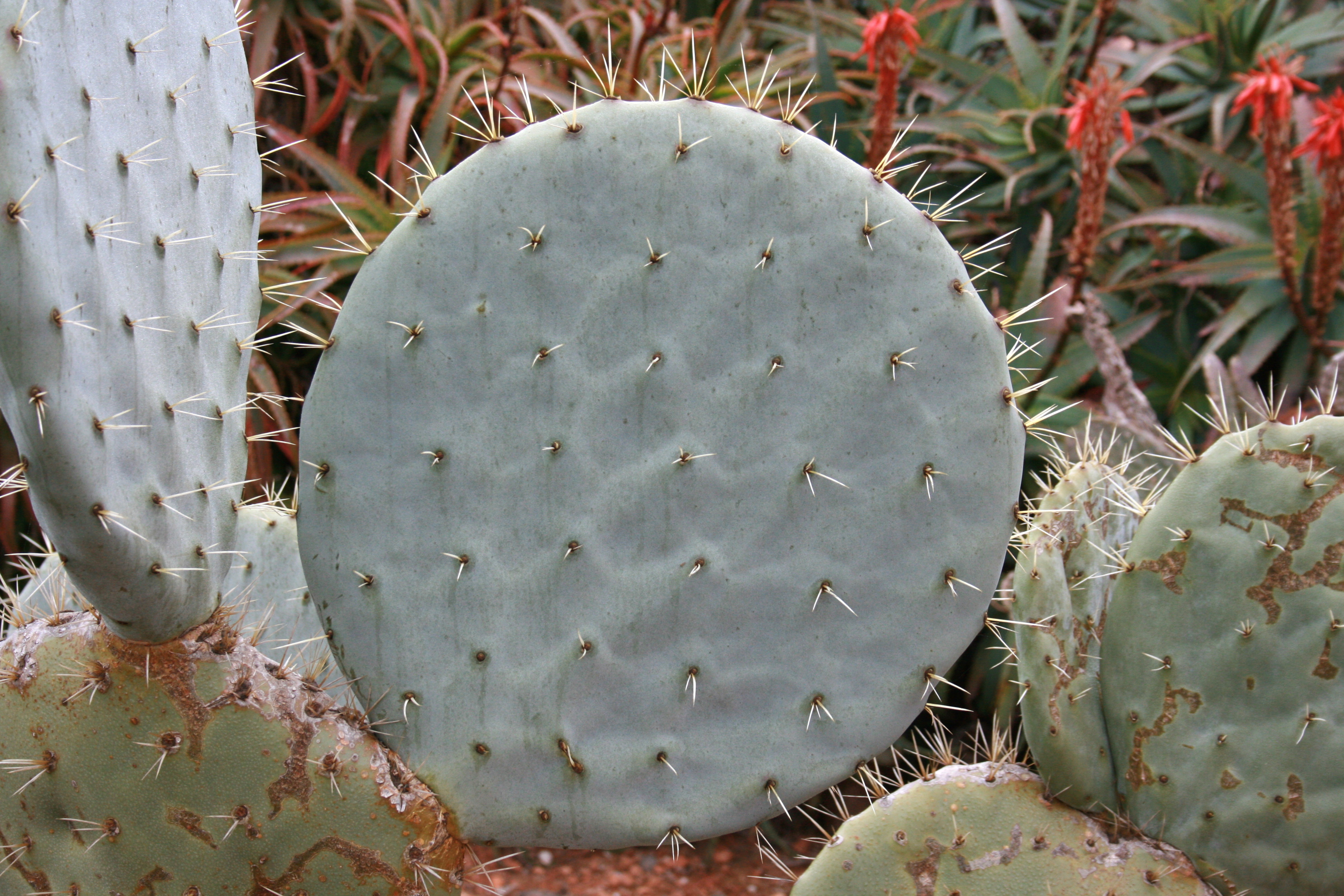
Opuntia robusta

== Uses ==
The local Rarámuri people call it "ronirári". The young cladodes (nopal) are boiled and eaten; the fruits ripen in August and are eaten raw after removing spines and peeling. However, it is recorded that excessive consumption may cause heart discomfort ("mal de corazón").
