= Opuntia megarrhiza =

Conservation status
- Endangered (IUCN 3.1)

Scientific classification
- Kingdom: Plantae
- Clade: Tracheophytes
- Clade: Angiosperms
- Clade: Eudicots
- Order: Caryophyllales
- Family: Cactaceae
- Genus: Opuntia
- Species: O. megarrhiza

Binomial name
- Opuntia megarrhiza Rose

Species of cactus

Opuntia megarrhiza Rose is a species of plant in the family Cactaceae. It is endemic to the state of San Luís Potosí in northeastern Mexico.

== Distribution and habitat ==
It is known only from five populations, around the summits of La Trinidad and Álvarez Mountain Ranges, in San Luis Potosí, northeastern Mexico. Its natural habitat is subtropical or tropical dry lowland grassland.

It is an endangered species, threatened by habitat loss, grazing, and harvest for traditional medicinal uses.

== Synonyms ==
- Opuntia megarrhiza Rose, Contr. U.S. Natl. Herb. 10:126. 1906.
  - Opuntia macrorhiza var. potosina Hernández-Valencia, Acta Cientifica Potosina 10:155-162. 1988.
