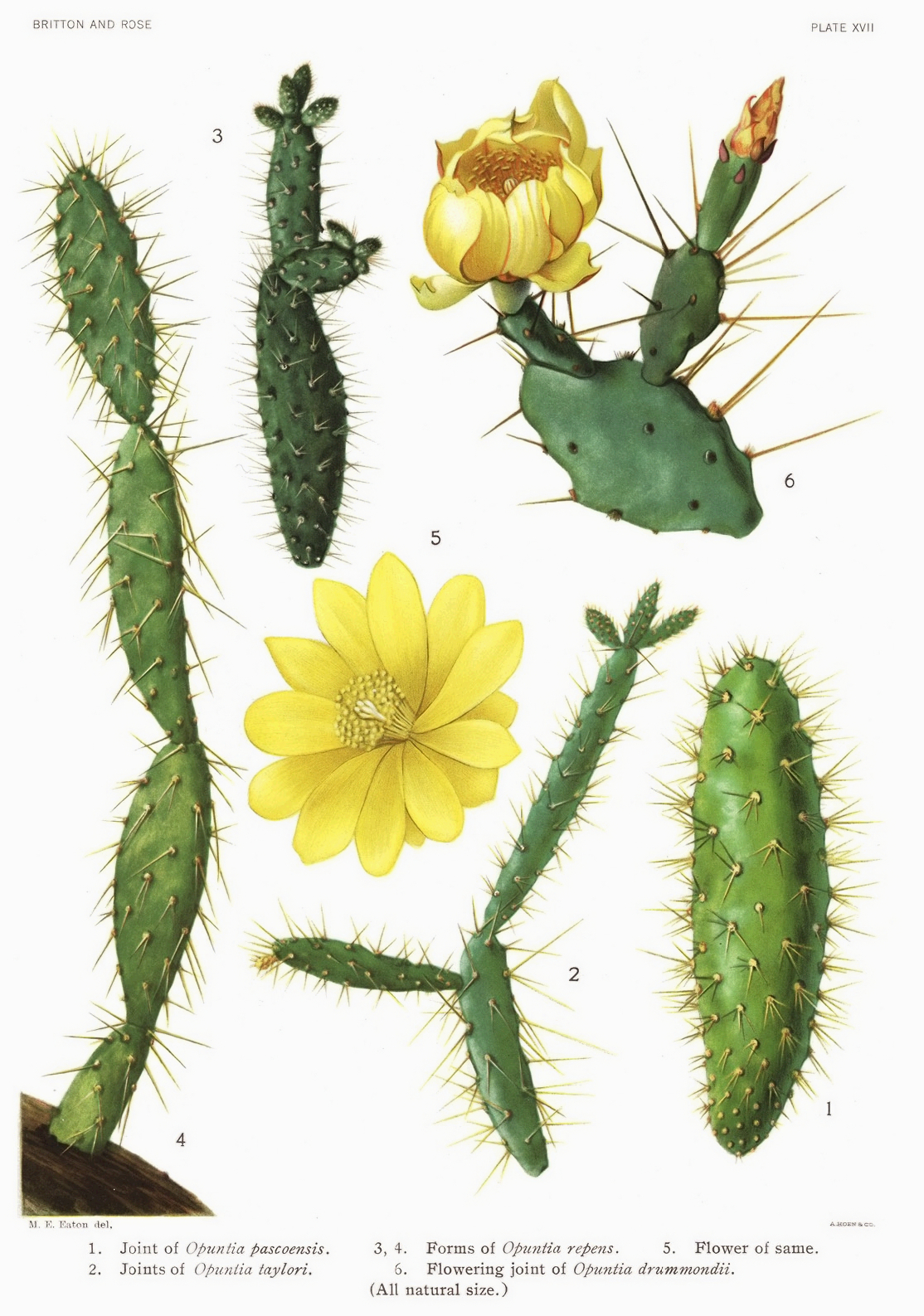
- Opuntia repens segments and flowers.

Conservation status
- Least Concern (IUCN 3.1)

Scientific classification
- Kingdom: Plantae
- Clade: Tracheophytes
- Clade: Angiosperms
- Clade: Eudicots
- Order: Caryophyllales
- Family: Cactaceae
- Genus: Opuntia
- Species: O. repens

Binomial name
- Opuntia repens Bello

= Opuntia repens =

Species of cactus

Opuntia repens, the roving pricklypear, is a species of cactus that is native to dry forests Puerto Rico and the Virgin Islands.

== Description ==
It is a small shrub, growing up to 50 cm (20 in) tall, with yellow flowers and red fruit. Like its cousins, "jumping cholla" Opuntias of the Mojave, Sonoran, and Colorado deserts, it propagates by a segment dislodging after spines are caught in a large mammal's fur, whereby the segment is transported to another location. This is in addition to propagation by seed.
