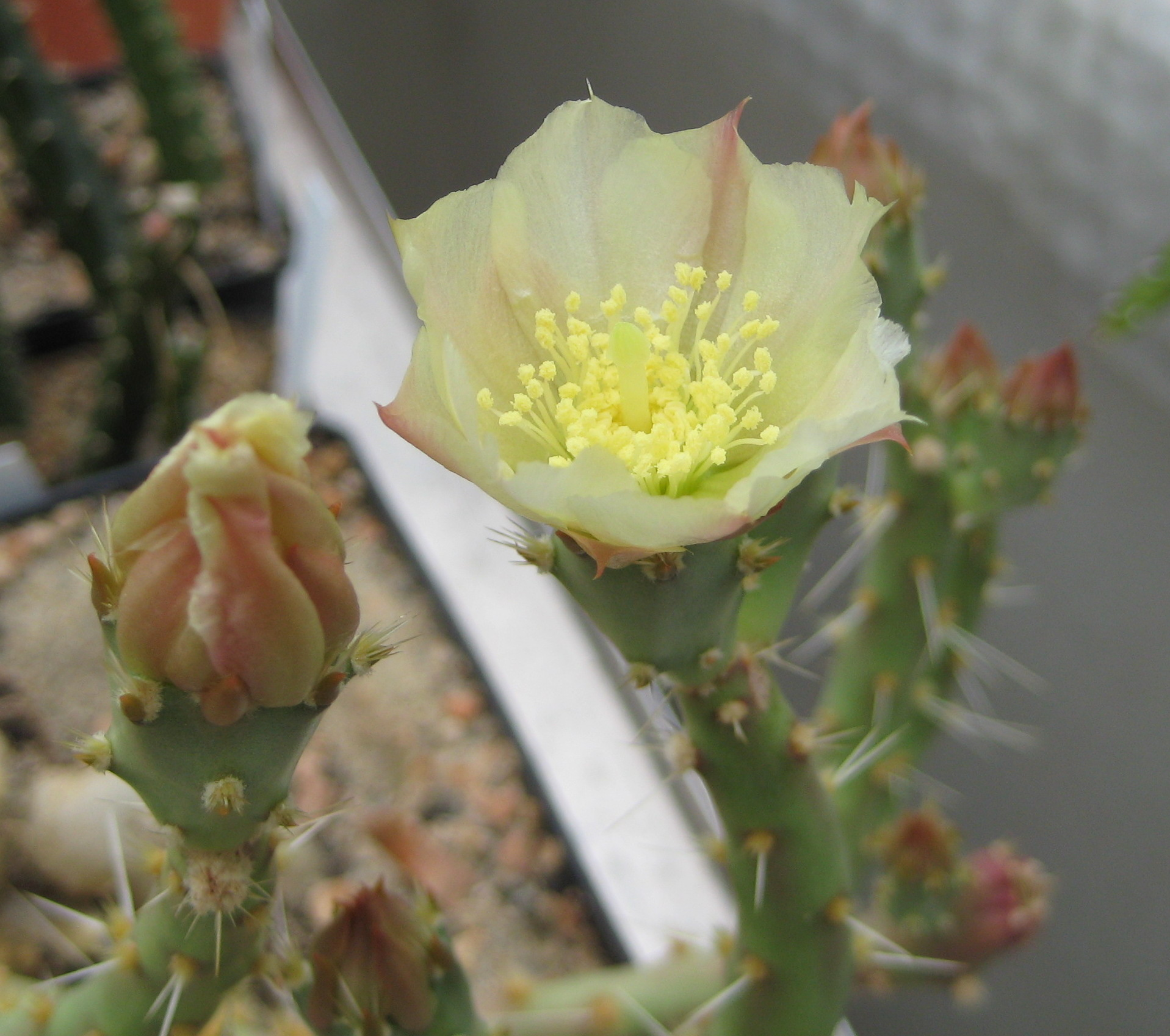

Conservation status
- Critically Endangered (IUCN 3.1)

Scientific classification
- Kingdom: Plantae
- Clade: Tracheophytes
- Clade: Angiosperms
- Clade: Eudicots
- Order: Caryophyllales
- Family: Cactaceae
- Genus: Opuntia
- Species: O. chaffeyi

Binomial name
- Opuntia chaffeyi Britton & Rose

= Opuntia chaffeyi =

Species of cactus

Opuntia chaffeyi is a species of plant in the family Cactaceae. It is endemic to Zacatecas state in Mexico. Its natural habitat is hot deserts. It is a Critically endangered species, threatened by habitat loss.
