= Opuntia rzedowskii =

Scientific classification
- Kingdom: Plantae
- Clade: Tracheophytes
- Clade: Angiosperms
- Clade: Eudicots
- Order: Caryophyllales
- Family: Cactaceae
- Subfamily: Opuntioideae
- Tribe: Opuntieae
- Genus: Opuntia
- Species: O. rzedowskii

Binomial name
- Opuntia rzedowskii Léia Scheinvar

Species of cactus

Opuntia rzedowskii, also known as Rzedowski's prickly pear, is a species of prickly pear cactus in the family Cactaceae.

Opuntia rzedowskii was described by Léia Scheinvar in 1976. However, many older descriptions were accounted for the same species, but under a different taxonomic name in the early 1900s.

== Distribution and habitat ==
It is native to central Mexico, specifically throughout parts of Guanajuato, Guerrero, Hidalgo, Jalisco, State Of Mexico, Michoacán, Nuevo León, Oaxaca, Puebla, Querétaro, San Luis Potosí, Tamaulipas, Tlaxcala, Veracruz, and Zacatecas, with most online observations being recorded in the outskirts of Mexico City.

It grows primarily in the dry shrub-land zone of Mexico, where it is found among grassy environments, such as hillsides or prairies.

== Taxonomy ==
Opuntia rzedowskii was originally assigned under Opuntia lasiacantha, until further research revealed a morphological difference between the two species, hence making Opuntia rzedowskii its own official taxon.
