= Opuntia hitchcockii =

Scientific classification
- Kingdom: Plantae
- Clade: Tracheophytes
- Clade: Angiosperms
- Clade: Eudicots
- Order: Caryophyllales
- Family: Cactaceae
- Subfamily: Opuntioideae
- Tribe: Opuntieae
- Genus: Opuntia
- Species: O. hitchcockii

Binomial name
- Opuntia hitchcockii González Ortega

Species of prickly pear cactus

Opuntia hitchcockii, commonly known as Hitchcock's prickly pear, is a species of prickly pear cactus in the family Cactaceae. It was described by Jesús González Ortega in 1929. The species range spreads throughout parts of Sinaloa, and Nayarit, where it grows primarily in the dry shrub-land zone of Mexico.
