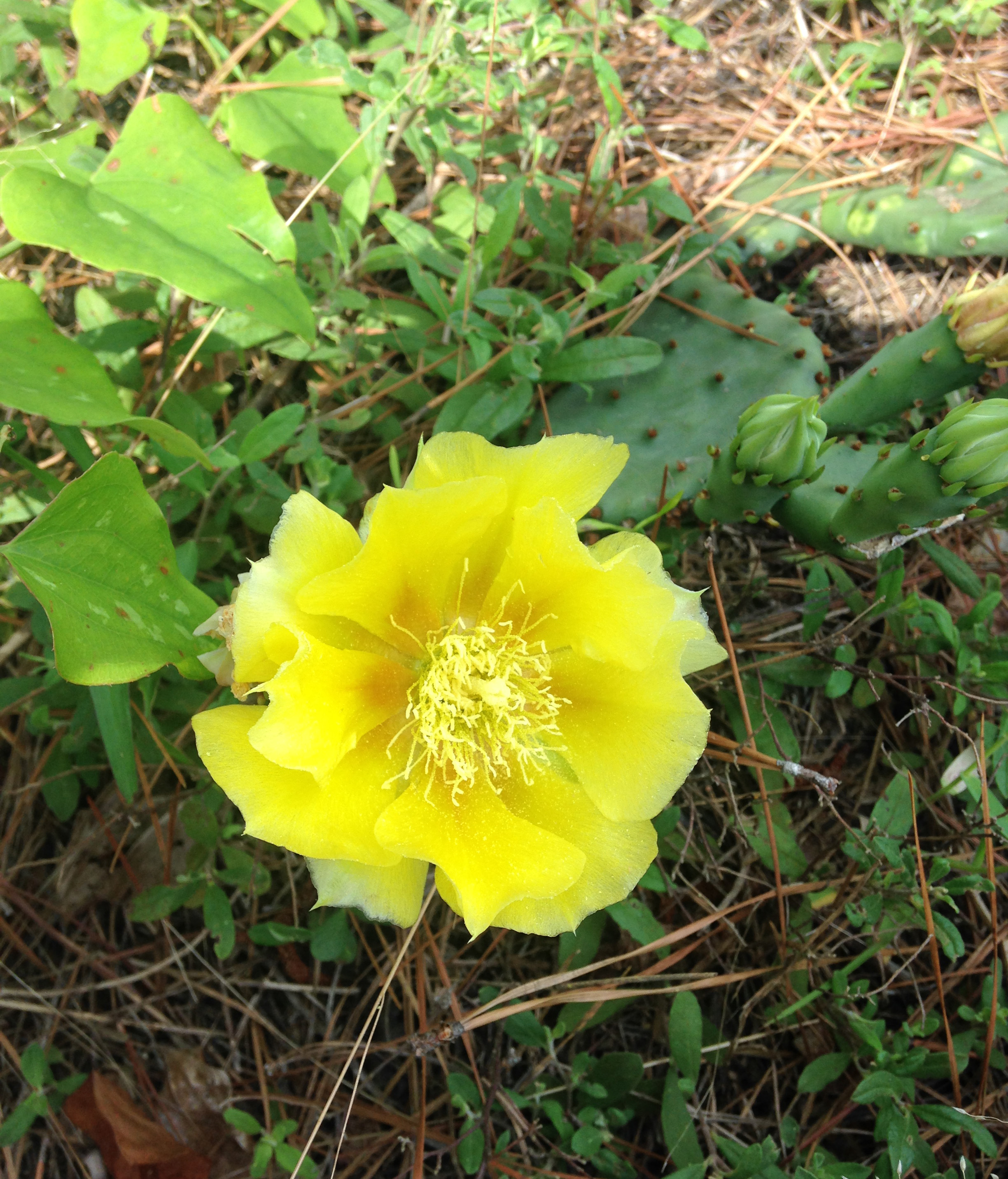

Scientific classification
- Kingdom: Plantae
- Clade: Tracheophytes
- Clade: Angiosperms
- Clade: Eudicots
- Order: Caryophyllales
- Family: Cactaceae
- Genus: Opuntia
- Species: O. nemoralis

Binomial name
- Opuntia nemoralis Griffiths

= Opuntia nemoralis =

Species of cactus

Opuntia nemoralis is a species of cactus (Cactaceae) native to the United States.

== Description ==
Opuntia nemoralis is closely related to Opuntia cespitosa. O. nemoralis can be distinguished by its smaller size, narrower cladodes that more easily disarticulate, barbed spines, and tepals that are yellow (rarely faintly pink) to the base.

== Distribution and habitat ==
It is found in the South-Central region, in the states of Arkansas, Louisiana, Texas, and with a single specimen tentatively identified from Missouri. Its natural habitat is in sandy prairies, saline and sodic barrens, and rock outcrops.

== Related species ==
Opuntia nemoralis has long been considered a synonym of Opuntia humifusa. However recent genetic analysis, in combination with distinct morphological features, suggested that recognition at the species level of many entities previously included under O. humifusa was warranted. In 2017 Opuntia nemoralis was resurrected as a species.
