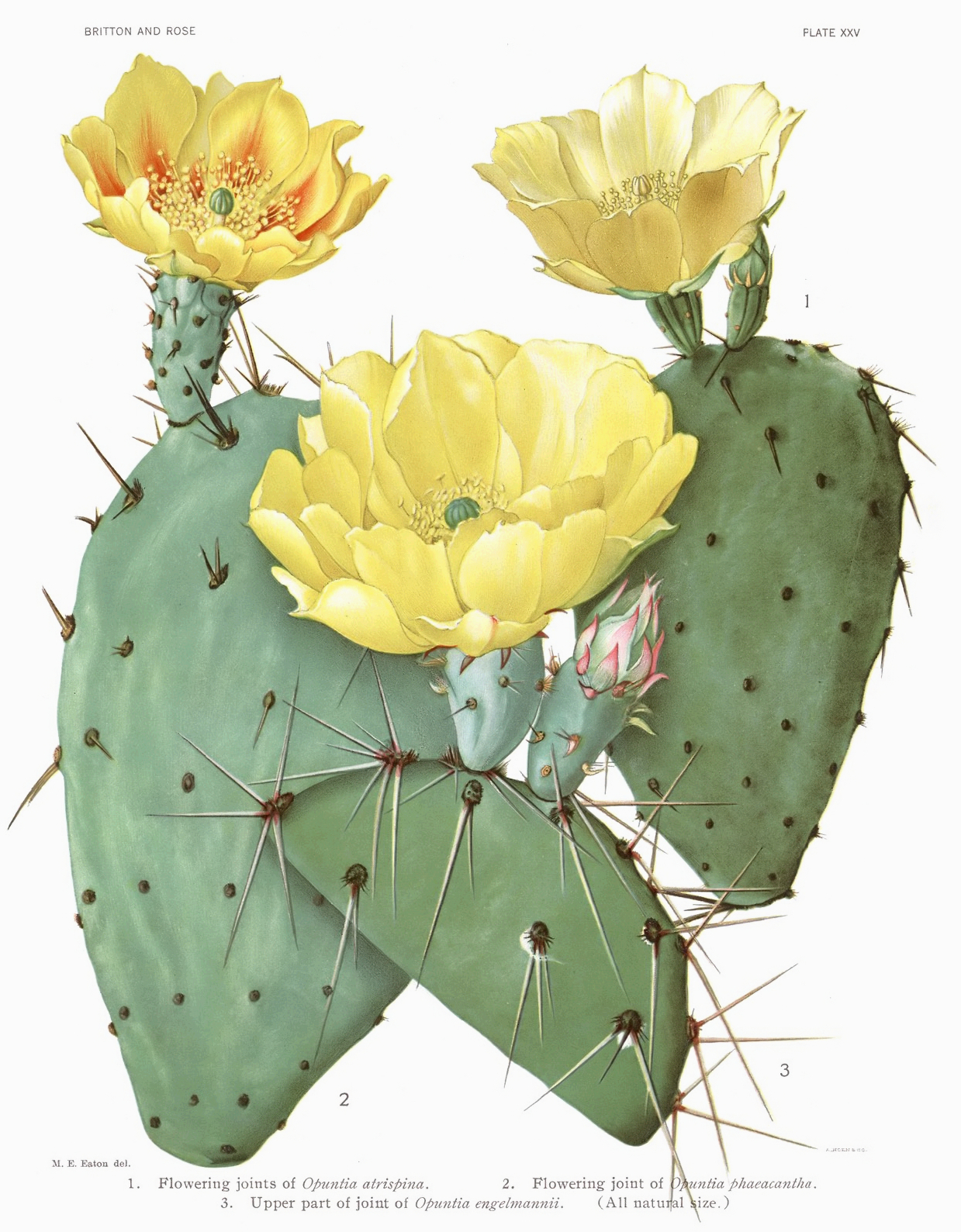
- Opuntia atrispina is on the right

Conservation status
- Least Concern (IUCN 3.1)

Scientific classification
- Kingdom: Plantae
- Clade: Tracheophytes
- Clade: Angiosperms
- Clade: Eudicots
- Order: Caryophyllales
- Family: Cactaceae
- Genus: Opuntia
- Species: O. atrispina

Binomial name
- Opuntia atrispina Griffiths

= Opuntia atrispina =

Species of cactus

Opuntia atrispina is a cactus species in the genus Opuntia.

== Description ==
The flowers open pale yellow (sometimes almost white) and darken with age to rose. Thus, the plants can be adorned with flowers of multiple colors: cream, yellow, salmon, and rose. Newly opened flowers can even have a hint of green in the middle. The spines are yellowish at the tips but dark brown at the bases.

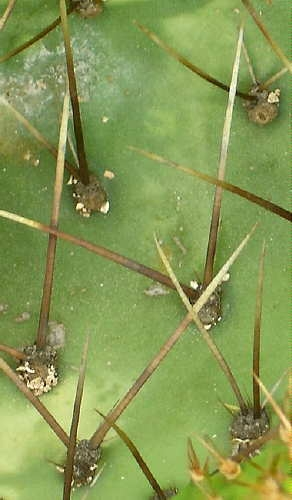
Spines

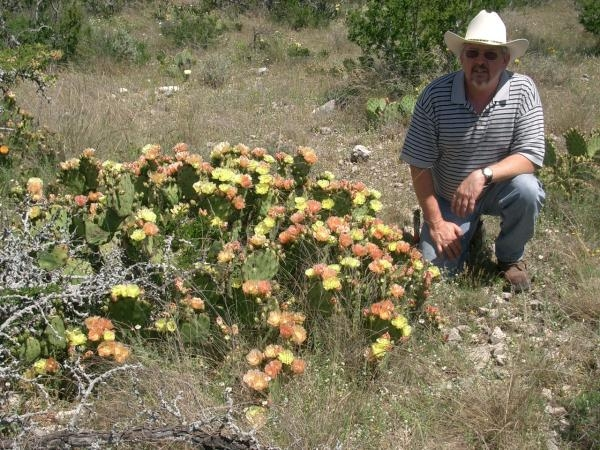
Opuntia atrispina in flower

== Distribution and habitat ==
The plant has limited distribution in the United States. In Texas it can be found from near Uvalde to Del Rio and Langtry—a small strip of area just 50 miles long.

== Etymology ==
The epithet of this species means "black-spined", denoting the fact that its spines are dark-brown to black at least in the lower part.
