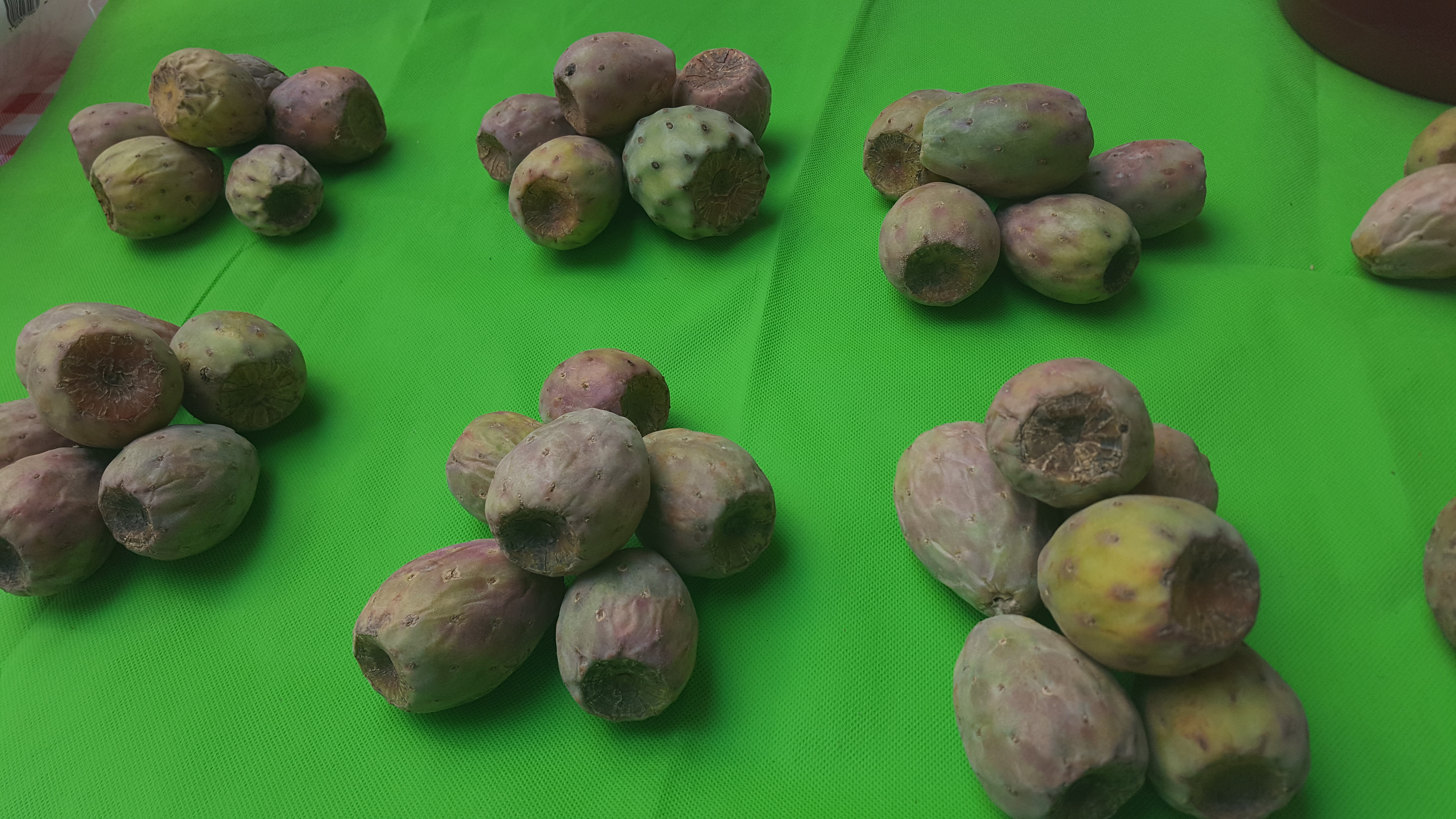
- Raw xoconostle at a fair in Hidalgo, Mexico.

Scientific classification
- Kingdom: Plantae
- Clade: Tracheophytes
- Clade: Angiosperms
- Clade: Eudicots
- Order: Caryophyllales
- Family: Cactaceae
- Genus: Opuntia
- Species: O. chiangiana

Binomial name
- Opuntia chiangiana Scheinvar & Manzanero

= Opuntia chiangiana =

Species of cactus

Opuntia chiangiana, commonly known as Chiang's prickly pear or the xoconostle, is a species of prickly pear cactus in the family Cactaceae. It was described by Léia Scheinvar and Gladys Manzanero in 2009. The species was named in honor of Fernando Chiang, who was a professor at the Institute of Biology of the National Autonomous University of Mexico.

== Description ==
Opuntia chiangiana on average reaches 8–10 ft. (2.4–3 m) tall, and forms reddish-purple, edible fruits, that are known to be very acidic. It forms long, sharp spines out of its pads, with fruit walls that do not fall off when they are fully mature. Natural predators to the cactus are generally limited, as the spines are very long and sharp on the fruit and the pads, so birds tend to stay away from the species' fruit for the most part.

== Distribution and habitat ==
It is endemic to the Cuicatlán District, Oaxaca, Mexico, where it grows exclusively in the subtropical zone. It is rare throughout its smaller-sized habitat, with scattered individuals and groupings. The species was introduced to India, most likely as an ornamental cactus.

== Conservation ==
No official conservation status has been assigned to Opuntia chiangiana yet, although there may be one in the future.

== Uses ==
Opuntia chiangiana is used almost primarily for its fruit, that potentially could fetch profit at a local farmers market, or in plain wholesale.
