= Opuntia inaequilateralis =

Scientific classification
- Kingdom: Plantae
- Clade: Tracheophytes
- Clade: Angiosperms
- Clade: Eudicots
- Order: Caryophyllales
- Family: Cactaceae
- Subfamily: Opuntioideae
- Tribe: Opuntieae
- Genus: Opuntia
- Species: O. inaequilateralis

Binomial name
- Opuntia inaequilateralis A.Berger

Synonyms
- Opuntia inaequilateralis var. angustior (F.Ritter) R.Crook & Mottram; Platyopuntia inaequilateralis (A.Berger) F.Ritter; Platyopuntia inaequilateralis var. angustior F.Ritter

Species of prickly pear cactus

Opuntia inaequilateralis, commonly known as the inequilateral prickly pear, is a species of prickly pear cactus in the family Cactaceae. It was described by Alwin Berger in 1905. The Latin name derived from the inequilateral shaped pads of the species, which are generally oblong. Its range spreads throughout parts of arid Peru, where it grows in the dry shrub-land zone, but is also seen in desert areas.
