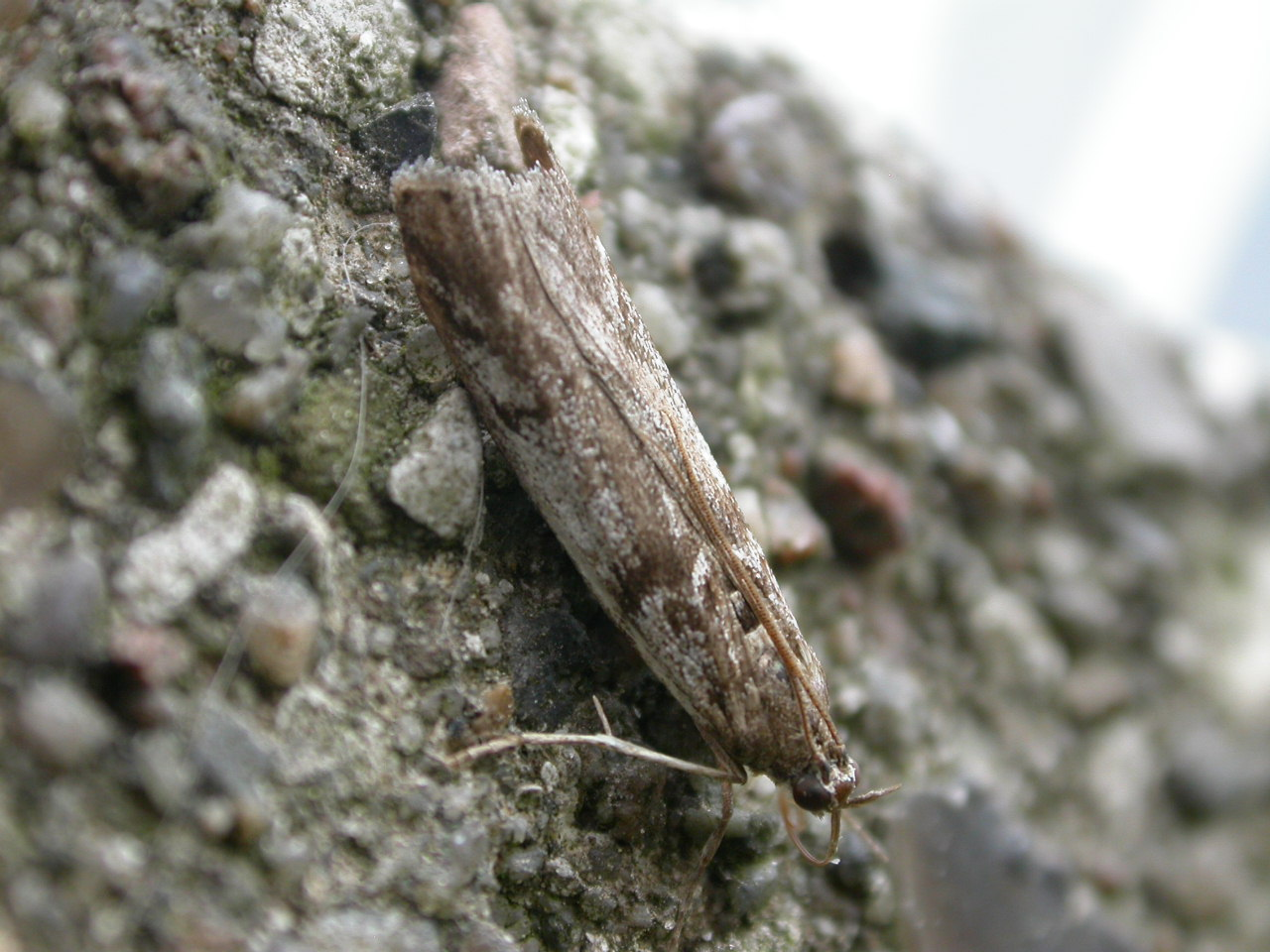
- Zophodia grossulariella

Scientific classification
- Kingdom: Animalia
- Phylum: Arthropoda
- Clade: Pancrustacea
- Class: Insecta
- Order: Lepidoptera
- Family: Pyralidae
- Subfamily: Phycitinae
- Tribe: Phycitini
- Genus: Zophodia; Hübner, [1825]

Synonyms
- Olyca Walker, 1857; Dakruma Grote, 1878; Parolyca Dyar, 1928; Nanaia Heinrich, 1939; Salambona Heinrich, 1939; Sigelgaita Heinrich, 1939; Amalafrida Heinrich, 1939

= Zophodia =

Genus of moths

Zophodia is a genus of snout moths in the subfamily Phycitinae. It was erected by Jacob Hübner in 1825.

== Species ==
- Zophodia epischnioides Hulst, 1900
- Zophodia grossulariella (Hübner, 1809)
- Zophodia multistriatella (A. Blanchard & Knudson, 1982)

== Taxonomy ==
The genera Alberada, Cactobrosis, Eremberga, Ozamia, Tucumania, Yosemitia and Melitara are included in Zophodia by some authors. If these are accepted as synonyms, a large number of species is added to the genus:

- Zophodia analamprella Dyar, 1922
- Zophodia apicigrammella (A. Blanchard & Knudson, 1985)
- Zophodia asthenosoma (Dyar, 1919)
- Zophodia bidentella Dyar, 1908
- Zophodia brevistrigella Ragonot, 1888
- Zophodia chilensis (Heinrich, 1939)
- Zophodia creabates (Dyar, 1923)
- Zophodia dentata Grote, 1876
- Zophodia didactica (Dyar, 1914)
- Zophodia doddalis (Dyar, 1925)
- Zophodia ebeniella (Ragonot, 1888)
- Zophodia fernaldialis (Hulst, 1886)
- Zophodia fieldiella Dyar, 1913
- Zophodia fuscomaculella (Wright, 1916)
- Zophodia graciella (Hulst, 1887)
- Zophodia hemilutella (Dyar, 1922)
- Zophodia holochlora Dyar, 1925
- Zophodia huanucensis (Heinrich, 1939)
- Zophodia immorella (Dyar, 1913)
- Zophodia insignatella (Dyar, 1914)
- Zophodia insignis (Heinrich, 1939)
- Zophodia junctolineella (Hulst, 1900)
- Zophodia leithella (Dyar, 1928)
- Zophodia leuconips (Dyar, 1925)
- Zophodia lignea de Joannis, 1927
- Zophodia longipennella (Hampson, 1901)
- Zophodia lucidalis (Walker, 1863)
- Zophodia maculifera (Dyar, 1914)
- Zophodia nephelepasa (Dyar, 1919)
- Zophodia parabates (Dyar, 1913)
- Zophodia pectinatella (Hampson in Ragonot, 1901)
- Zophodia penari Roesler & Küppers, 1981
- Zophodia phryganoides (Walker, 1857)
- Zophodia porrecta (Dyar, 1925)
- Zophodia prodenialis (Walker, 1863)
- Zophodia punicans (Heinrich, 1939)
- Zophodia stigmaferella Dyar, 1922
- Zophodia straminea Strand, 1915
- Zophodia subcanella (Zeller, 1848)
- Zophodia substituta (Heinrich, 1939)
- Zophodia subumbrella (Dyar, 1925)
- Zophodia tapiacola (Dyar, 1925)
- Zophodia texana (Neunzig, 1997)
- Zophodia thalassophila (Dyar, 1925)
- Zophodia transilis (Heinrich, 1939)
