= Ozamia clarefacta =

Scientific classification
- Kingdom: Animalia
- Phylum: Arthropoda
- Class: Insecta
- Order: Lepidoptera
- Family: Pyralidae
- Genus: Ozamia
- Species: O. clarefacta

Binomial name
- Ozamia clarefacta Dyar, 1919

Synonyms
- Ozamia fuscomaculella clarefacta Dyar, 1919; Zophodia clarefacta

Species of moth

Ozamia clarefacta is a species of snout moth in the genus Ozamia. It was described by Harrison Gray Dyar Jr. in 1919. It is found in Texas and Mexico

The forewings are gray with darker markings and the hindwings are pearly white with a narrow dark costal line. There are up to five generations per year.

The larvae feed on Opuntia species, including Opuntia lindheimeri and Opuntia cacanapa. They feed on the flowers and fruit of the host plant. Young larvae of the first generation are somewhat white and later turn pink or wine colored and become dull black in the last instars. Larvae of the other generations remain a light pink and do not turn dark when full grown. Pupation takes place in a loose cocoon among rubbish and soil, or occasionally in dead flower heads.

== Taxonomy ==
Ozamia clarefacta was described as a subspecies of Ozamia fuscomaculella.
