= Ozamia hemilutella =

Scientific classification
- Kingdom: Animalia
- Phylum: Arthropoda
- Class: Insecta
- Order: Lepidoptera
- Family: Pyralidae
- Genus: Ozamia
- Species: O. hemilutella

Binomial name
- Ozamia hemilutella Dyar, 1922

Synonyms
- Zophodia hemilutella

Species of moth

Ozamia hemilutella is a species of snout moth in the genus Ozamia. It was described by Harrison Gray Dyar Jr. in 1922. It is found in Argentina.

The wingspan is 27–30 mm. The forewings are grey with a clear-yellow inner area and the hindwings are white.

The larvae feed on Cereus validus and Opuntia quimilo. They feed on the fruit of their host plant. On Cereus validus, the young larvae enter the fruit near the base and tunnel into the seed cavity. Later, they attack the fleshy portions, and the fruit dries up. On Opuntia quimilo the larvae occur in the flowers and the crown of the fruit. The larvae are olive green. They have been recorded in February, April, June, August and November.
