= Melitara doddalis =

Scientific classification
- Kingdom: Animalia
- Phylum: Arthropoda
- Class: Insecta
- Order: Lepidoptera
- Family: Pyralidae
- Genus: Melitara
- Species: M. doddalis

Binomial name
- Melitara doddalis Dyar, 1925

Synonyms
- Zophodia doddalis

Species of moth, eats Opuntia

Melitara doddalis is a species of snout moth in the genus Melitara. It was described by Harrison Gray Dyar Jr. in 1925, and is found in the United States in southern Arizona, southern New Mexico, south-western Texas and in northern Mexico.

Adults are on wing from September to early October.

Pupation occurs on the ground during August and September.

== Food sources ==
The larvae feed on Opuntia ficus-indica, Opuntia macrorhiza var. macrorhiza and Opuntia phaeacantha var. phaeacantha. They tunnel downward into the basal segments of the host plant. In 2020 a study found that M. doddalis is unselective as to which Opuntiae it chooses to feed upon.

== Taxonomy ==
The species was previously considered a synonym of Melitara dentata.
