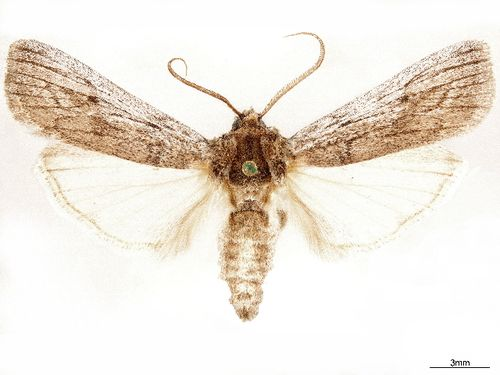

Scientific classification
- Domain: Eukaryota
- Kingdom: Animalia
- Phylum: Arthropoda
- Class: Insecta
- Order: Lepidoptera
- Family: Pyralidae
- Genus: Melitara
- Species: M. junctolineella

Binomial name
- Melitara junctolineella Hulst, 1900

Synonyms
- Zophodia junctolineella; Olycella junctolineella

= Melitara junctolineella =

Species of moth

Melitara junctolineella is a species of snout moth in the genus Melitara. It was described by George Duryea Hulst in 1900. It is found in southern Texas (from Brownsville to Presidio) and Mexico (along the coastal plain south from Texas to Tampico). The species has been introduced in Australia as a biological control agent of Opuntia stricta.

Adults are on wing from mid-January to May and again from late August to early November. There are two generations per year.

The larvae feed on Opuntia rufida, Opuntia macrorhiza var. macrorhiza, Opuntia stricta var. stricta and Opuntia lindheimeri var. lindheimeri. Second-generation larvae feed during winter, and pupate in January.
