= Zophodia subcanella =

Scientific classification
- Kingdom: Animalia
- Phylum: Arthropoda
- Clade: Pancrustacea
- Class: Insecta
- Order: Lepidoptera
- Family: Pyralidae
- Genus: Zophodia
- Species: Z. subcanella

Binomial name
- Zophodia subcanella (Zeller, 1848)

Synonyms
- Myelois subcanella Zeller, 1848

Species of moth

Zophodia subcanella is a species of snout moth in the genus Zophodia. It was described by Zeller in 1848. It is found in Brazil.
