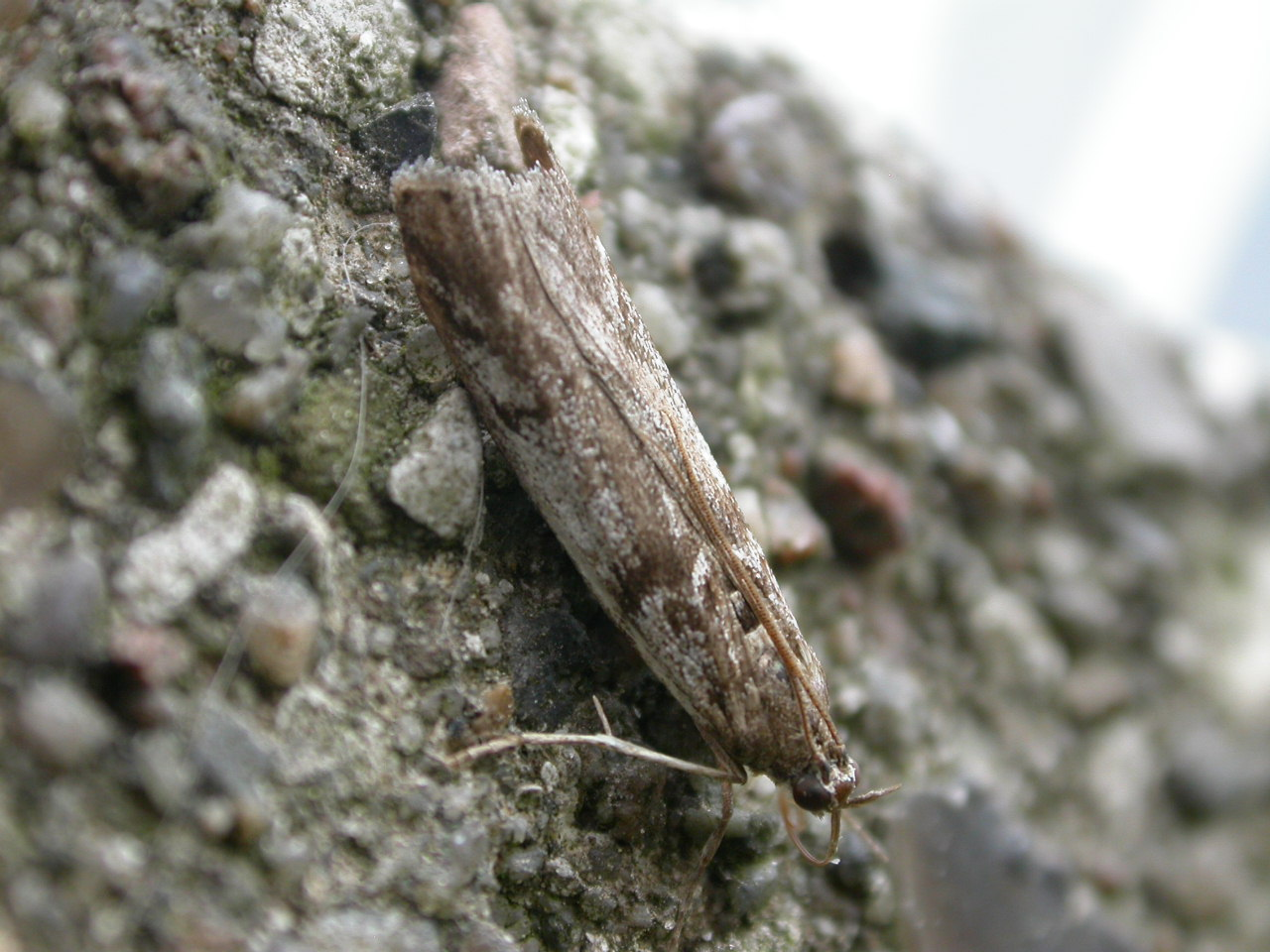

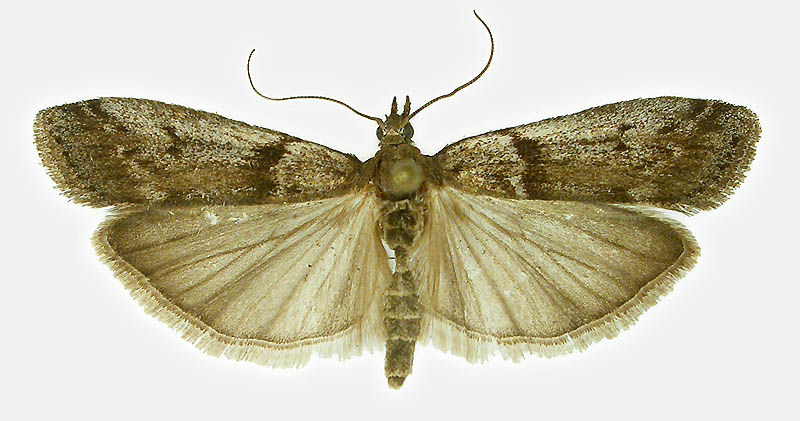

Scientific classification
- Kingdom: Animalia
- Phylum: Arthropoda
- Class: Insecta
- Order: Lepidoptera
- Family: Pyralidae
- Genus: Zophodia
- Species: Z. grossulariella

Binomial name
- Zophodia grossulariella Zincken, 1809

Synonyms
- Tinea grossulariella Hübner, 1809; Tinea convolutella Hübner, 1796; Zophodia convolutella var. pallidella Lambillon, 1921; Dakruma convolutella Grote, 1882; Dakruma turbatella Grote, 1878; Euzophera franconiella Hulst, 1890; Pempelia grossulariae C. V. Riley, 1869; Zophodia grossulariella robineaui Leraut, 1997; Zophodia bella Hulst, 1892; Zophodia grossulariae dilattivitta Dyar, 1925; Zophodia grossulariae ihouna Dyar, 1925; Zophodia grossulariae magnificans Dyar, 1925; Zophodia grossularialis Hübner, 1825

= Zophodia grossulariella =

Species of moth

Zophodia grossulariella is a species of moth of the family Pyralidae. It is found in Europe (up to the Netherlands and England) and North America.

The wingspan is 25–36 mm. The moths are on wing from April to May depending on the location.

The larvae feed on Ribes uva-crispa.
