= Zophodia huanucensis =

Scientific classification
- Domain: Eukaryota
- Kingdom: Animalia
- Phylum: Arthropoda
- Class: Insecta
- Order: Lepidoptera
- Family: Pyralidae
- Genus: Zophodia
- Species: Z. huanucensis

Binomial name
- Zophodia huanucensis (Heinrich, 1939)

Synonyms
- Sigelgaita huanucensis Heinrich, 1939

Species of moth

Zophodia huanucensis is a species of snout moth in the genus Zophodia. It was described by Carl Heinrich in 1939. It is found in Peru.

The wingspan is about 45 mm. The forewings are grey with a brown shade and darker markings and the hindwings are almost wholly white.

The larvae feed on Opuntia ficus-indica. They feed on the fruit and occasionally the young growth. They are solitary feeders, which normally complete their development in one fruit, but sometimes two adjacent fruits are attacked by a single larva. The larvae are blue-green. Pupation takes place in a cocoon made within the hollowed-out fruit.
