= Yosemitia =

Scientific classification
- Domain: Eukaryota
- Kingdom: Animalia
- Phylum: Arthropoda
- Class: Insecta
- Order: Lepidoptera
- Family: Pyralidae
- Tribe: Phycitini
- Genus: Yosemitia; Ragonot, 1901

Genus of moths

Yosemitia is a genus of snout moths in the subfamily Phycitinae. It was first described by Émile Louis Ragonot in 1901. Some sources list it as synonymous with Zophodia, while others retain it as a valid genus.

== Species ==
- Yosemitia didactica (Dyar, 1914)
- Yosemitia fieldiella (Dyar, 1913)
- Yosemitia graciella (Hulst, 1887)
