= Ozamia =

Scientific classification
- Domain: Eukaryota
- Kingdom: Animalia
- Phylum: Arthropoda
- Class: Insecta
- Order: Lepidoptera
- Family: Pyralidae
- Subfamily: Phycitinae
- Genus: Ozamia; Hampson in Ragonot, 1901

Genus of moths

Ozamia is a genus of snout moths in the subfamily Phycitinae. It was described by George Hampson in 1901. Some sources list it as a synonym of Zophodia, while others retain it as a valid genus.

== Species ==
- Ozamia clarefacta Dyar, 1919
- Ozamia fuscomaculella (W. S. Wright, 1916)
- Ozamia hemilutella Dyar, 1922
- Ozamia immorella (Dyar, 1913)
- Ozamia lucidalis (Walker, 1863)
- Ozamia punicans Heinrich, 1939
- Ozamia stigmaferella (Dyar, 1922)
- Ozamia thalassophila Dyar, 1925
