= Zophodia nephelepasa =

Scientific classification
- Kingdom: Animalia
- Phylum: Arthropoda
- Class: Insecta
- Order: Lepidoptera
- Family: Pyralidae
- Genus: Zophodia
- Species: Z. nephelepasa

Binomial name
- Zophodia nephelepasa (Dyar, 1919)

Synonyms
- Olyca nephelepasa Dyar, 1919; Olycella nephelepasa

Species of moth

Zophodia nephelepasa is a species of snout moth in the genus Zophodia. It was described by Harrison Gray Dyar Jr. in 1919. It is found in Mexico.

There are probably two generations per year.

The larvae feed on Opuntia species, including Opuntia tomentosa, Opuntia streptacantha, Opuntia robusta and Opuntia cantabrigiensis species.
