= Zophodia analamprella =

Scientific classification
- Kingdom: Animalia
- Phylum: Arthropoda
- Class: Insecta
- Order: Lepidoptera
- Family: Pyralidae
- Genus: Zophodia
- Species: Z. analamprella

Binomial name
- Zophodia analamprella Dyar, 1922

Synonyms
- Salambona analamprella

Species of moth

Zophodia analamprella is a species of snout moth in the genus Zophodia. It was described by Harrison Gray Dyar Jr. in 1922. It is found in Argentina and is possibly also present in Paraguay.

The wingspan is about 25 mm. The forewings are dark grey brown with a broad, white stripe along the anterior margin. The hindwings are pearly white, with dusky outer edges. There are probably at least three generations per year.

The larvae are either herbivorous or carnivorous. In the early summer, the larvae attack the flower buds, flowers, young fruit, and young growth of Opuntia species, while in the late summer and autumn they are predacious on cochineal mealy bugs of the genus Dactylopius, which feed on prickly pear. The larvae live singly in tunnels in the segments beneath the cochineal cultures. If all mealy bugs have been eaten before the larva is full grown, it may extend the tunnel for some distance and complete its development as a plant feeder. The larvae are grey green or black green. Pupation takes place in a white cocoon among debris around the host plant.
