= Zophodia pectinatella =

Scientific classification
- Kingdom: Animalia
- Phylum: Arthropoda
- Class: Insecta
- Order: Lepidoptera
- Family: Pyralidae
- Genus: Zophodia
- Species: Z. pectinatella

Binomial name
- Zophodia pectinatella (Hampson in Ragonot, 1901)

Synonyms
- Olyca pectinatella Hampson in Ragonot, 1901; Melitara junctolineella pectinatella

Species of moth

Zophodia pectinatella is a species of snout moth in the genus Zophodia. It was described by George Hampson in 1901. It is found in Mexico.
