= Ozamia stigmaferella =

Scientific classification
- Kingdom: Animalia
- Phylum: Arthropoda
- Class: Insecta
- Order: Lepidoptera
- Family: Pyralidae
- Genus: Ozamia
- Species: O. stigmaferella

Binomial name
- Ozamia stigmaferella (Dyar, 1922)

Synonyms
- Zophodia stigmaferella Dyar, 1922

Species of moth

Ozamia stigmaferella is a species of snout moth in the genus Ozamia. It was described by Harrison Gray Dyar Jr. in 1922. It is found in Argentina.

The wingspan is 26 mm. The forewings are dark grey with darker markings and the hindwings are white.

The larvae feed on Cereus validus. They feed in the stem of their host plant.
