= Zophodia ebeniella =

Scientific classification
- Kingdom: Animalia
- Phylum: Arthropoda
- Clade: Pancrustacea
- Class: Insecta
- Order: Lepidoptera
- Family: Pyralidae
- Genus: Zophodia
- Species: Z. ebeniella

Binomial name
- Zophodia ebeniella (Ragonot, 1888)

Synonyms
- Rhodophaea ebeniella Ragonot, 1888

Species of moth

Zophodia ebeniella is a species of snout moth in the genus Zophodia. It was described by Émile Louis Ragonot in 1888. It is found in Mozambique and South Africa.
