= Zophodia asthenosoma =

Scientific classification
- Kingdom: Animalia
- Phylum: Arthropoda
- Class: Insecta
- Order: Lepidoptera
- Family: Pyralidae
- Genus: Zophodia
- Species: Z. asthenosoma

Binomial name
- Zophodia asthenosoma (Dyar, 1919)

Synonyms
- Olyca asthenosoma Dyar, 1919; Parolyca asthenosoma

Species of moth

Zophodia asthenosoma is a species of snout moth in the genus Zophodia. It was described by Harrison Gray Dyar Jr. in 1919. It is found in French Guiana.
