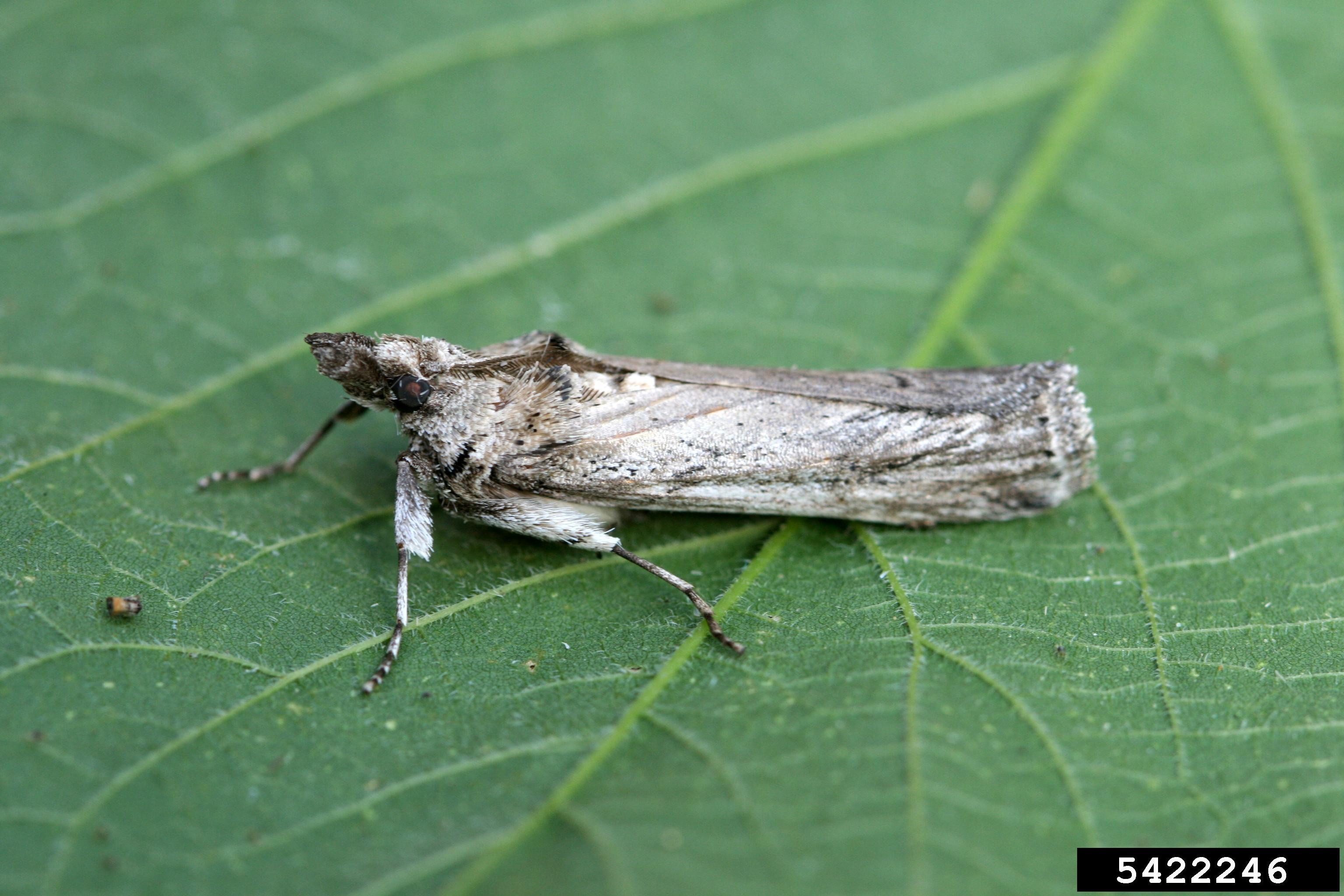
- Melitara dentata (adult)

Scientific classification
- Kingdom: Animalia
- Phylum: Arthropoda
- Class: Insecta
- Order: Lepidoptera
- Family: Pyralidae
- Tribe: Phycitini
- Genus: Melitara; Walker, 1863

Synonyms
- Megaphycis Grote, 1882; Olycella Dyar, 1928

= Melitara =

Genus of insects

Melitara is a genus of snout moths in the subfamily Phycitinae. It was described by Francis Walker in 1863. Some sources list it as a synonym of Zophodia, while others retain it as a valid genus.

== Species ==
- Melitara apicigrammella Blanchard & Knudson, 1985
- Melitara dentata (Grote, 1876) – North American cactus moth
- Melitara doddalis Dyar, 1925
- Melitara junctolineella (Hulst, 1900)
- Melitara prodenialis Walker, 1863
- Melitara subumbrella (Dyar, 1925)
- Melitara texana Neunzig, 1997
