= Zophodia penari =

Scientific classification
- Domain: Eukaryota
- Kingdom: Animalia
- Phylum: Arthropoda
- Class: Insecta
- Order: Lepidoptera
- Family: Pyralidae
- Genus: Zophodia
- Species: Z. penari

Binomial name
- Zophodia penari Roesler & Küppers, 1981

Species of moth

Zophodia penari is a species of snout moth in the genus Zophodia. It was described by Roesler and Küppers in 1981. It is found on Sumatra.
