= Zophodia phryganoides =

Scientific classification
- Kingdom: Animalia
- Phylum: Arthropoda
- Class: Insecta
- Order: Lepidoptera
- Family: Pyralidae
- Genus: Zophodia
- Species: Z. phryganoides

Binomial name
- Zophodia phryganoides (Walker, 1857)

Synonyms
- Olyca phryganoides Walker, 1857

Species of moth

Zophodia phryganoides is a species of snout moth in the genus Zophodia. It was described by Francis Walker in 1857. It is found on Hispaniola. There are at least two generations per year.

The larvae feed on Platyopuntia and Consolea species. They feed in the stem of their host plant.
