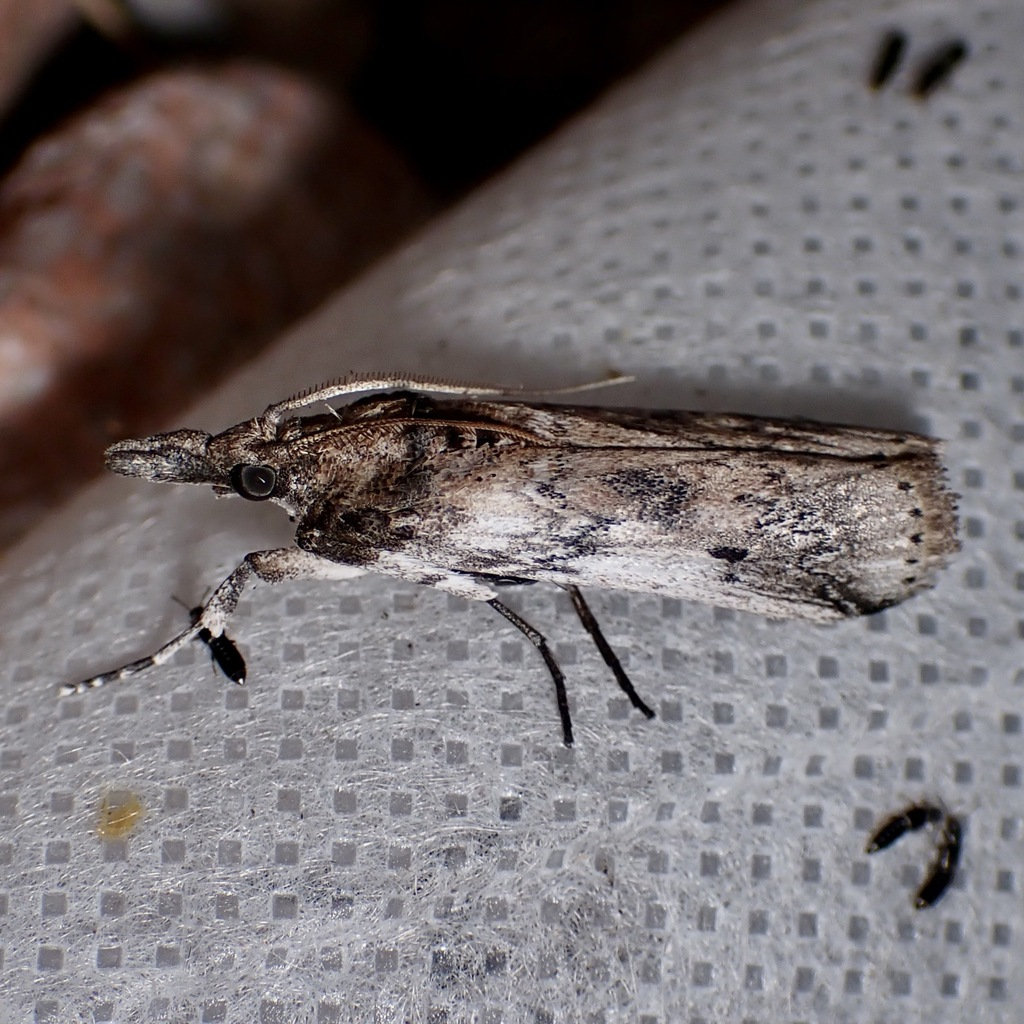

Scientific classification
- Kingdom: Animalia
- Phylum: Arthropoda
- Clade: Pancrustacea
- Class: Insecta
- Order: Lepidoptera
- Family: Pyralidae
- Genus: Alberada
- Species: A. franclemonti

Binomial name
- Alberada franclemonti Neunzig, 1997

Synonyms
- Zophodia franclemonti

= Alberada franclemonti =

Species of moth

Alberada franclemonti is a species of snout moth in the genus Alberada that was described by Herbert H. Neunzig in 1997 and is known from the US state of Arizona.
