= Zophodia epischnioides =

Scientific classification
- Domain: Eukaryota
- Kingdom: Animalia
- Phylum: Arthropoda
- Class: Insecta
- Order: Lepidoptera
- Family: Pyralidae
- Genus: Zophodia
- Species: Z. epischnioides

Binomial name
- Zophodia epischnioides Hulst, 1900

Synonyms
- Hypsotropa epischnioides

Species of moth

Zophodia epischnioides is a species of snout moth in the genus Zophodia. It was described by George Duryea Hulst in 1900. It is found in North America. It is probably a synonym of another Zophodia species or a species of a related genus, but the type is lost and it is thus not possible to determine the status of this species.
