= Alberada candida =

Scientific classification
- Kingdom: Animalia
- Phylum: Arthropoda
- Class: Insecta
- Order: Lepidoptera
- Family: Pyralidae
- Genus: Alberada
- Species: A. candida

Binomial name
- Alberada candida Neunzig, 1997

Synonyms
- Zophodia candida

Species of moth

Alberada candida is a species of snout moth in the genus Alberada that was described by Herbert H. Neunzig in 1997 and is known from the US state of California.
