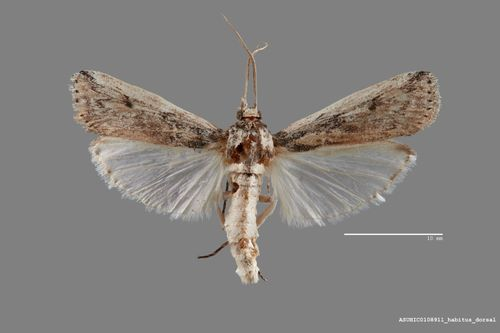

Scientific classification
- Kingdom: Animalia
- Phylum: Arthropoda
- Class: Insecta
- Order: Lepidoptera
- Family: Pyralidae
- Genus: Alberada
- Species: A. californiensis

Binomial name
- Alberada californiensis Neunzig, 1997

Synonyms
- Zophodia californiensis

= Alberada californiensis =

Species of moth

Alberada californiensis is a species of snout moth in the genus Alberada that was described by Herbert H. Neunzig in 1997 and is known from the U.S. state of California.
