= Melitara texana =

Scientific classification
- Domain: Eukaryota
- Kingdom: Animalia
- Phylum: Arthropoda
- Class: Insecta
- Order: Lepidoptera
- Family: Pyralidae
- Genus: Melitara
- Species: M. texana

Binomial name
- Melitara texana Neunzig, 1997

Synonyms
- Zophodia texana

Species of moth

Melitara texana is a species of snout moth in the genus Melitara. It was described by Herbert H. Neunzig in 1997 and is found in southern Texas and adjacent Mexico.

The larvae feed on Opuntia lindheimeri var. lindheimeri.
