= Zophodia substituta =

Scientific classification
- Domain: Eukaryota
- Kingdom: Animalia
- Phylum: Arthropoda
- Class: Insecta
- Order: Lepidoptera
- Family: Pyralidae
- Genus: Zophodia
- Species: Z. substituta

Binomial name
- Zophodia substituta (Heinrich, 1939)

Synonyms
- Nanaia substituta Heinrich, 1939

Species of moth

Zophodia substituta is a species of snout moth in the genus Zophodia. It was described by Carl Heinrich in 1939. It is found in Peru.

The wingspan is about 36 mm.

The larvae feed on Cylindropuntia and possibly Echinopsis species. They feed in the stem of their host plant.
