= Zophodia chilensis =

Scientific classification
- Kingdom: Animalia
- Phylum: Arthropoda
- Class: Insecta
- Order: Lepidoptera
- Family: Pyralidae
- Genus: Zophodia
- Species: Z. chilensis

Binomial name
- Zophodia chilensis (Heinrich, 1939)

Synonyms
- Sigelgaita chilensis Heinrich, 1939

Species of moth

Zophodia chilensis is a species of snout moth in the genus Zophodia. It was described by Carl Heinrich in 1939. It is found in Chile.

The wingspan is 30–45 mm. The forewings are grey with darker markings and the hindwings are lightly suffused fuscous.

The larvae feed on Eulychnia acida and Trichocereus chiloensis. They feed on and within the fruit of their host plant. They enter the fruit at the base and tunnel into the seed cavity. When an infested fruit rots, the larvae move to an adjacent fruit. When full grown, the larvae lower themselves to the ground by a thread and spin a cocoon among the debris where pupation takes place. The larvae are blue to blue green.
