= Zophodia straminea =

Scientific classification
- Domain: Eukaryota
- Kingdom: Animalia
- Phylum: Arthropoda
- Class: Insecta
- Order: Lepidoptera
- Family: Pyralidae
- Genus: Zophodia
- Species: Z. straminea

Binomial name
- Zophodia straminea Strand, 1915

Species of moth

Zophodia straminea is a species of snout moth in the genus Zophodia. It was described by Strand in 1915. It is found in South Sudan.
