= Zophodia leithella =

Scientific classification
- Kingdom: Animalia
- Phylum: Arthropoda
- Class: Insecta
- Order: Lepidoptera
- Family: Pyralidae
- Genus: Zophodia
- Species: Z. leithella

Binomial name
- Zophodia leithella (Dyar, 1928)

Synonyms
- Cactoblastis leithella Dyar, 1928; Amalafrida leithella

Species of moth

Zophodia leithella is a species of snout moth in the genus Zophodia.

== History ==
It was described by Harrison Gray Dyar Jr. in 1928.

== Location ==
It is found in northern Venezuela and Colombia, in the Caribbean (Curaçao) and in southern Mexico.

== Appearance ==
The wingspan is 30–33 mm. The forewings are greyish brown with darker markings and the hindwings are almost wholly white in males and mainly fuscous in females.

== Larval Behaviours & Life Cycle ==
The larvae feed on Platyopuntia species. They are solitary and feed within the stem of their host plant. The larvae are greyish with broad transverse bands. Full-grown larvae cut through the cuticle of the host plant to form a trapdoor, the free edges of which are cemented to the surface. The cocoon is spun within the larval cavity and possesses a long neck extending to the trapdoor, which is pushed open by the emerging adult.
