= Eremberga =

Scientific classification
- Domain: Eukaryota
- Kingdom: Animalia
- Phylum: Arthropoda
- Class: Insecta
- Order: Lepidoptera
- Family: Pyralidae
- Tribe: Phycitini
- Genus: Eremberga; Heinrich, 1939

Genus of moths

Eremberga is a genus of snout moths in the subfamily Phycitinae. It was described by Carl Heinrich in 1939. Some sources list it as a synonym of Zophodia, while others retain it as a valid genus.

== Species ==
- Eremberga creabates (Dyar, 1923)
- Eremberga insignis Heinrich, 1939
- Eremberga leuconips (Dyar, 1925)
