= Zophodia multistriatella =

Scientific classification
- Kingdom: Animalia
- Phylum: Arthropoda
- Class: Insecta
- Order: Lepidoptera
- Family: Pyralidae
- Genus: Zophodia
- Species: Z. multistriatella

Binomial name
- Zophodia multistriatella (Blanchard & Knudson, 1982)

Synonyms
- Ozamia multistriatella Blanchard & Knudson, 1982

Species of moth

Zophodia multistriatella is a species of snout moth in the genus Zophodia. It was described by André Blanchard and Edward C. Knudson in 1982. It is found in the US states of Texas, Arizona and New Mexico.

The length of the forewings is 11.8-13.5 mm for males and 11.3-12.6 mm for females.

The larvae probably feed on Opuntia species.
