= Alberada =

Scientific classification
- Kingdom: Animalia
- Phylum: Arthropoda
- Clade: Pancrustacea
- Class: Insecta
- Order: Lepidoptera
- Family: Pyralidae
- Tribe: Phycitini
- Genus: Alberada; Heinrich, 1939

Genus of moths

Alberada is a genus of snout moths in the subfamily Phycitinae. It was described by C. Heinrich in 1939. Some sources list it as a synonym of Zophodia, while others retain it as a valid genus.

== Species ==
- Alberada bidentella (Dyar, 1908)
- Alberada californiensis Neunzig, 1997
- Alberada candida Neunzig, 1997
- Alberada franclemonti Neunzig, 1997
- Alberada parabates (Dyar, 1913)
