= Zophodia lignea =

Scientific classification
- Domain: Eukaryota
- Kingdom: Animalia
- Phylum: Arthropoda
- Class: Insecta
- Order: Lepidoptera
- Family: Pyralidae
- Genus: Zophodia
- Species: Z. lignea

Binomial name
- Zophodia lignea de Joannis, 1927

Species of moth

Zophodia lignea is a species of snout moth in the genus Zophodia. It was described by Joseph de Joannis in 1927. It is found in Mozambique and South Africa.
