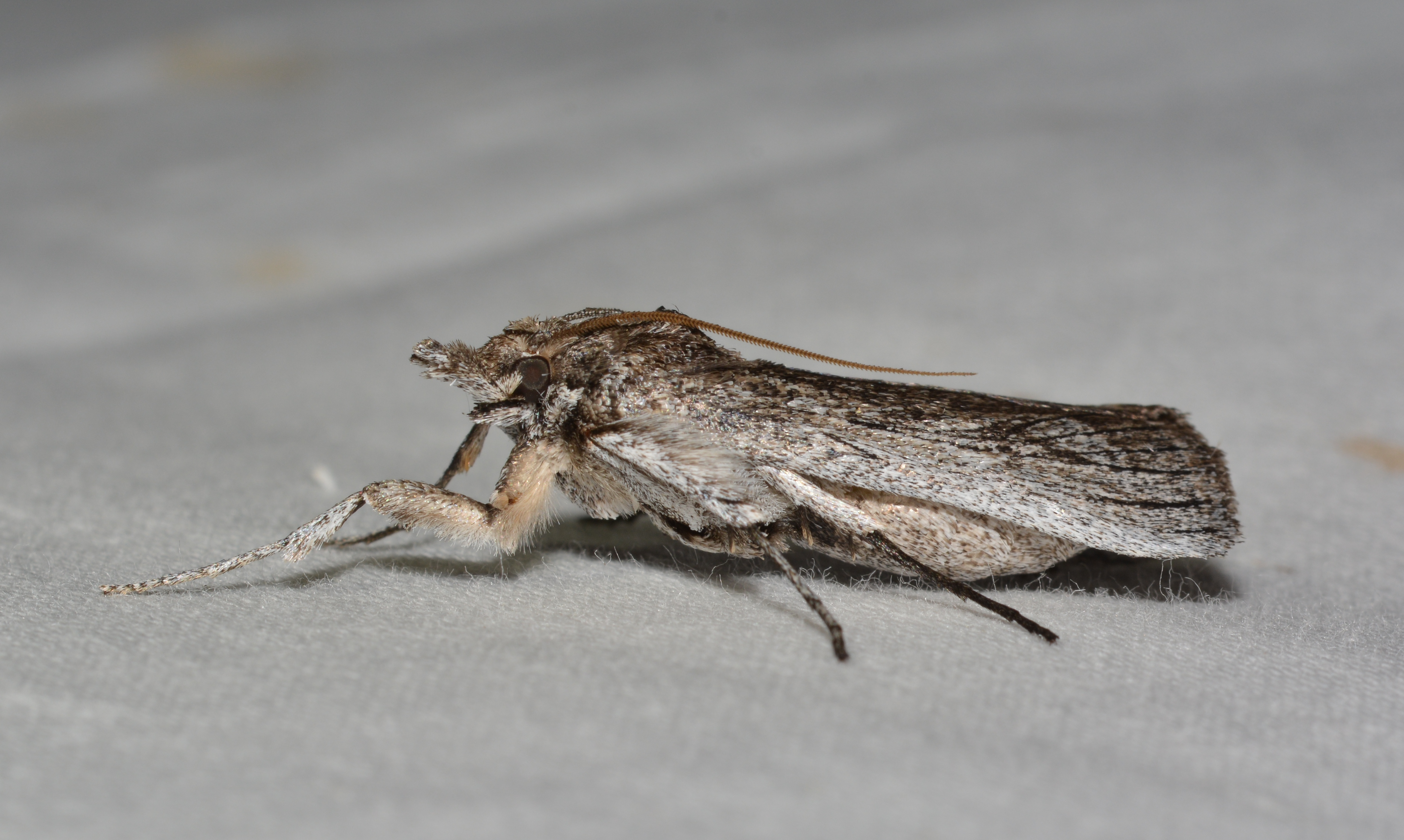
- Melitara subumbrella

Scientific classification
- Kingdom: Animalia
- Phylum: Arthropoda
- Class: Insecta
- Order: Lepidoptera
- Family: Pyralidae
- Genus: Melitara
- Species: M. subumbrella

Binomial name
- Melitara subumbrella (Dyar, 1925)

Synonyms
- Olycella subumbrella Dyar, 1925; Zophodia subumbrella

= Melitara subumbrella =

Species of moth

Melitara subumbrella is a species of snout moth in the genus Melitara. It was described by Harrison Gray Dyar Jr. in 1925. It is widespread in western North America, from southern Alberta and Saskatchewan to southern Arizona, central Texas, southern New Mexico and south-eastern California.

The wingspan is 35–52 mm. Adults are on wing from March to May. A second generation may occur on some locations, with adults on wing from October to November.

The larvae feed on Opuntia basilaris, Opuntia ficus-indica, Opuntia macrorhiza var. macrorhiza, Opuntia atrispina, Opuntia phaeacantha, Opuntia polyacantha and Opuntia violaceae var. macrocentra. Mature larvae are white with light purple cross-bands.
