= Cactobrosis =

Scientific classification
- Kingdom: Animalia
- Phylum: Arthropoda
- Clade: Pancrustacea
- Class: Insecta
- Order: Lepidoptera
- Family: Pyralidae
- Tribe: Phycitini
- Genus: Cactobrosis; Dyar, 1914

Genus of moths

Cactobrosis is a genus of snout moths in the subfamily Phycitinae. It was erected by Harrison Gray Dyar Jr. in 1914. Some sources list it as a synonym of Zophodia, while others retain it as a valid genus.

== Species ==
- Cactobrosis fernaldialis (Hulst, 1886)
- Cactobrosis insignatella Dyar, 1914
- Cactobrosis longipennella (Hampson, 1901)
- Cactobrosis maculifera Dyar, 1914
