= Tucumania =

Scientific classification
- Kingdom: Animalia
- Phylum: Arthropoda
- Class: Insecta
- Order: Lepidoptera
- Family: Pyralidae
- Tribe: Phycitini
- Genus: Tucumania; Dyar, 1925

Genus of moths

Tucumania is a genus of snout moths in the subfamily Phycitinae. It was described by Harrison Gray Dyar Jr. in 1925. Some sources list it as a synonym of Zophodia, while others retain it as a valid genus.

== Species ==
- Tucumania porrecta Dyar, 1925
- Tucumania tapiacola Dyar, 1925
