= Zophodia transilis =

Scientific classification
- Domain: Eukaryota
- Kingdom: Animalia
- Phylum: Arthropoda
- Class: Insecta
- Order: Lepidoptera
- Family: Pyralidae
- Genus: Zophodia
- Species: Z. transilis

Binomial name
- Zophodia transilis (Heinrich, 1939)

Synonyms
- Sigelgaita transilis Heinrich, 1939

Species of moth

Zophodia transilis is a species of snout moth in the genus Zophodia. It was described by Carl Heinrich in 1939. It is found in Peru.

The wingspan is about 25 mm.

The larvae feed on Trichocereus species. They feed on and within the fruit of their host plant. The larvae are green.
