= Zophodia brevistrigella =

Scientific classification
- Domain: Eukaryota
- Kingdom: Animalia
- Phylum: Arthropoda
- Class: Insecta
- Order: Lepidoptera
- Family: Pyralidae
- Genus: Zophodia
- Species: Z. brevistrigella

Binomial name
- Zophodia brevistrigella Ragonot, 1888

Species of moth

Zophodia brevistrigella is a species of snout moth in the genus Zophodia found in Brazil. It was described by Émile Louis Ragonot in 1888.
