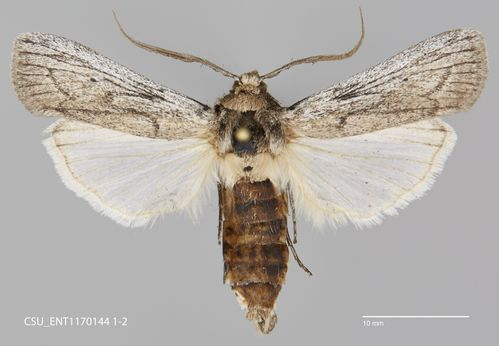

Scientific classification
- Kingdom: Animalia
- Phylum: Arthropoda
- Class: Insecta
- Order: Lepidoptera
- Family: Pyralidae
- Genus: Alberada
- Species: A. parabates

Binomial name
- Alberada parabates (Dyar, 1913)

Synonyms
- Melitara parabates Dyar, 1913; Zophodia parabates

= Alberada parabates =

Species of moth

Alberada parabates is a species of snout moth in the genus Alberada. It was described by Harrison Gray Dyar Jr. in 1913, and is known in North America from Arizona, California, Colorado, New Mexico, Oklahoma, Texas and Mexico.

The wingspan is 35–45 mm for males and 36–48 mm for females. The forewings are fuscous with the area between the lower vein of the cell and the costal margin and from the antemedial to subterminal lines heavily dusted with white. The area between the lower vein of the cell and the inner margin and from the base to the subterminal line is suffused with ocherous fuscous. The hindwings are white and semihyaline. The costal margin is bordered with fuscous.

The larvae feed on Cylindropuntia species, including Cylindropuntia imbricata.
