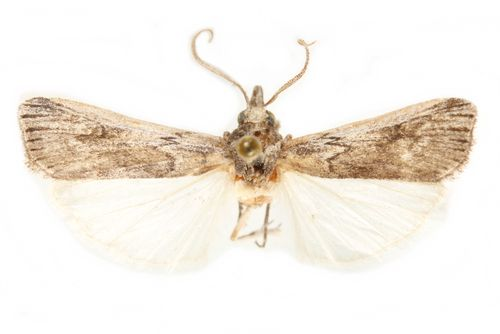

Scientific classification
- Domain: Eukaryota
- Kingdom: Animalia
- Phylum: Arthropoda
- Class: Insecta
- Order: Lepidoptera
- Family: Pyralidae
- Genus: Melitara
- Species: M. apicigrammella

Binomial name
- Melitara apicigrammella Blanchard & Knudson, 1985

Synonyms
- Zophodia apicigrammella

= Melitara apicigrammella =

Species of moth

Melitara apicigrammella is a species of snout moth in the genus Melitara. It was described by André Blanchard and Edward C. Knudson in 1985 and is found in the US state of Texas.

Adults are on wing from April to June and from August to September.
