= Eremberga insignis =

Scientific classification
- Kingdom: Animalia
- Phylum: Arthropoda
- Clade: Pancrustacea
- Class: Insecta
- Order: Lepidoptera
- Family: Pyralidae
- Genus: Eremberga
- Species: E. insignis

Binomial name
- Eremberga insignis Heinrich, 1939

Synonyms
- Zophodia insignis

Species of moth

Eremberga insignis is a species of snout moth, family Pyralidae. It was described by Carl Heinrich in 1939. It is found in Mexico (San Luis Potosí, Sierra Tarahumara) and Texas (USA).

== Description ==
The wingspan is about 35 mm. The forewings are very faintly dusted with white on the costal half. The lower half of the wing is faintly shaded with dull luteous (muddy yellowish) ocherous.

== Ecology ==
Adults are on wing in July and in September–October; the latter applies to the Big Bend National Park (West Texas) where Eremberga insignis is not uncommon.
