= Ozamia punicans =

Scientific classification
- Domain: Eukaryota
- Kingdom: Animalia
- Phylum: Arthropoda
- Class: Insecta
- Order: Lepidoptera
- Family: Pyralidae
- Genus: Ozamia
- Species: O. punicans

Binomial name
- Ozamia punicans Heinrich, 1939

Synonyms
- Zophodia punicans

Species of moth

Ozamia punicans is a species of snout moth in the genus Ozamia. It was described by Carl Heinrich in 1939. It is found in Argentina and possibly southern Brazil.

The wingspan is 36–44 mm.
