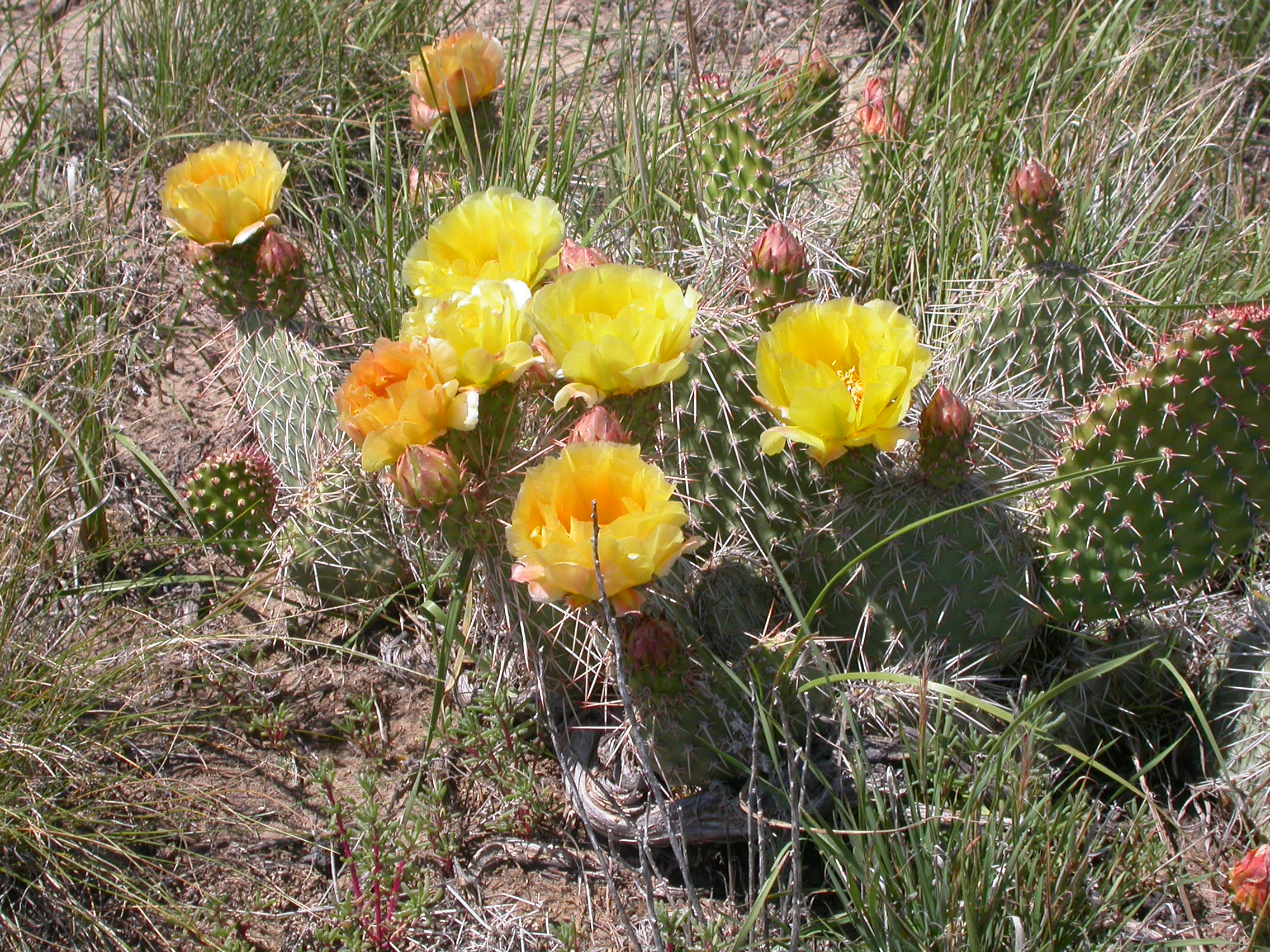

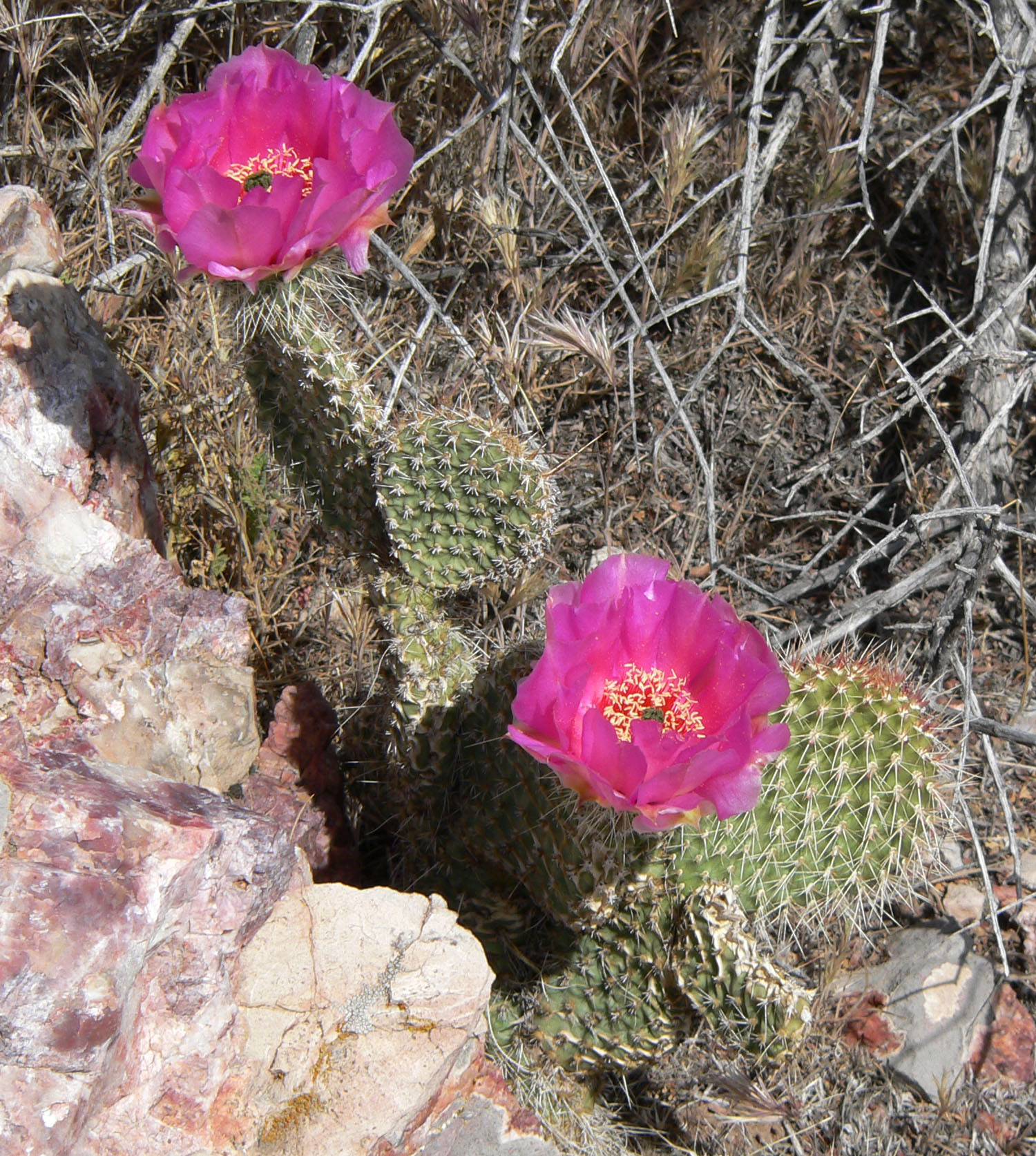

Conservation status
- Least Concern (IUCN 3.1)

- Secure (NatureServe)

Scientific classification
- Kingdom: Plantae
- Clade: Tracheophytes
- Clade: Angiosperms
- Clade: Eudicots
- Order: Caryophyllales
- Family: Cactaceae
- Genus: Opuntia
- Species: O. polyacantha

Binomial name
- Opuntia polyacantha Haw.
- Opuntia polyacantha range map, estimated with the iNaturalist Geomodel, 2025

= Opuntia polyacantha =

Species of cactus

Opuntia polyacantha is a common species of cactus known by the common names plains pricklypear, starvation pricklypear, hairspine cactus, and panhandle pricklypear.

== Description ==
Opuntia polyacantha grows up to 10–30 centimetres (4–12 in) tall. It forms low mats of pads which may be 2–3 m (6 1/2–9 7/8 ft) wide. Its succulent green pads are oval or circular and reach 27 by 18 cm (10 5/8 by 7 1/8 in) wide. Its areoles are tipped with woolly brown fibers and glochids. Many of the areoles have spines which are quite variable in size and shape. They may be 0.4 to 18.5 cm (1/8 to 7 1/4 in) in length, stout or thin, straight or curling, and any of a variety of colors.

Flowers grow from spine-covered stem segments which are shaped like semi-flattened pears. The flowers are 2.5 to 4 cm (1 to 1 5/8 in) long and may be yellow, magenta, or red in color (tending to turn pink or orange with age). The fruit is cylindrical, brownish, dry and spiny. The cactus reproduces by seed, by layering, and by re-sprouting from detached segments. In its natural range it survives throughout an immense range of temperatures, ranging from −46 °C (−50 °F) in the Yukon Territory, Canada, to well above 38 °C (100 °F) in places like Chihuahua, Mexico.

== Distribution and habitat ==
It is native to North America, where it is widespread in Western Canada, the Great Plains, the central and Western United States, and Chihuahua in northern Mexico. In 2018, a disjunct population was discovered in the Thousand Islands region of Ontario, Canada. This cactus grows in a wide variety of habitat types, including sagebrush, Ponderosa pine forest, prairie, savanna, shrublands, shrubsteppe, chaparral, pinyon-juniper woodland, and scrub. Individual plants tend to thrive in sandy soil. A new plant can grow from a displaced stem segment.

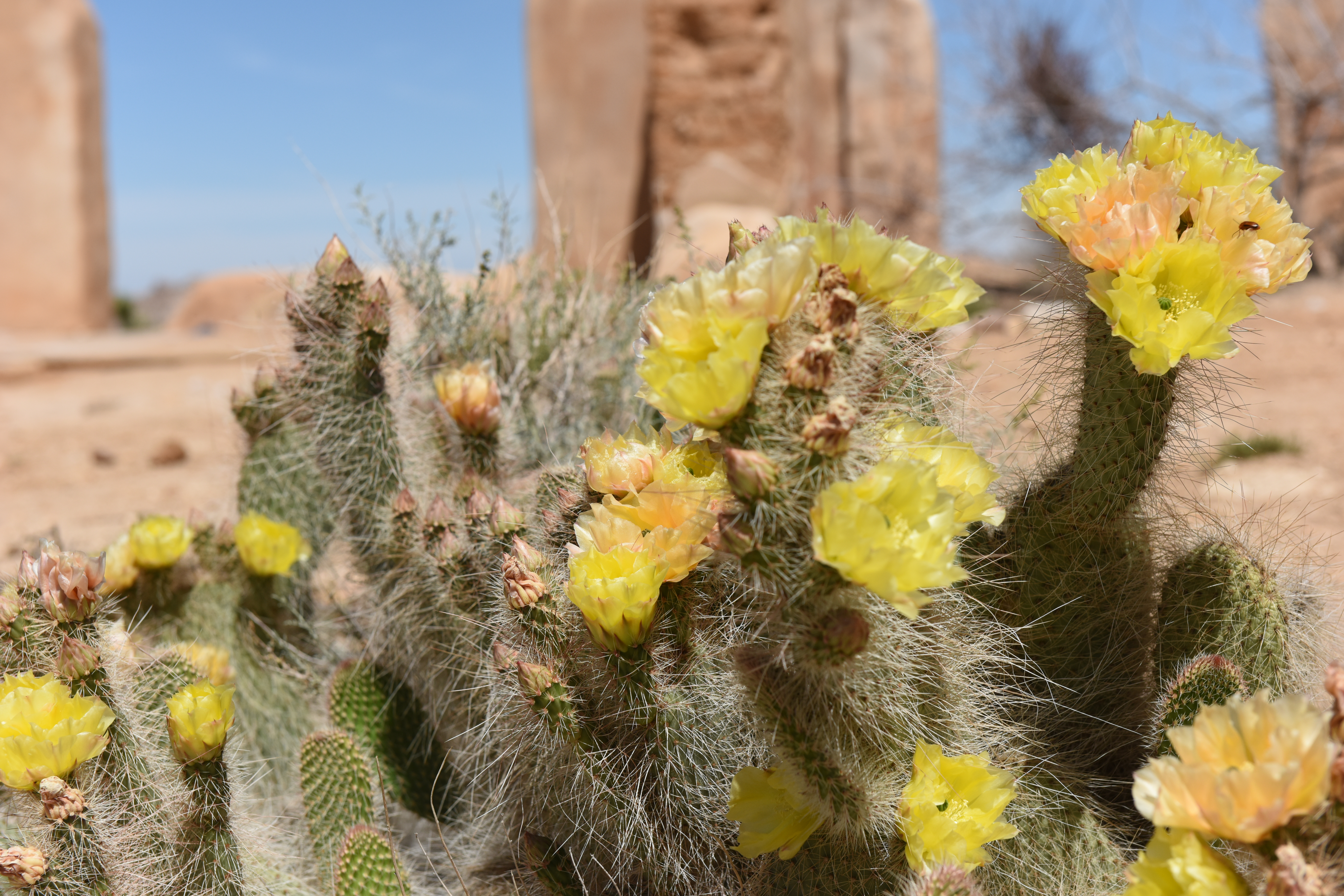
var. erinacea

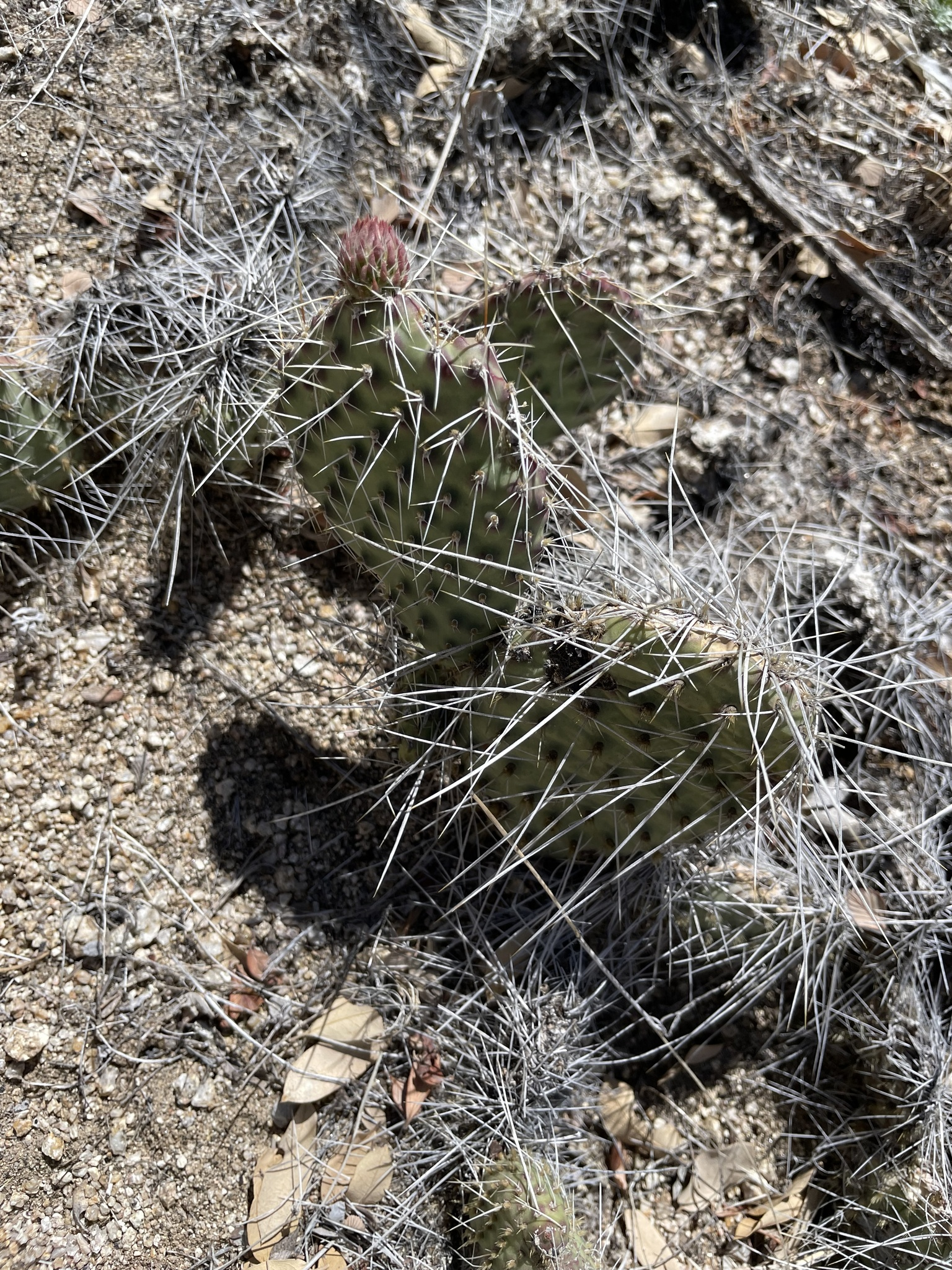
var. hystricina

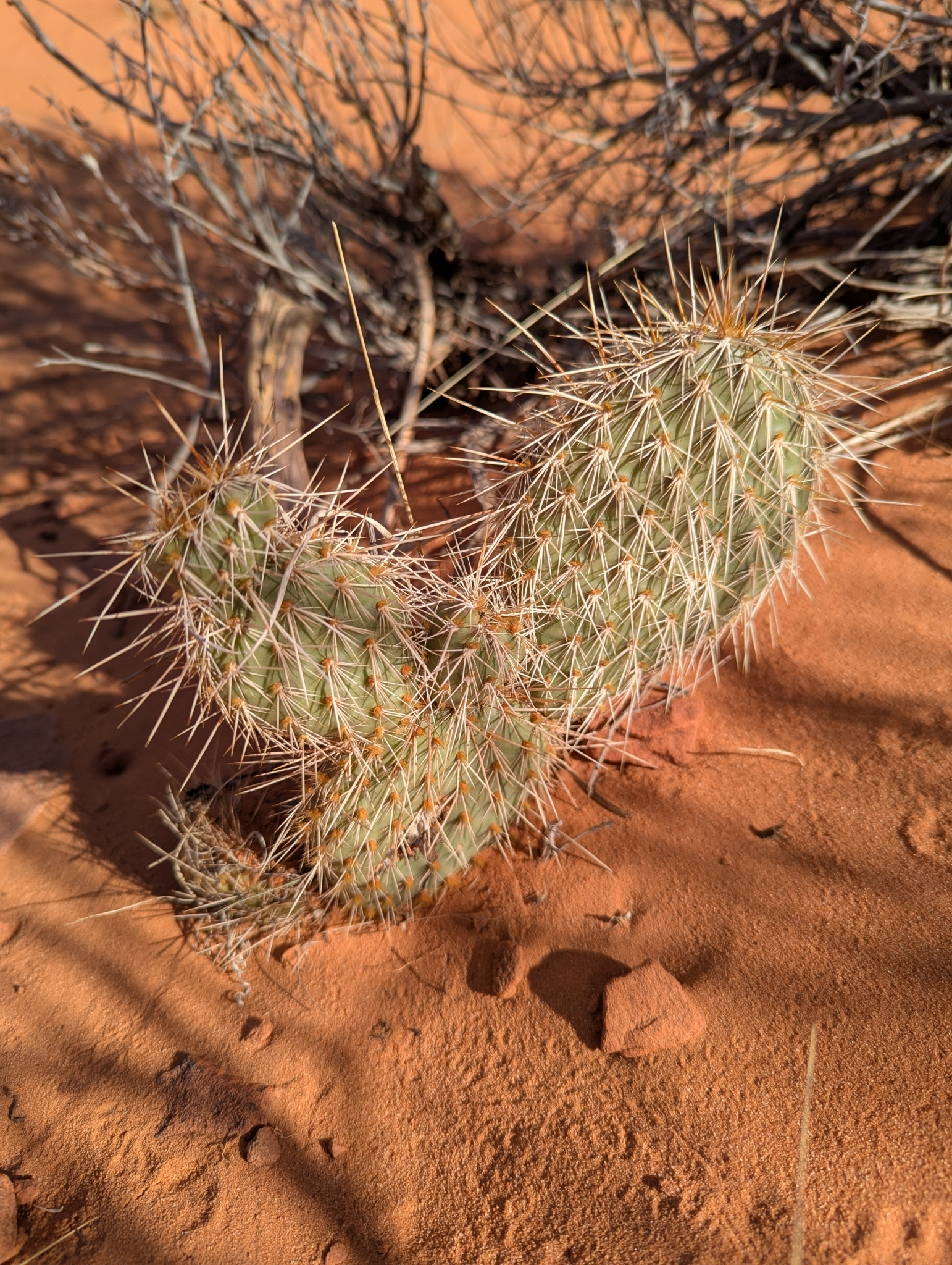
var. nicholii

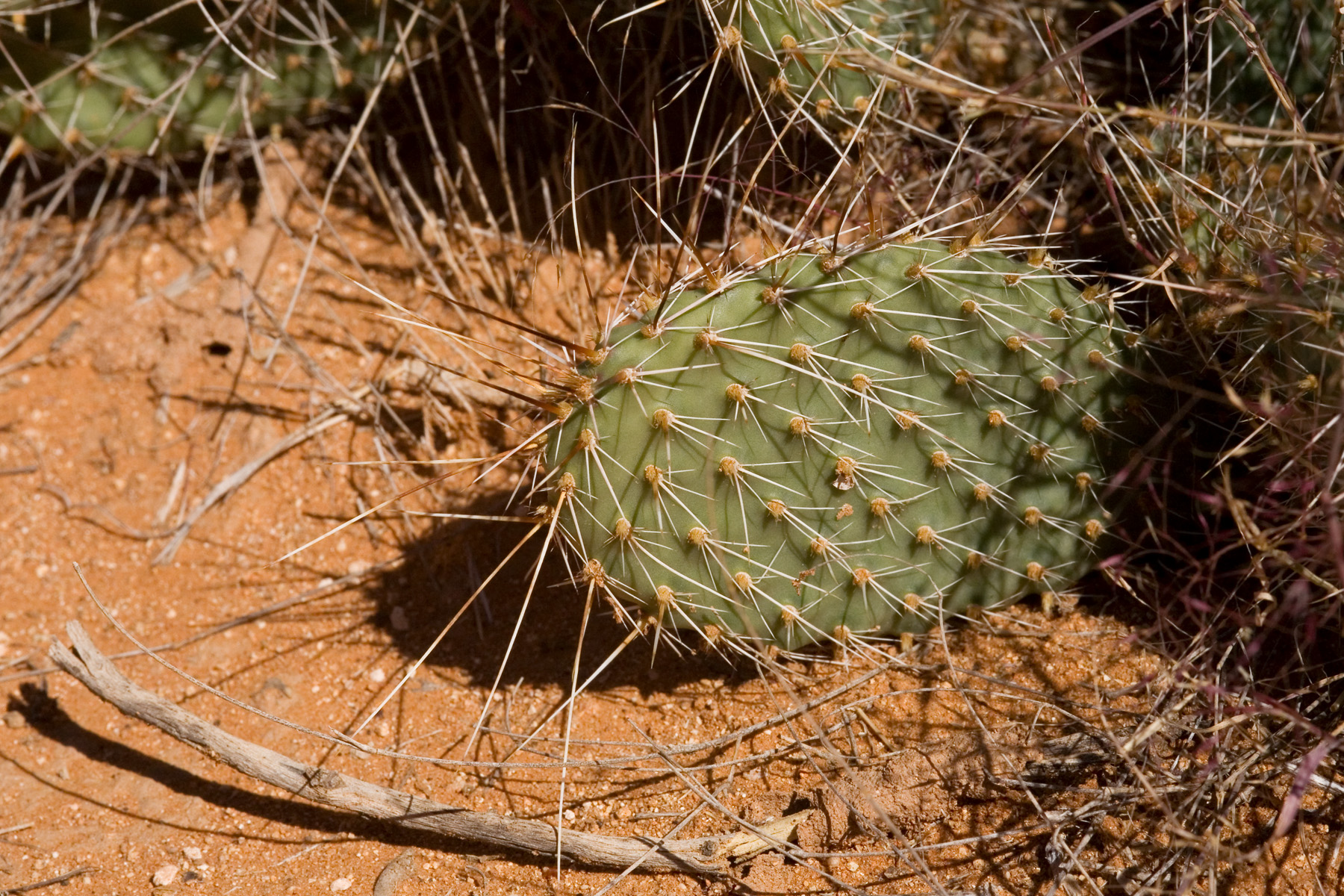
var. polyacantha

subspecies of Opuntia polyacantha

== Uses ==
Native Americans used it as a medicinal plant, with different parts treating various symptoms.

This pricklypear provides food for many types of animals. It provides over half the winter food for the black-tailed prairie dog in one area. Pronghorn antelope eat it, especially after the spines are burned off in wildfires. Ranchers intentionally burn stands of the plant to make it palatable for livestock when little other food is available. It will also grow in waste areas where good forage will not take hold. In fact, an abundance of the cactus indicates land that is poor in quality.

Several insects attack the cactus, including the cactus moth Melitara dentata, the blue cactus borer Olycella subumbrella, and the cactus bug Chelinidea vittiger.

O. polyacantha provided the Lewis and Clark Expedition with opportunity for admiration and more often complaint about the plant.

With the skin and seeds removed, the fruit can be eaten raw or made into candy.

== Varieties ==
There are many expressions of O. polyacantha and variation is common. Multiple varieties have been proposed. Some are accepted by modern authorities and some require further study. An incomplete list of proposed varieties includes:

- Opuntia polyacantha arenaria Engelmann & J.M. Bigelow, 1998
- Opuntia polyacantha erinacea Engelmann & J.M. Bigelow, 1998
- Opuntia polyacantha hystricina Engelmann & J.M. Bigelow, 1998
- Opuntia polyacantha juniperina Britton & Rose, 1969
- Opuntia polyacantha nicholii (L.D. Benson, 1950)
- Opuntia polyacantha polyacantha Haworth, 1819
- Opuntia polyacantha rhodantha (K. Schumann, 1896)
- Opuntia polyacantha schweriniana (K. Schumann, 1896)
- Opuntia polyacantha utahensis Parfitt, 1998
