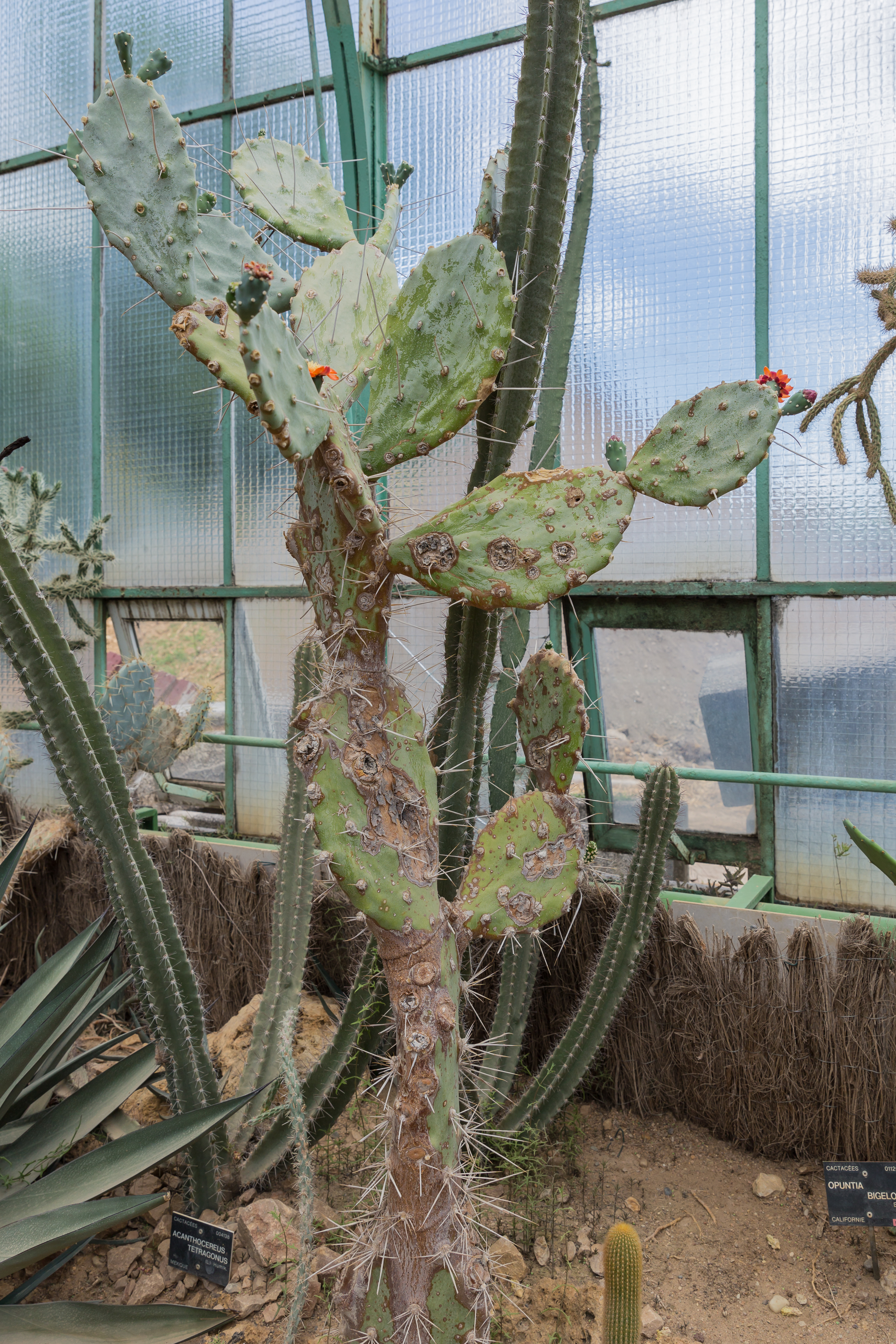
- Opuntia quimilo at the Jardin botanique de Lyon, in France.

Conservation status
- Least Concern (IUCN 3.1)

Scientific classification
- Kingdom: Plantae
- Clade: Embryophytes
- Clade: Tracheophytes
- Clade: Angiosperms
- Clade: Eudicots
- Order: Caryophyllales
- Family: Cactaceae
- Genus: Opuntia
- Species: O. quimilo

Binomial name
- Opuntia quimilo K.Schum. 1898.

= Opuntia quimilo =

Species of tree cactus

Opuntia quimilo is a tree cactus and flowering plant species belonging to the Cactaceae family. It is found in north-central Argentina and is widespread in Bolivia.

== Description ==
Opuntia quimilo grows as a multi-branched tree with a clearly identifiable stem, reaching a height of up to ten meters. The large, elliptical to oblong sections are glossy, greenish-grey, and measure up to 50 centimeters long, 25 centimeters wide, and 2 to 3 cm thick. The flowers, which are red or orange, are up to 7 centimeters in diameter. The fruits are pear-shaped to spherical, greenish-yellow, and 5–7 cm long.

== Ecology ==
It is pollinated by bees of the genera: Arhysosage, Augochloropsis, Megachile, Lithurgus, Xylocopa, Tetrapedia, Melipona and the species Ptilothrix tricolor, Diadasia patagonica, Bombus morio, Apis mellifera and Polybia ignobilis. It is also pollinated by hummingbird species Heliomaster furcifer and Chlorostilbon lucidus.

It is assessed as "Least Concern" by the International Union for Conservation of Nature Red List.

== Taxonomy ==
Opuntia quimilo was described by Karl Moritz Schumann and published in Gesamtbeschreibung der Kakteen 746. 1898.

== Etymology ==
Opuntia: generic name coming from the Greek used by Pliny the Elder for a plant that grew around the city of Opus in Greece.

quimilo: epithet derived from the common name "quimilo" used by locals to describe the species.
