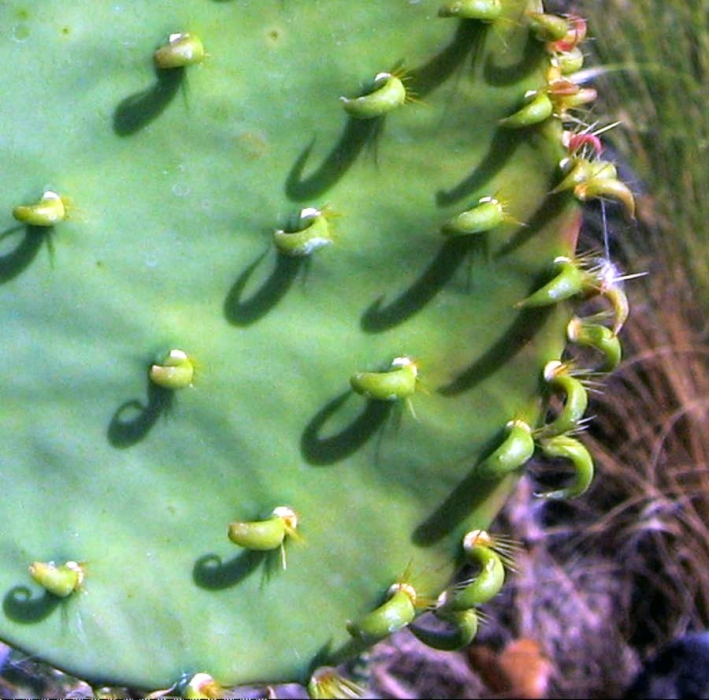

Scientific classification
- Kingdom: Plantae
- Clade: Tracheophytes
- Clade: Angiosperms
- Clade: Eudicots
- Order: Caryophyllales
- Family: Cactaceae
- Genus: Opuntia
- Species: O. cacanapa

Binomial name
- Opuntia cacanapa Griffiths & Hare

= Opuntia cacanapa =

Species of cactus

Opuntia cacanapa is a cactus in the genus Opuntia. In the United States, it is found primarily in the southern Trans-Pecos and the South Texas Plains from Brewster, Pecos, and Uvalde Counties south to Cameron County. It also occurs in nearby Mexico from the Rio Grande to as far south as Guanajuato and northern Hidalgo.

== Details ==
The plants are variable in size but can form shrubby trees from 1 to 2 m tall. They grow intermixed with other shrubs and small trees, often on limestone-derived soils. The glaucous pads are pale and not dark green. Cladodes are 15 to 20 cm long and may be broadly elliptical, obovate, ovate, or most often circular. The flowers are a rich, canary yellow (rarely orange or red) and have a prominent green stigma. The leaves are notable because they recurve strongly.

'Ellisiana' is a special selection of O. cacanapa that has no spines and no glochids. Thus, it is smooth to the touch. It is moderately cold and hardy and is used in cactus gardens as far north as New Mexico, Oklahoma, and northern Virginia.

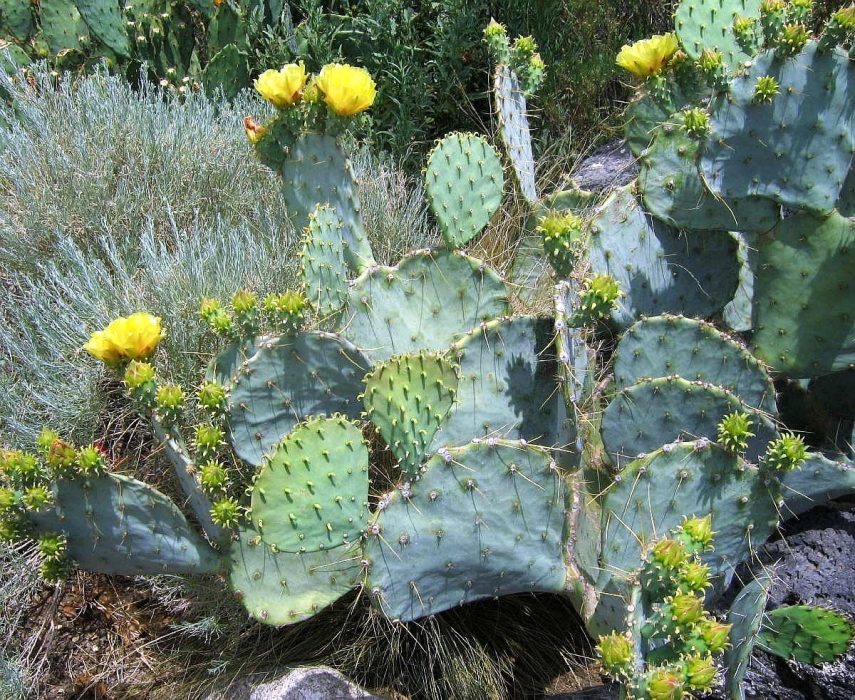
Opuntia cacanapa in flower
