= Eremberga leuconips =

Scientific classification
- Kingdom: Animalia
- Phylum: Arthropoda
- Class: Insecta
- Order: Lepidoptera
- Family: Pyralidae
- Genus: Eremberga
- Species: E. leuconips

Binomial name
- Eremberga leuconips (Dyar, 1925)

Synonyms
- Cactobrosis leuconips Dyar, 1925; Zophodia leuconips

Species of moth

Eremberga leuconips is a species of snout moth in the genus Eremberga. It was described by Harrison Gray Dyar Jr. in 1925 and is found in the US states of Arizona and California.

The wingspan is 27–37 mm for males and 26–37 mm for females.

The larvae feed on Echinocereus polyacanthus.
