= Eremberga creabates =

Scientific classification
- Kingdom: Animalia
- Phylum: Arthropoda
- Class: Insecta
- Order: Lepidoptera
- Family: Pyralidae
- Genus: Eremberga
- Species: E. creabates

Binomial name
- Eremberga creabates (Dyar, 1923)

Synonyms
- Olyca creabates Dyar, 1923; Zophodia creabates

Species of moth

Eremberga creabates is a species of snout moth in the genus Eremberga. It was described by Harrison Gray Dyar Jr. in 1923 and is found in the US state of California.

The wingspan is about 34 mm.
