= Cactobrosis longipennella =

Scientific classification
- Kingdom: Animalia
- Phylum: Arthropoda
- Class: Insecta
- Order: Lepidoptera
- Family: Pyralidae
- Genus: Cactobrosis
- Species: C. longipennella

Binomial name
- Cactobrosis longipennella (Hampson, 1901)

Synonyms
- Euzophera longipennella Hampson, 1901; Zophodia longipennella; Moodna elongatella Hampson, 1901

Species of moth

Cactobrosis longipennella is a species of snout moth in the genus Cactobrosis. It was described by George Hampson in 1901 and is found in Mexico.

The wingspan is 34–40 mm for males and 33–43 mm for females.

The larvae probably feed on Ferocactus species.
