= Tucumania porrecta =

Scientific classification
- Kingdom: Animalia
- Phylum: Arthropoda
- Class: Insecta
- Order: Lepidoptera
- Family: Pyralidae
- Genus: Tucumania
- Species: T. porrecta

Binomial name
- Tucumania porrecta Dyar, 1925

Synonyms
- Zophodia porrecta

Species of moth

Tucumania porrecta is a species of snout moth in the genus Tucumania. It was described by Harrison Gray Dyar Jr. in 1925. It is found in Uruguay.

The wingspan is 32–35 mm.

The larvae feed on Opuntia species. The larvae are deep red or purple red with small dark spots. Pupation takes place in a cocoon within the excavated segments of the host plant.
