= Ozamia thalassophila =

Scientific classification
- Domain: Eukaryota
- Kingdom: Animalia
- Phylum: Arthropoda
- Class: Insecta
- Order: Lepidoptera
- Family: Pyralidae
- Genus: Ozamia
- Species: O. thalassophila

Binomial name
- Ozamia thalassophila Dyar, 1925

Synonyms
- Zophodia thalassophila

Species of moth

Ozamia thalassophila is a species of snout moth in the genus Ozamia. It was described by Harrison Gray Dyar Jr. in 1925. It is found in the US state of California.

The wingspan is 28 mm. The forewings are dark grey with darker markings and the hindwings are white.

The larvae feed on Opuntia species, possibly the fruit of Opuntia prolifera.
