= Ozamia immorella =

Scientific classification
- Domain: Eukaryota
- Kingdom: Animalia
- Phylum: Arthropoda
- Class: Insecta
- Order: Lepidoptera
- Family: Pyralidae
- Genus: Ozamia
- Species: O. immorella

Binomial name
- Ozamia immorella (Dyar, 1913)

Synonyms
- Euzophera immorella Dyar, 1913; Zophodia immorella

Species of moth

Ozamia immorella is a species of snout moth in the genus Ozamia. It was described by Harrison Gray Dyar Jr. in 1913. It is found in Mexico.

The wingspan is 25–31 mm. The forewings are dark grey with darker markings and a faint purplish-red suffusion over the ground colour. The hindwings are white.

The larvae feed on Opuntia species. They feed on the fruit of their host plant.
