= Yosemitia graciella =

Scientific classification
- Domain: Eukaryota
- Kingdom: Animalia
- Phylum: Arthropoda
- Class: Insecta
- Order: Lepidoptera
- Family: Pyralidae
- Genus: Yosemitia
- Species: Y. graciella

Binomial name
- Yosemitia graciella (Hulst, 1887)

Synonyms
- Spermatophthora graciella Hulst, 1887; Zophodia graciella; Zophodia longipennella Hulst, 1888; Yosemitia longipennella

Species of moth

Yosemitia graciella is a species of snout moth in the genus Yosemitia. It was described by George Duryea Hulst in 1887. It is found in the US states of Arizona, California, Nevada, Colorado, New Mexico and Texas.

Adults are on wing from March to July.

The larvae feed on Echinocereus viridiflorus, Echinocereus polyacanthus, Coryphantha aggregaia and Sclerocactus polyancistrus. The larvae are gregarious internal feeders.
