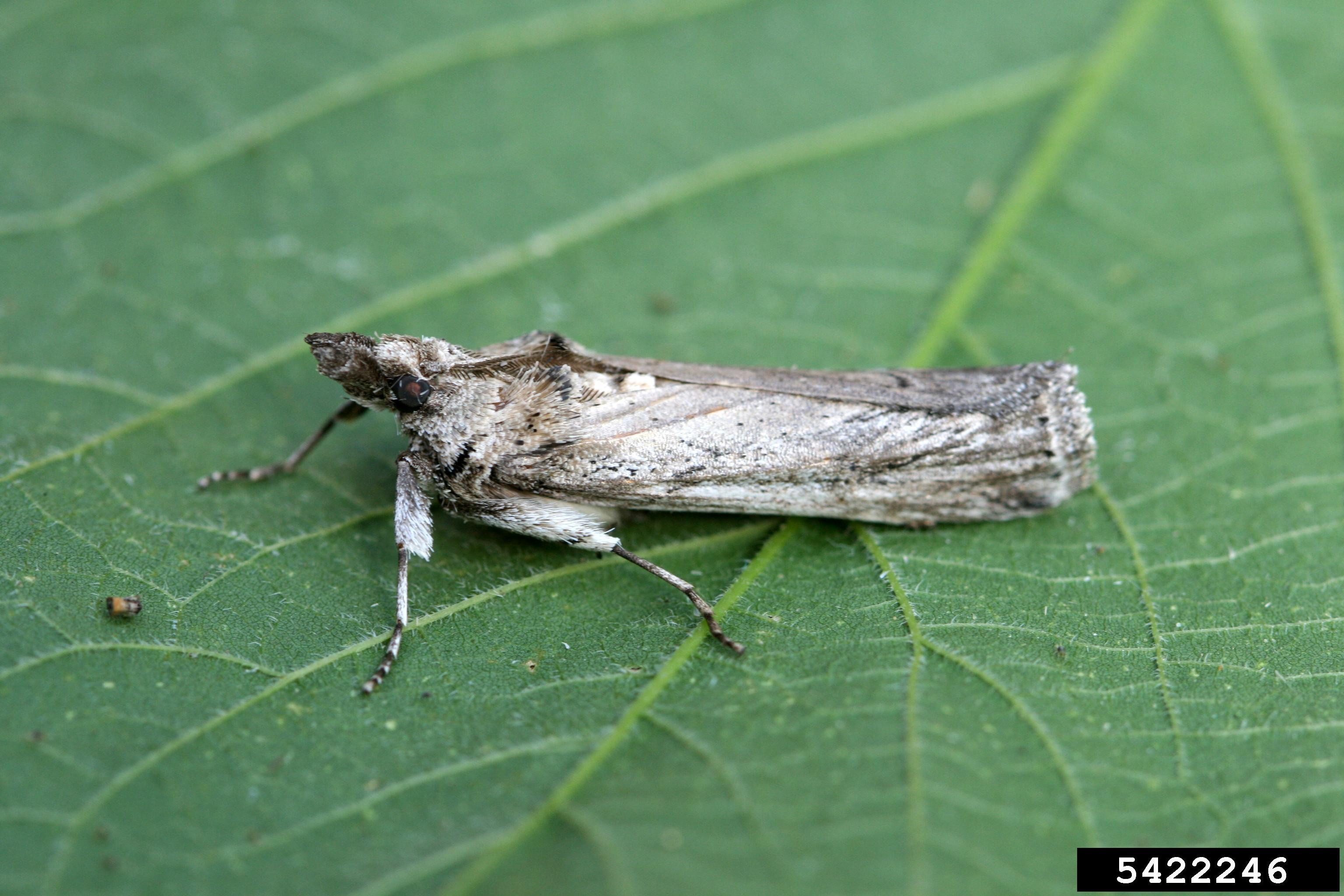

Scientific classification
- Kingdom: Animalia
- Phylum: Arthropoda
- Class: Insecta
- Order: Lepidoptera
- Family: Pyralidae
- Genus: Melitara
- Species: M. dentata

Binomial name
- Melitara dentata (Grote, 1876)

Synonyms
- Zophodia dentata Grote, 1876

= Melitara dentata =

Species of moth

Melitara dentata, the North American cactus moth, is a moth of the family Pyralidae. The species was first described by Augustus Radcliffe Grote in 1876. It is native to western North America, where it is widespread from Alberta to southern Arizona and central Texas. It is an introduced species in Hawaii.

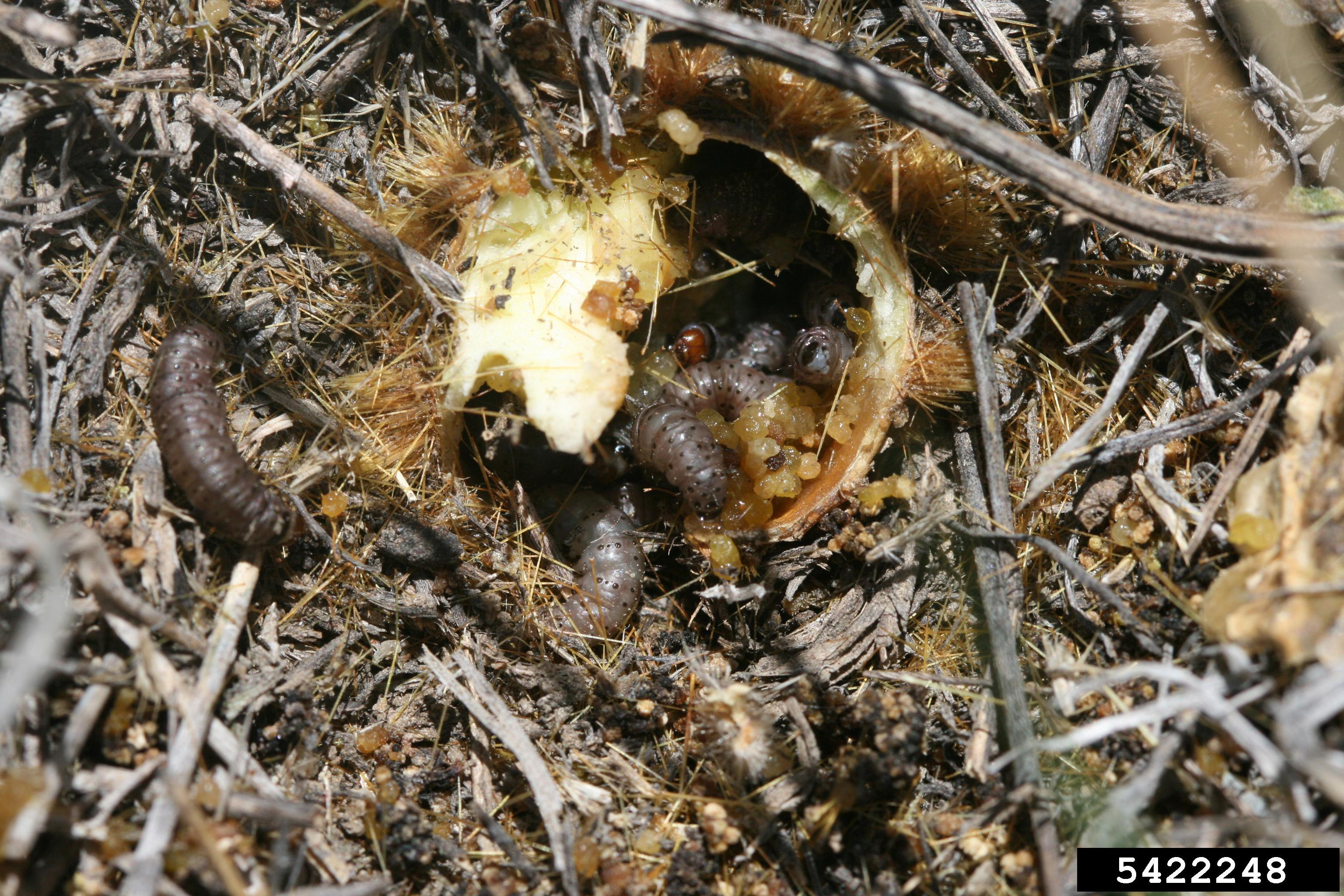
Larva

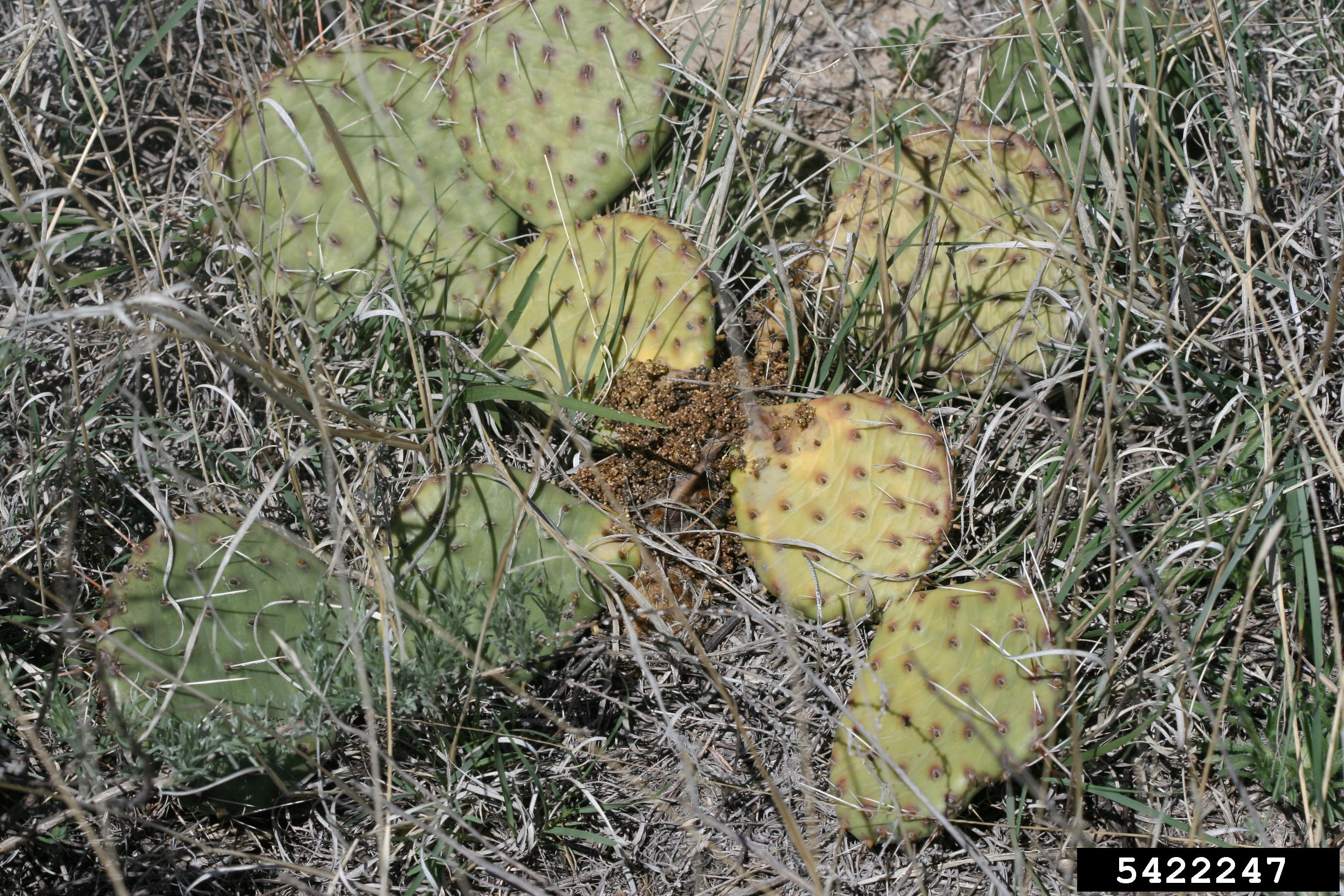
Damage on Opuntia cymochila

The wingspan is 32–50 mm.

There is one generation per year.

The larvae feed on Opuntia species, including Opuntia fragilis, Opuntia macrorhiza and Opuntia polyacantha. Pupation takes place in the silk cases.
