= Tucumania tapiacola =

Scientific classification
- Kingdom: Animalia
- Phylum: Arthropoda
- Class: Insecta
- Order: Lepidoptera
- Family: Pyralidae
- Genus: Tucumania
- Species: T. tapiacola

Binomial name
- Tucumania tapiacola Dyar, 1925

Synonyms
- Zophodia tapiacola

Species of moth

Tucumania tapiacola is a species of snout moth in the genus Tucumania. It was described by Harrison Gray Dyar Jr. in 1925. It is found in Argentina and has been introduced to Australia and South Africa.

The wingspan is 24–34 mm. The forewings are soft grey, with a slightly darker pattern of markings. The hindwings are pearly white, but dusky toward the outer margin. The length of the life cycle is irregular, but both in Argentina and in Australia there are usually two complete generations and a third partial generation annually.

The larvae feed on Opuntia aurantiaca and Opuntia discolor. They are solitary and tunnel in the segments of their host plant, often transferring from one joint to another. The larvae are purplish or wine colored. Pupation takes place in a cocoon, spun either within the hollowed-out segments, among debris or just beneath the soil surface.
