= Ozamia lucidalis =

Scientific classification
- Kingdom: Animalia
- Phylum: Arthropoda
- Class: Insecta
- Order: Lepidoptera
- Family: Pyralidae
- Genus: Ozamia
- Species: O. lucidalis

Binomial name
- Ozamia lucidalis (Walker, 1863)

Synonyms
- Trachonitis lucidalis Walker, 1863; Zophodia lucidalis

Species of moth

Ozamia lucidalis is a species of snout moth in the family Pyralidae. It was first described by Francis Walker in 1863. It is found in the Caribbean (Hispaniola, Jamaica, Cuba), Mexico, and the United States (Florida Keys and Texas).

The wingspan is 26–30 mm. The forewings are brown gray with darker markings and the hindwings are white.

The larvae feed on Opuntia spinosissima and Opuntia dillenii. They feed on the fruit of their host plant. The larvae are dark gray. They have been recorded in February, April, June, August and November.
