= Yosemitia didactica =

Scientific classification
- Kingdom: Animalia
- Phylum: Arthropoda
- Class: Insecta
- Order: Lepidoptera
- Family: Pyralidae
- Genus: Yosemitia
- Species: Y. didactica

Binomial name
- Yosemitia didactica Dyar, 1915

Synonyms
- Zophodia didactica

Species of moth

Yosemitia didactica is a species of snout moth in the genus Yosemitia. It was described by Harrison Gray Dyar Jr. in 1915. It is found in southern Mexico.
