= Cactobrosis maculifera =

Scientific classification
- Domain: Eukaryota
- Kingdom: Animalia
- Phylum: Arthropoda
- Class: Insecta
- Order: Lepidoptera
- Family: Pyralidae
- Genus: Cactobrosis
- Species: C. maculifera

Binomial name
- Cactobrosis maculifera Dyar, 1914

Synonyms
- Zophodia maculifera

Species of moth

Cactobrosis maculifera is a species of snout moth in the genus Cactobrosis. It was described by Harrison Gray Dyar Jr. in 1914. It is found in Mexico.
