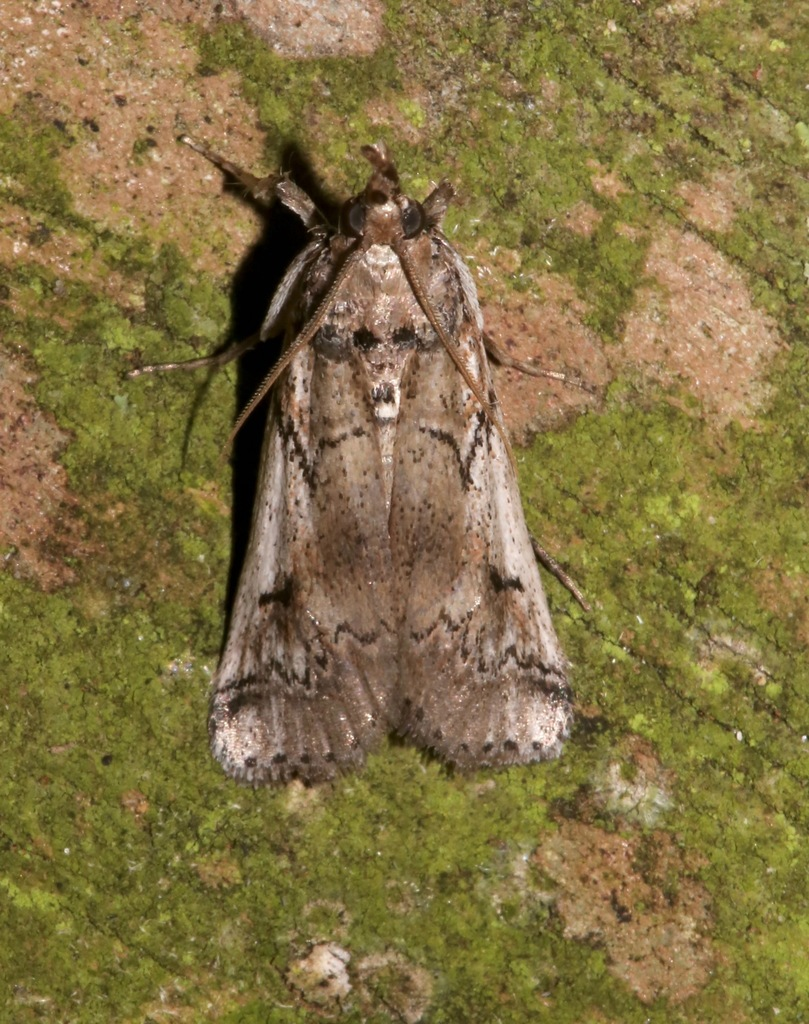

Scientific classification
- Kingdom: Animalia
- Phylum: Arthropoda
- Class: Insecta
- Order: Lepidoptera
- Family: Pyralidae
- Genus: Melitara
- Species: M. prodenialis

Binomial name
- Melitara prodenialis Walker, 1863

Synonyms
- Zophoidia prodenialis; Zophoidia bollii Zeller, 1872; Zophodia bollii Zeller, 1872

= Melitara prodenialis =

Species of moth

Melitara prodenialis is a moth of the family Pyralidae described by Francis Walker in 1863. It is native to North America, where it is known from south-eastern New York to Florida along the Atlantic coastal plain, and west to eastern Oklahoma and north-central and south-eastern Texas. It is an introduced species in Hawaii. It is a special concern species in Connecticut.

There are two generations per year throughout most of its range, but three generations in Florida. Adults are on wing from June to July and from September to October in Arkansas.

The larvae feed on Opuntia cladodes.
