= Cactobrosis fernaldialis =

Scientific classification
- Domain: Eukaryota
- Kingdom: Animalia
- Phylum: Arthropoda
- Class: Insecta
- Order: Lepidoptera
- Family: Pyralidae
- Genus: Cactobrosis
- Species: C. fernaldialis

Binomial name
- Cactobrosis fernaldialis (Hulst, 1886)

Synonyms
- Megaphycis fernaldialis Hulst, 1886; Zophodia fernaldialis; Euzophera gigantella Ragonot, 1901; Honora cinerella Hulst, 1901

Species of moth

Cactobrosis fernaldialis, the blue cactus borer, is a species of snout moth in the genus Cactobrosis. It was described by George Duryea Hulst in 1886, and is found from Texas to southern California, where it inhabits deserts.

The wingspan is 36–47 mm for males and 34–50 mm for females. Adults are on wing from late March to April and again from July to November.

The larvae feed on Ferocactus wislizeni.
