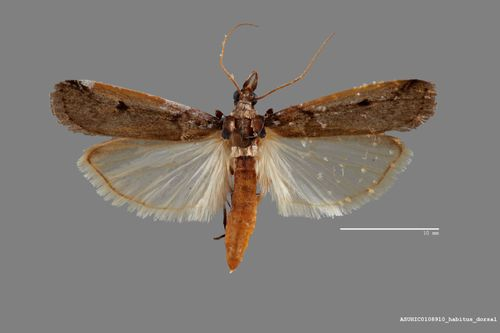

Scientific classification
- Kingdom: Animalia
- Phylum: Arthropoda
- Class: Insecta
- Order: Lepidoptera
- Family: Pyralidae
- Genus: Alberada
- Species: A. bidentella

Binomial name
- Alberada bidentella (Dyar, 1908)

Synonyms
- Zophodia bidentella Dyar, 1908; Eumysia bidentella; Zophodia holochlora Dyar, 1925

= Alberada bidentella =

Species of moth

Alberada bidentella is a species of snout moth in the genus Alberada. It was described by Harrison Gray Dyar Jr. in 1908, and is known from the south-western United States from Texas westward.

The wingspan is 20–24 mm for males and 19–23 mm for females.

The larvae feed within the stem of Cylindropuntia species.
