= Cactobrosis insignatella =

Scientific classification
- Kingdom: Animalia
- Phylum: Arthropoda
- Class: Insecta
- Order: Lepidoptera
- Family: Pyralidae
- Genus: Cactobrosis
- Species: C. insignatella

Binomial name
- Cactobrosis insignatella Dyar, 1914

Synonyms
- Zophodia insignatella

Species of moth

Cactobrosis insignatella is a species of snout moth in the genus Cactobrosis. It was described by Harrison Gray Dyar Jr. in 1914. It is found in Mexico.
