= Ozamia fuscomaculella =

Scientific classification
- Domain: Eukaryota
- Kingdom: Animalia
- Phylum: Arthropoda
- Class: Insecta
- Order: Lepidoptera
- Family: Pyralidae
- Genus: Ozamia
- Species: O. fuscomaculella

Binomial name
- Ozamia fuscomaculella (W. S. Wright, 1916)

Synonyms
- Euzophera fuscomaculella Wright, 1916; Zophodia fuscomaculella; Ozamia heliophila Dyar, 1925

Species of moth

Ozamia fuscomaculella is a species of snout moth in the genus Ozamia. It was described by William S. Wright in 1916. It is found in the US state of California.

Adults are on wing in July and August.

The larvae feed on Opuntia littoralis. They feed on the flowers and fruit of the host plant.

== Taxonomy ==
The former subspecies Ozamia fuscomaculella clarefacta has been raised to species status as Ozamia clarefacta.
