= Yosemitia fieldiella =

Scientific classification
- Kingdom: Animalia
- Phylum: Arthropoda
- Class: Insecta
- Order: Lepidoptera
- Family: Pyralidae
- Genus: Yosemitia
- Species: Y. fieldiella

Binomial name
- Yosemitia fieldiella (Dyar, 1913)

Synonyms
- Zophodia fieldiella Dyar, 1913

Species of moth

Yosemitia fieldiella is a species of snout moth in the genus Yosemitia. It was described by Harrison Gray Dyar Jr. in 1913. It is found in the US states of California and Arizona.
