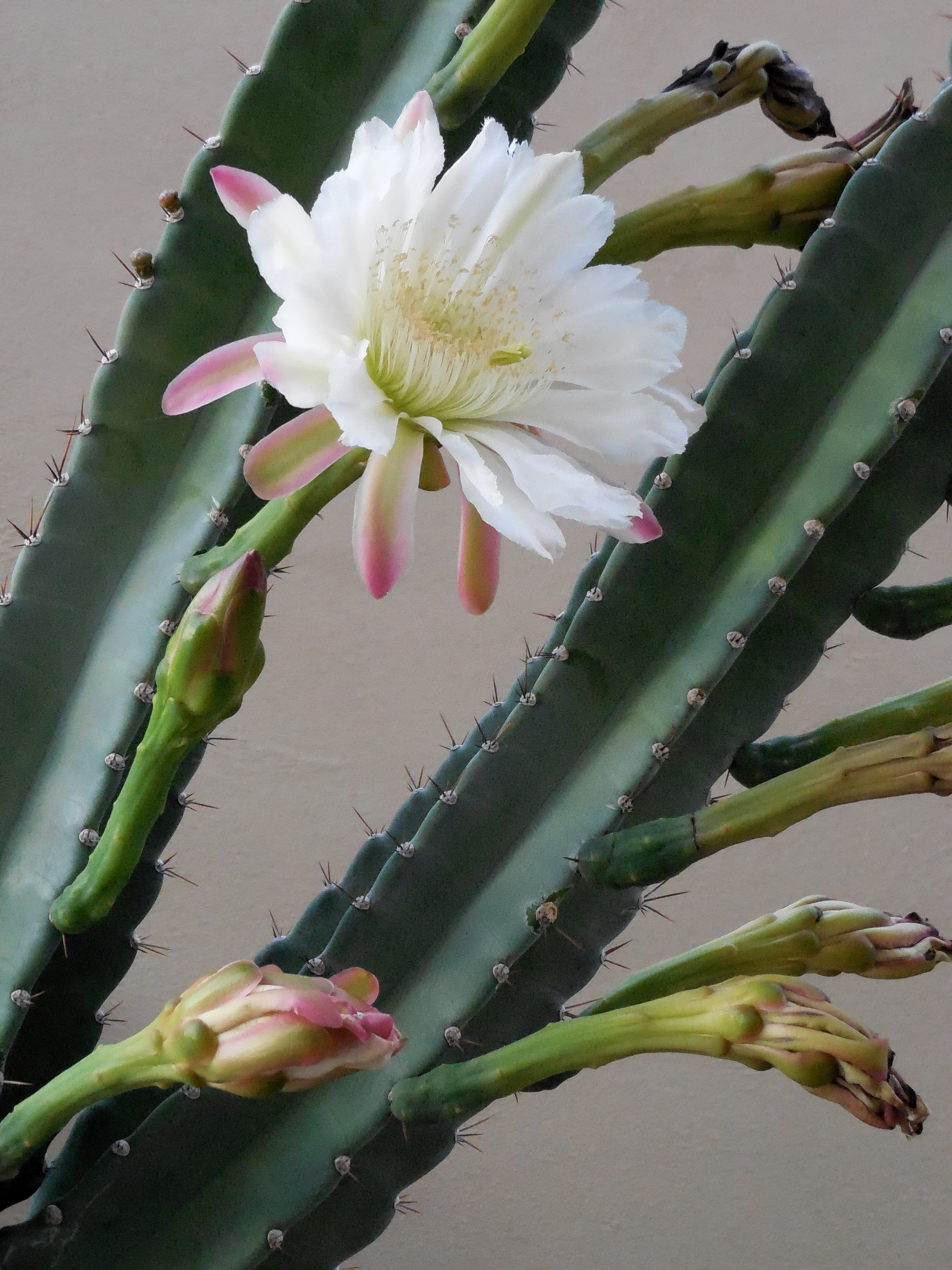

Scientific classification
- Kingdom: Plantae
- Clade: Tracheophytes
- Clade: Angiosperms
- Clade: Eudicots
- Order: Caryophyllales
- Family: Cactaceae
- Subfamily: Cactoideae
- Genus: Cereus
- Species: C. hildmannianus

Binomial name
- Cereus hildmannianus K.Schum.

Synonyms
- Of Cereus hildmannianus subsp. hildmannianus: Cactus abnormis Willd.; Cactus monstrosus Willd.; Cactus peruvianus var. monstruosus DC.; Cereus abnormis (Willd.) Sweet; Cereus alacriportanus Pfeiff.; Cereus alacriportanus var. bageanus (F.Ritter) P.J.Braun; Cereus bonariensis C.F.Först.; Cereus calvescens DC.; Cereus childsii Blanc; Cereus curvispinus Pfeiff.; Cereus hildmannianus subsp. xanthocarpus (K.Schum.) P.J.Braun & Esteves; Cereus milesimus Rost; Cereus monstrosus J.Forbes; Cereus monstrosus (DC.) Steud.; Cereus monstruosus K.Schum.; Cereus neonesioticus (F.Ritter) P.J.Braun; Cereus neonesioticus var. interior (F.Ritter) P.J.Braun; Cereus pentagonus C.F.Först.; Cereus peruvianus var. alacriportanus (Pfeiff.) K.Schum.; Cereus peruvianus var. monstrosus DC.; Cereus peruvianus var. ovicarpus Hertrich; Cereus peruvianus var. persicinus Werderm.; Cereus peruvianus var. proferrens Werderm.; Cereus peruvianus var. reclinatus Werderm.; Cereus validus Haw.; Cereus xanthocarpus K.Schum.; Piptanthocereus alacriportanus (Pfeiff.) F.Ritter; Piptanthocereus bageanus F.Ritter; Piptanthocereus neonesioticus F.Ritter; Piptanthocereus neonesioticus var. interior F.Ritter; Piptanthocereus peruvianus var. monstruosus (DC.) Riccob.; Piptanthocereus validus (Haw.) Riccob.; Piptanthocereus xanthocarpus (K.Schum.) F.Ritter; Of Cereus hildmannianus subsp. uruguayanus: Cereus uruguayanus F.Ritter ex R.Kiesling; Piptanthocereus uruguayanus F.Ritter

= Cereus hildmannianus =

Species of cactus

Cereus hildmannianus is a species of cactus from southern South America. Its distribution is uncertain but probably includes Brazil, Paraguay, Uruguay and Argentina. This cactus thrives in diverse habitats such as forests, savannas, and grasslands, preferring well-draining soils and demonstrating adaptability to both drought and occasional flooding.

== Description ==
Cereus hildmannianus has a tree-like growth habit with a distinct trunk after which it branches freely up to 10 m (33 ft) high. Its stems are up to 15 cm (6 in) across, have 4–6 ribs and are divided into segments. The cylindrical, segmented, blue-green to cloudy green shoots are often blue-green in colour when young, becoming duller green with age. Stems are usually spineless (except in subspecies uruguayensis). They have a diameter of up to 15 centimeters. There are four to six sharp-edged ribs that are up to 3.5 centimeters high. The areoles on it are small. Thorns are usually not formed.

=== Flowers ===
The white flowers are very large, up to 25–30 cm (10–12 in) long, and are followed by fruits which are red when ripe. Flowering appears when the plant is around 4 to 5 years old and is abundant during summer nights. The spherical fruits are colored red to yellow. They contain a white pulp.

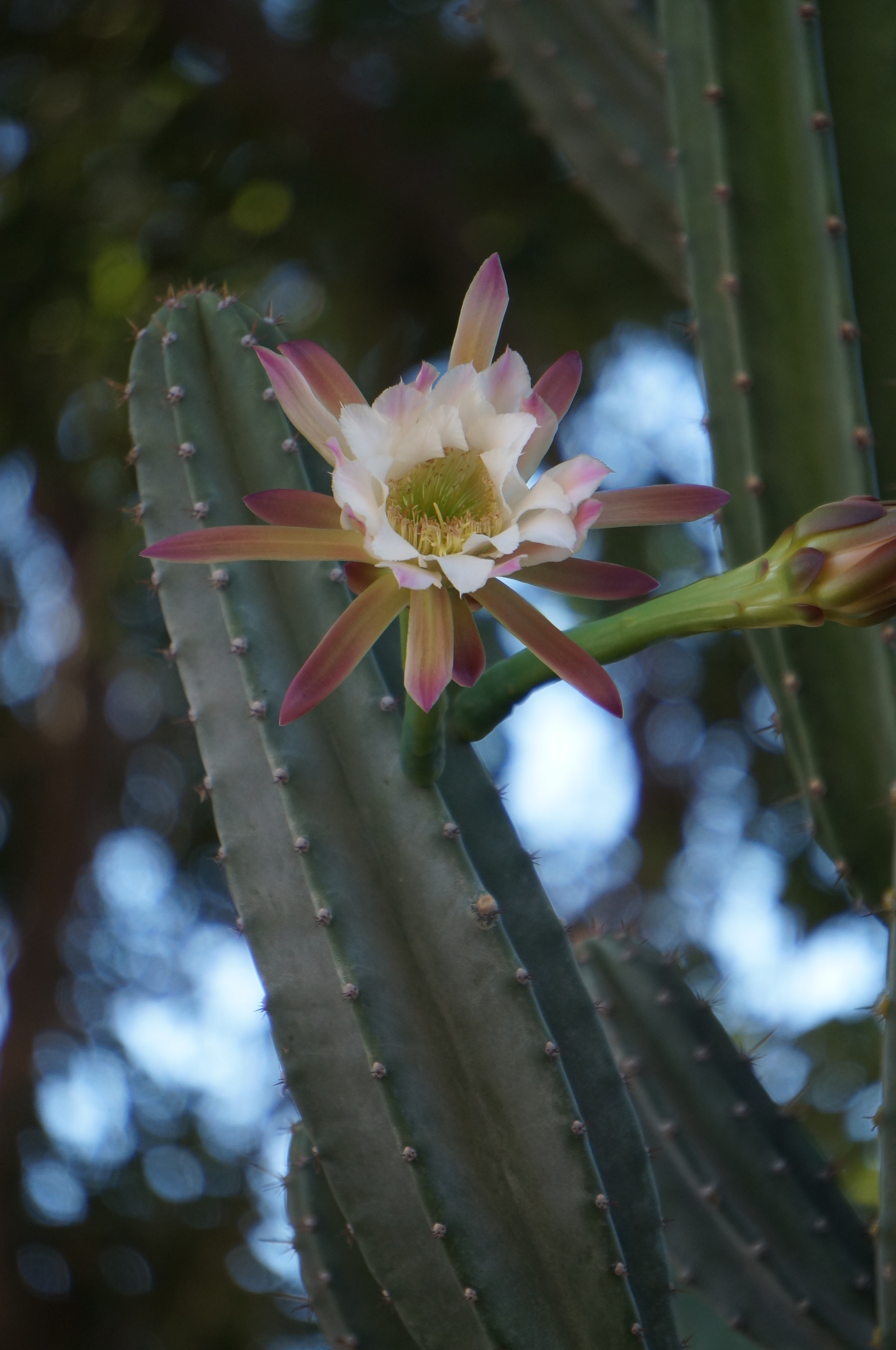
Flowering specimen

== Cultivation ==
It is necessary to water abundantly during the period of growth, and very little during the period of rest. The species can tolerate some cold, even a few degrees below zero, if the soil is dry. Young plants need shade, while adults need full sun.

== Distribution ==
Cereus hildmannianus is thought to be widespread in Brazil, Mato Grosso do Sul, Paraguay, Uruguay, Bolivia and Argentina.

It is found in sandy, rocky soils, outcrops and on cliffs. It eventually occurs as an epiphyte over trees and shrubs. It blooms from October to February. The flower is nocturnal and closes in the morning. All parts of the plant are edible by the fauna. In Rio Grande do Sul, it is used as an ornamental and the fruits are appreciated by the population. It is commonly used by birds to build nests.

== Systematics ==
Cereus hildmannianus was first named by Karl M. Schumann in 1890. Plants named as Cereus uruguayensis by Roberto Kiesling in 1982 were reduced to C. hildmannianus subsp. uruguayensis by Nigel P. Taylor in 1998, thereby creating the autonym C. hildmannianus subsp. hildmannianus. Subspecies hildmannianus has the same range as the species as a whole and is usually spineless, unlike subsp. uruguayensis which is only found in Uruguay.

Image	Scientific name	Distribution
	C. hildmannianus subsp. hildmannianus	Brazil, Paraguay, Uruguay and Argentina
	C. hildmannianus subsp. uruguayensis	Uruguay.
