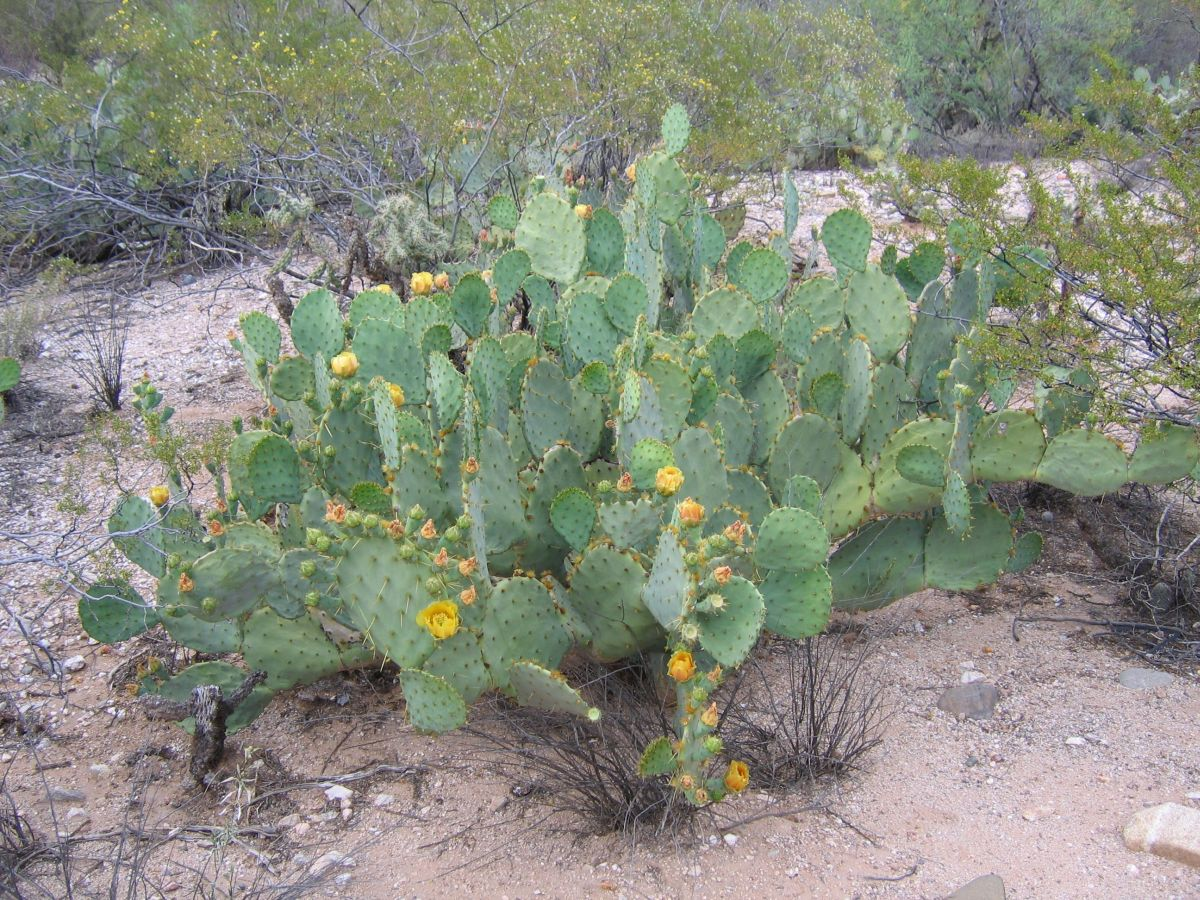

Scientific classification
- Kingdom: Plantae
- Clade: Tracheophytes
- Clade: Angiosperms
- Clade: Eudicots
- Order: Caryophyllales
- Family: Cactaceae
- Genus: Opuntia
- Species: O. lindheimeri

Binomial name
- Opuntia lindheimeri Engelm.

= Opuntia lindheimeri =

Species of cactus

Opuntia lindheimeri or Texas prickly pear is a species of cactus native to North America. It is native to Mexico and the United States, where its populations are primarily in Texas.

Widespread taxonomic confusion has prevented a clear understanding of the true range of this species, resulting in significant publication discrepancies regarding both its western and eastern boundaries. According to Opuntia Web group, this species is typically found in more mesic habitats with deeper soils.

== Taxonomy ==
The question of whether Opuntia lindheimeri should be treated as a full species or as a segregate of the closely related Opuntia engelmannii remains unsettled in the scientific community. Some treatments such as the early 20th century landmark monograph The Cactaceae consider is a segregated species, while others such as the Flora of North America confer it only variety status.

O. lindheimeri was first described as a species in 1850 by George Engelmann.

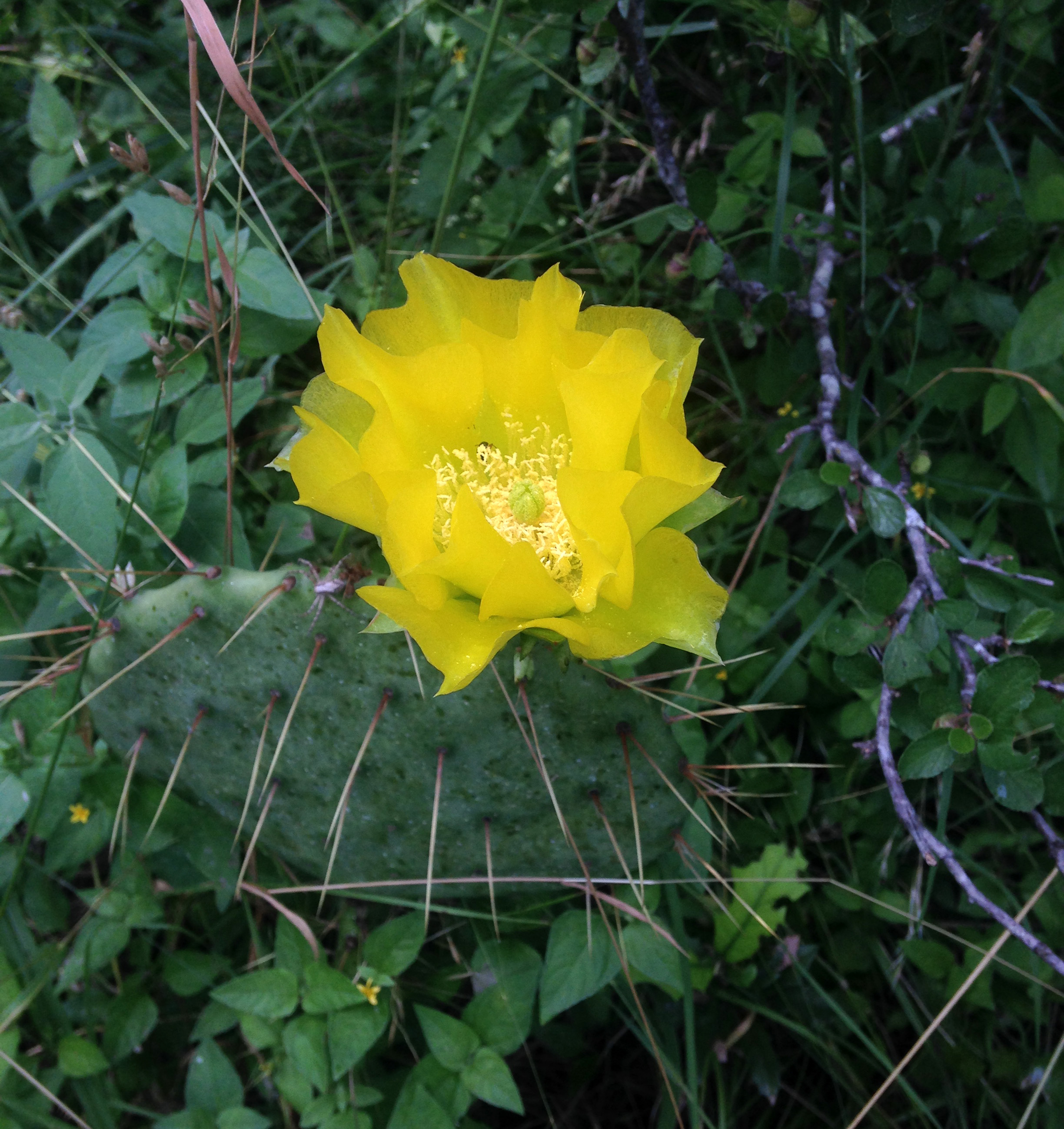
Detail of flower
