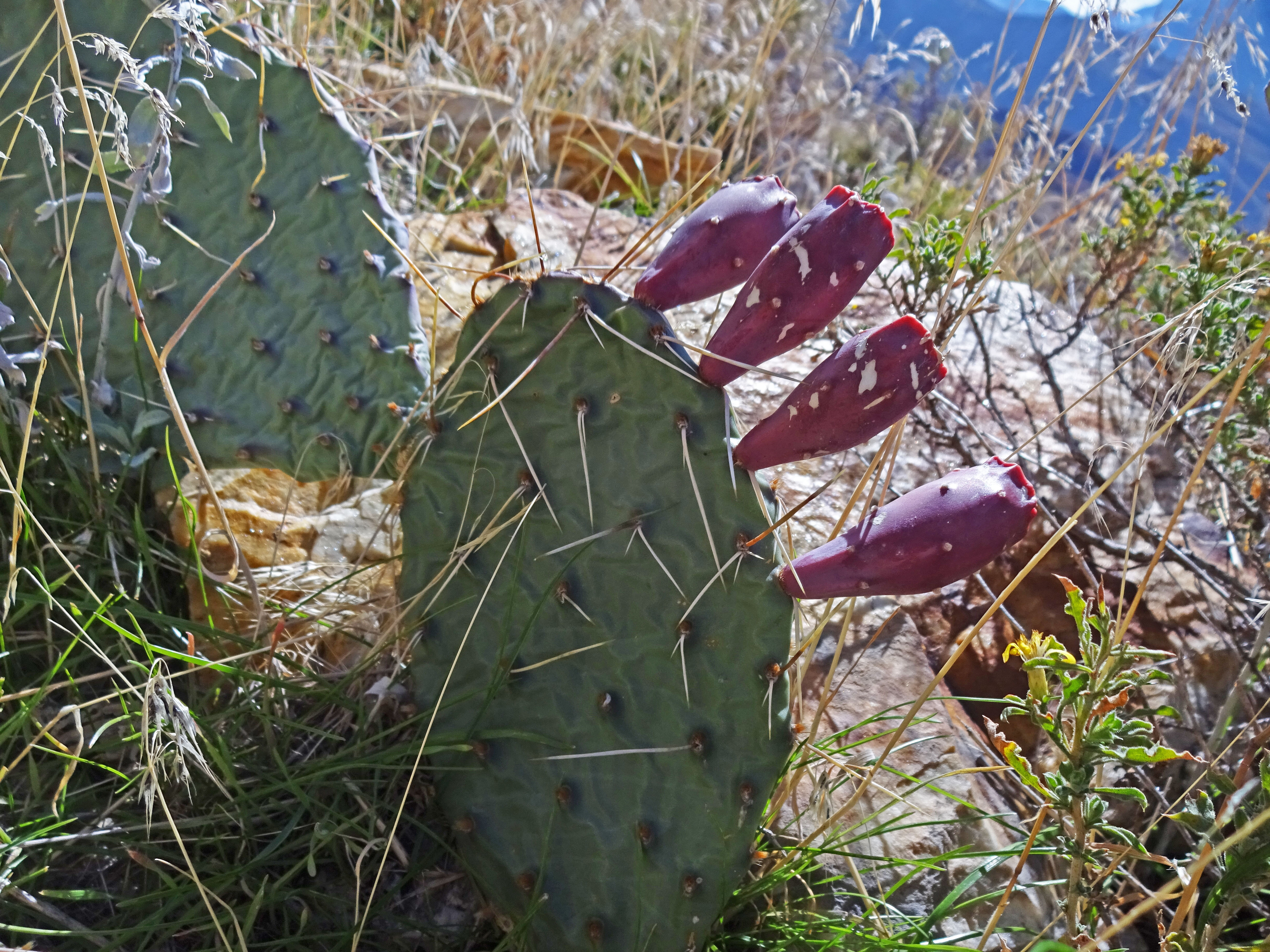

Conservation status
- Least Concern (IUCN 3.1)

- Secure (NatureServe)

Scientific classification
- Kingdom: Plantae
- Clade: Tracheophytes
- Clade: Angiosperms
- Clade: Eudicots
- Order: Caryophyllales
- Family: Cactaceae
- Genus: Opuntia
- Species: O. macrorhiza

Binomial name
- Opuntia macrorhiza Engelm.

Synonyms
- Synonymy: Cactus tuberculatus Willd.; Opuntia compressa var. macrorhiza (Engelm.) L.D.Benson; Opuntia compressa var. stenochila (Engelm. & J.M.Bigelow) D.Weniger; Opuntia fuscoatra Engelm.; Opuntia fusiformis Engelm. & J.M.Bigelow; Opuntia grandiflora (Engelm.) Small, nom. illeg. homonym. post.; Opuntia grandiflora Engelm.; Opuntia leptocarpa Mackensen; Opuntia loomisii Peebles; Opuntia macrorhiza var. grandiflora (Engelm.) Bulot; Opuntia macrorhiza var. greenei (J.M.Coult.) Bulot; Opuntia macrorhiza var. potosina R.E.M.Hern.; Opuntia mesacantha var. grandiflora Engelm.; Opuntia mesacantha var. greenii J.M.Coult.; Opuntia mesacantha var. macrorhiza (Engelm.) J.M.Coult.; Opuntia mesacantha var. stenochila (Engelm. & J.M.Bigelow) J.M.Coult.; Opuntia plumbea Rose; Opuntia rafinesquei var. fusiformis Engelm.; Opuntia rafinesquei var. grandiflora Engelm.; Opuntia roseana Mackensen; Opuntia seguina C.Z.Nelson; Opuntia stenochila Engelm. & J.M.Bigelow; Opuntia tuberculata (Willd.) Haw.; Opuntia xanthoglochia Griffiths

= Opuntia macrorhiza =

Species of cactus

Opuntia macrorhiza, also known as the prairie pricklypear, western pricklypear, twistpine pricklypear, or plains pricklypear (a name more commonly given to Opuntia polyacantha), is a common, widespread species of cactus native to North America.

== Description ==
O. macrorhiza is one of the shorter species of the genus, usually 7.5–12.5 cm (3.0–4.9 in) tall (but rarely over 30 cm (12 in)) and 30–180 cm (12–71 in) in diameter. O. macrorhiza grows horizontally to around 1 m (3.3 ft). forming wide clumps. Flowers are showy and bright yellow, often with red markings near the base of the petals. Fruits are narrow, red, juicy and edible.

== Distribution and habitat ==
The species prefers well-drained, sandy or gravelly soils, mostly in grassland areas. It grows at elevations of 600–2,400 m (2,000–7,900 ft). It is found throughout the Great Plains of the United States, from Texas to Minnesota, and west into the Rocky Mountain states to New Mexico, Utah, and perhaps Idaho, with sporadic populations in the Mississippi and Ohio Valleys. It is also reported from northern Mexico in the states of Chihuahua, Sonora, Coahuila, Nuevo León, Durango, Tamaulipas, and San Luís Potosí., though all Arizona and Mexican records should be considered with caution due to confusion with other similar species. The species is cultivated as an ornamental in other locations.

== Subdivisions ==
Some subspecies and varieties have proposed within the species. None are accepted by Plants of the World Online as of June 2026, which treats Opuntia macrorhiza subsp. pottsii (Salm-Dyck) U.Guzmán & Mandujano and Opuntia macrorhiza var. pottsii (Salm-Dyck) L.D.Benson as the separate species Opuntia pottsii.
