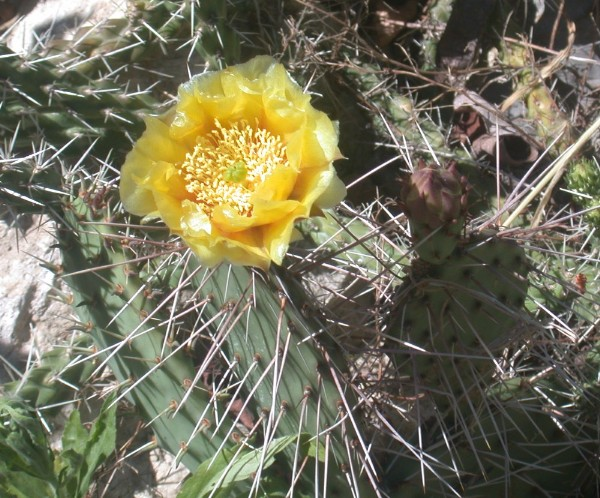

Scientific classification
- Kingdom: Plantae
- Clade: Embryophytes
- Clade: Tracheophytes
- Clade: Spermatophytes
- Clade: Angiosperms
- Clade: Eudicots
- Order: Caryophyllales
- Family: Cactaceae
- Genus: Opuntia
- Species: O. tortispina

Binomial name
- Opuntia tortispina Engelm. & J.M.Bigelow

Synonyms
- List: Opuntia cymochila Engelm. & J.M.Bigelow; Opuntia mackensenii var. minor (M.S.Anthony) A.M.Powell & Weedin; Opuntia macrocentra var. minor M.S.Anthony; Opuntia mesacantha var. cymochila (Engelm. & J.M.Bigelow) J.M.Coult.; Opuntia rafinesquei f. cymochila (Engelm. & J.M.Bigelow) Schelle; Opuntia sanguinocula Griffiths; Opuntia tortispina var. cymochila (Engelm. & J.M.Bigelow) Backeb.

= Opuntia tortispina =

Central North American species of cactus

Opuntia tortispina is a species of flowering plant in the family Cactaceae, native to the central United States (Colorado, Kansas, Nebraska, New Mexico, Oklahoma, Texas and Wyoming). It was first described in 1856.

== Description ==
Opuntia tortispina is of moderate height, growing to 40 centimeters. Its stems are not easily detached from each other at the joints. The surface of the stems are hairless, except next to the spines, starting out glossy and pale to deep green in color, but becoming more gray with age. The pads are flattened and broad, ranging from egg-shaped to teardrop-shaped and 6.5–15 centimeters long by 4–10 across. When stressed the surface of the pads will be wrinkled.

The attachment points for the spines and hairs, called areoles in botanical texts, are wart like bumps 2.5–5 by 1.5–4 millimeters across. Their outlines may be almost circular, oval, or teardrop shaped. The areoles are arranged in rows with 6 to 9 across the middle of the pad. They are covered in woolly hairs that are tan when new and age to dark brown in color. Each areole will have 1–9 spines on the outer half of the pad and may either have spines or lack them towards the base. The spines are generally chalky white to gray in color for most of the length with pale brown or yellow tips and bases. However, they are occasionally completely brown. The length of a central spine is 25–70 millimeters while those towards the sides are 5–15 millimeters and more slender.

The flowers are large, 4–6 centimeters across, and brightly colored golden or yellow with a red center.

== Taxonomy ==
The first scientific description was published by George Engelmann and John Milton Bigelow in 1856. However, they also identified some specimens as a separate species under the name Opuntia cymochila, which is synonymized with Opuntia tortispina by many botanical authorities. Since that time it has been described once more as a species (Opuntia sanguinocula) and four more times as a subspecies of Opuntia mackensenii, Opuntia macrocentra, Opuntia mesacantha, or Opuntia rafinesquei. However, as of 2024 Opuntia tortispina is generally accepted as the correct classification.

In 2024 Plants of the World Online (POWO) and the Flora of North America do not recognize any valid subspecies for Opuntia tortispina. However, World Flora Online continues to recognize Opuntia cymochila as a separate valid species.
