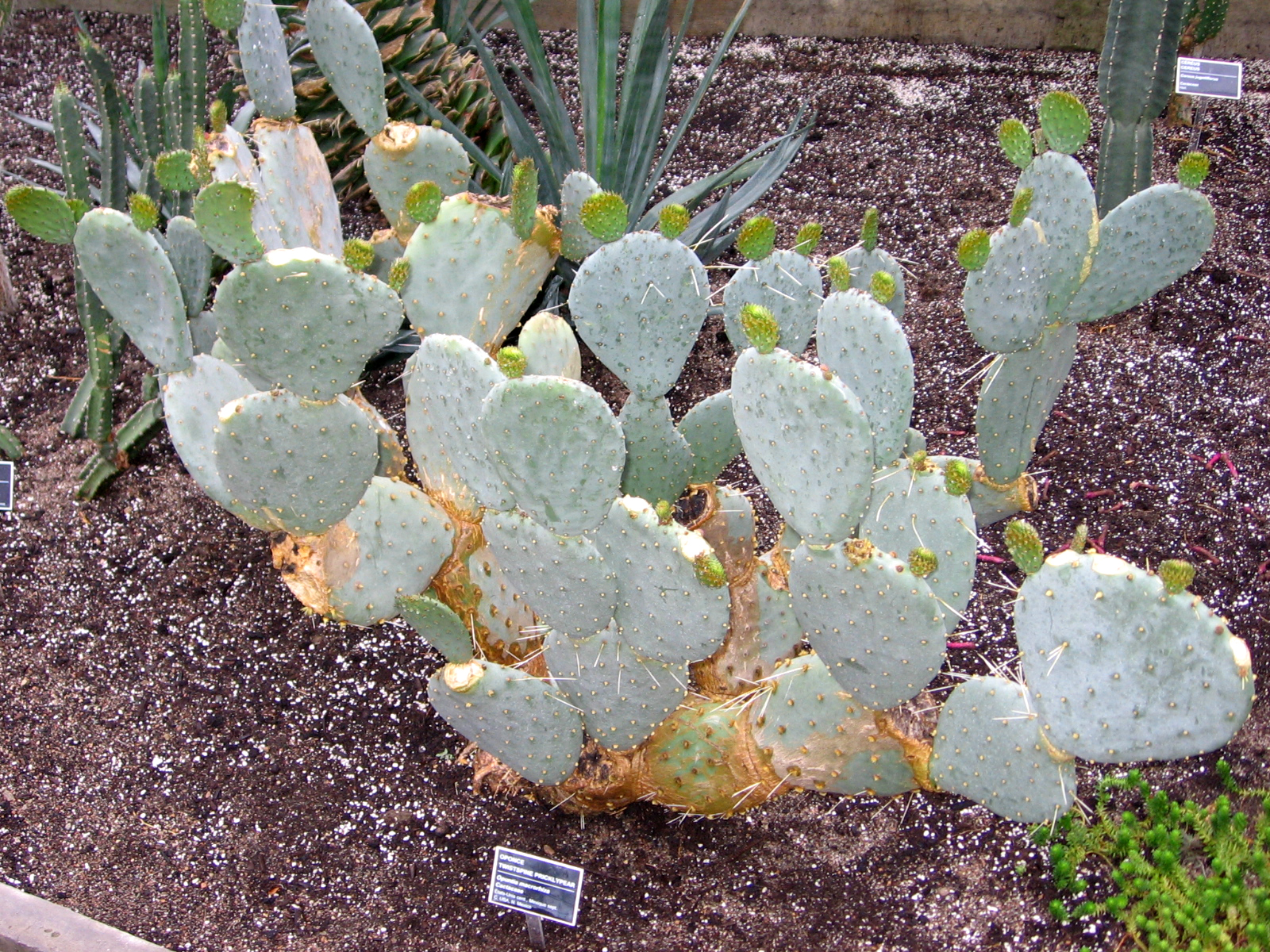

Scientific classification
- Kingdom: Plantae
- Clade: Tracheophytes
- Clade: Angiosperms
- Clade: Eudicots
- Order: Caryophyllales
- Family: Cactaceae
- Genus: Opuntia
- Species: O. setispina

Binomial name
- Opuntia setispina Engelm.

= Opuntia setispina =

Species of cactus

Opuntia setispina is a species of cactus found in the Sierra Madre Occidental in Chihuahua, Sonora, and Durango in Mexico. The name O. setispina has been listed as a synonym under Opuntia macrorhiza and Opuntia pottsii, but shows no close relationship to either species. It is more of a woody shrubby, often somewhat tree-like species, growing up to approximately 1 meter tall and wide. It is morphologically similar to Opuntia chlorotica, Opuntia santa-rita, and Opuntia gosseliniana.

== Description ==
Opuntia setispina usually has a single trunk (to occasionally several), mostly ascending to vertical. These trunks are made up of rounded bluish-green to grayish-green cladodes that can reach up to 20 cm in length. Spines on younger cladodes are relatively short (most under 2.5 cm, occasionally longer), slender, with from 0 to 6 per areole, and are usually white. Glochids are in tight white to yellowish clumps. Glochids and spines tend to increase in number and length on older stems, often densely covering trunks. Flowers are rich yellow. Fruits are ovoid to globose, pinkish to red when mature, about 3 cm long, juicy and edible, though not particularly palatable.

== Taxonomy ==
This species, of genus Opuntia and subgenus Opuntia, show close morphological similarity to Opuntia chlorotica, O. santa-rita, and O. gosseliniana. There is evidence of it intergrading with all three where distributions border on each other. The possibly of this taxon being conspecific with those three needs further investigation. Current references and studies relating to O. setispina are few.

== Distribution ==
Western Chihuahua, western Durango, eastern Sonora, and perhaps into Zacatecas & Sinaloa, in Mexico.
