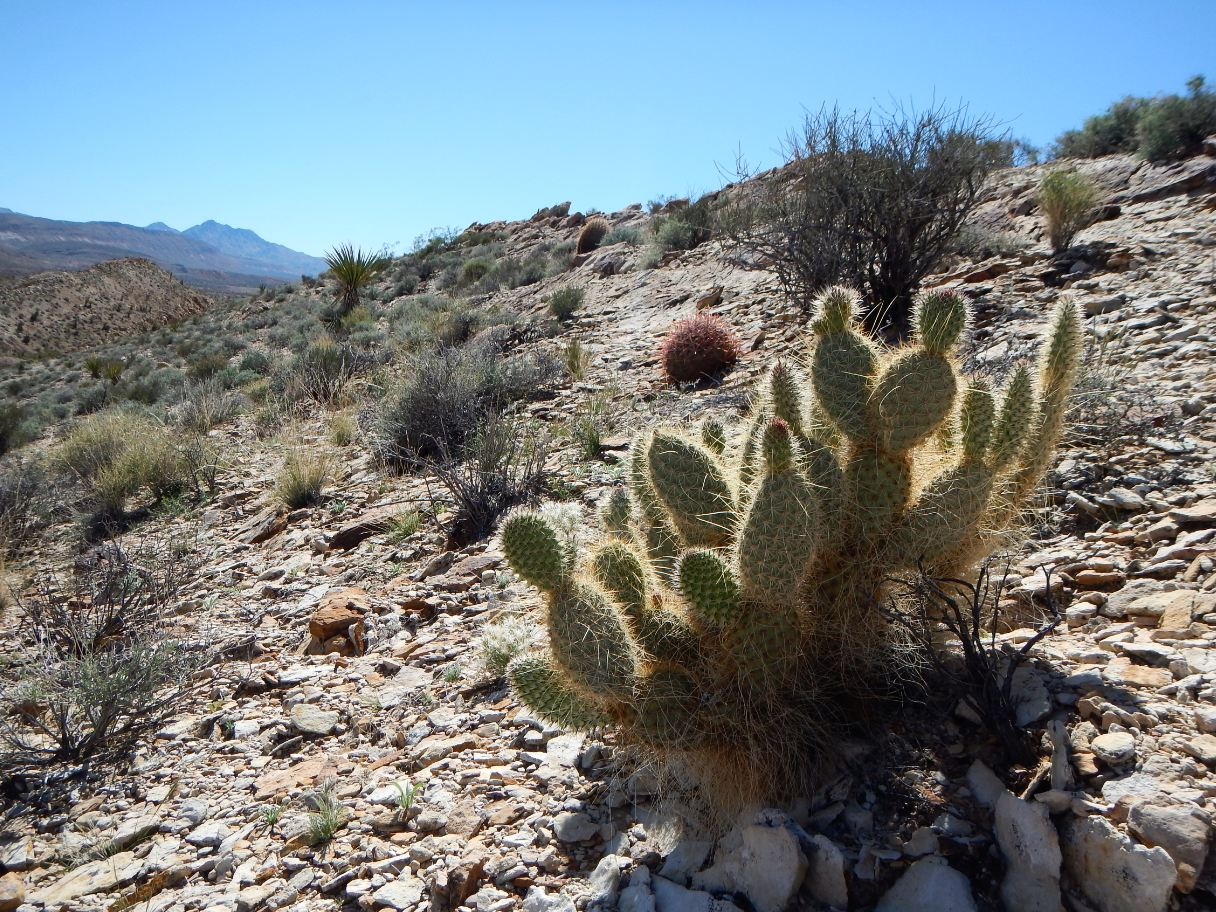
- Opuntia diploursina

Scientific classification
- Kingdom: Plantae
- Clade: Tracheophytes
- Clade: Angiosperms
- Clade: Eudicots
- Order: Caryophyllales
- Family: Cactaceae
- Genus: Opuntia
- Species: O. diploursina

Binomial name
- Opuntia diploursina Stock, Hussey, & Beckstrom

= Opuntia diploursina =

Species of cactus

Opuntia diploursina is a species in the family Cactaceae, that grows near and in Lake Mead National Recreation Area and extending northward across Nevada's Mormon Mesa into Utah.

== Description ==
This species is a close relative and likely ancestor of Opuntia erinacea but differs in several characteristics, including minor spines that are more closely appressed to the pad surface, smaller and more flexible spines, shorter inter-areolar distance, upright growth habit, larger fruit with longer and more flexible spines, larger seeds, and a diploid chromosome number of 2n=22.".

Opuntia diploursina is also related to another diploid species, O. trichophora, but differs from it in having a more upright growth habit, minor spines that are more closely appressed to the pad surface, closer spaced areoles, often yellow spine color (in contrast to white or gray mature spines), and more and longer spines on fruit. Additionally, O. diploursina exhibits curling major spines and larger fruit. These two species are geographically separated by hundreds of miles.

Wherever Opuntia diploursina (2n=22) and Opuntia basilaris (2n=22) co-occur, they are known to hybridize, resulting in fertile progeny that can backcross with either parent, eventually creating a hybrid swarm. The polyploid O. erinacea (2n=44), widely distributed in the Mojave and Great Basin deserts, is suspected to be a stabilized allopolyploid derived from O. diploursina and O. basilaris. Some progeny from the cross between O. diploursina and O. basilaris resemble O. basilaris var. treleasei (2n=33), an endemic species of California.
