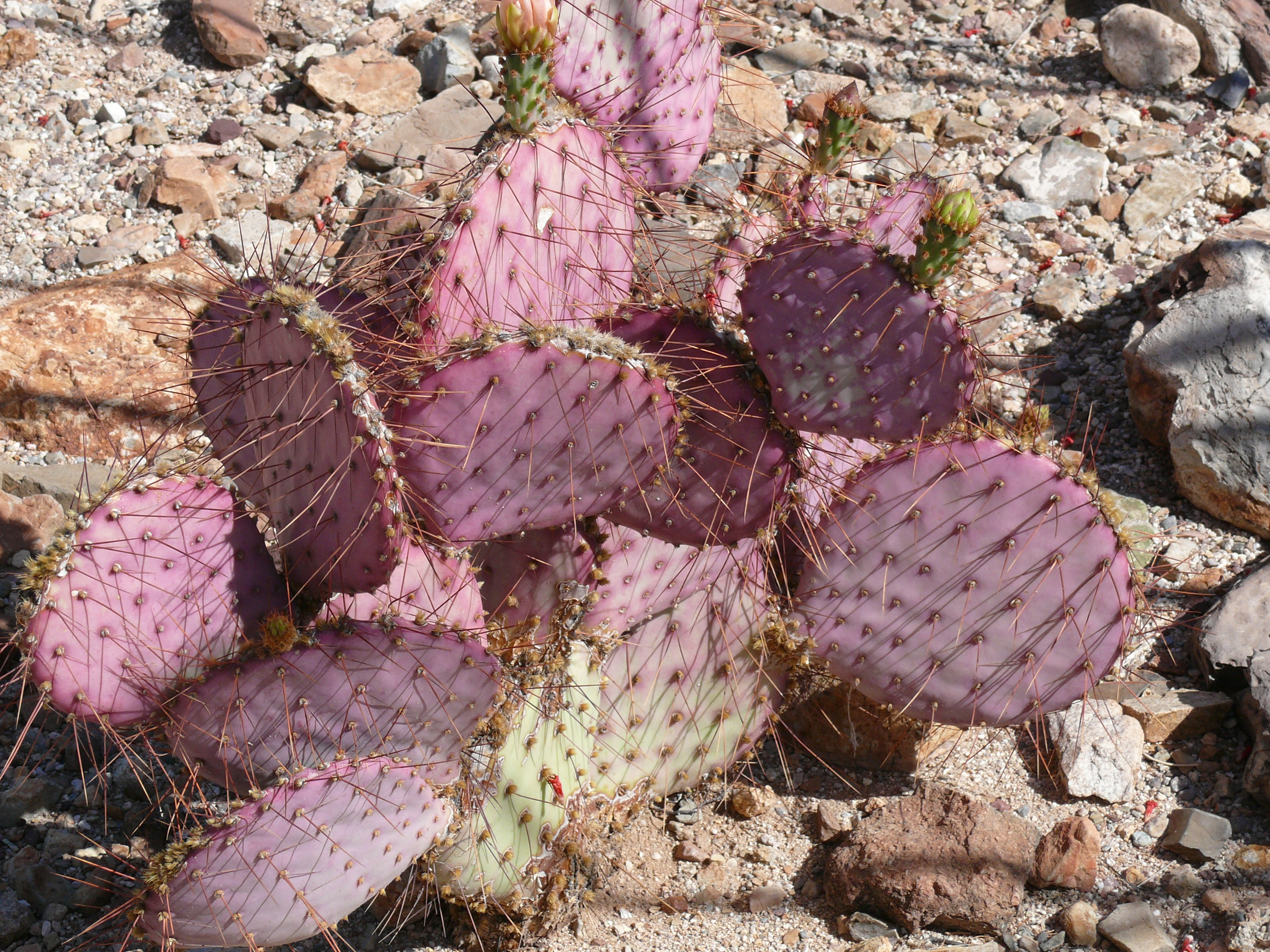
- Opuntia gosseliniana var. duraznilla

Conservation status
- Least Concern (IUCN 3.1)

Scientific classification
- Kingdom: Plantae
- Clade: Embryophytes
- Clade: Tracheophytes
- Clade: Spermatophytes
- Clade: Angiosperms
- Clade: Eudicots
- Order: Caryophyllales
- Family: Cactaceae
- Genus: Opuntia
- Species: O. gosseliniana

Binomial name
- Opuntia gosseliniana F.A.C.Weber

Synonyms
- Opuntia chlorotica var. gosseliniana (F.A.C.Weber) D.J.Ferguson; Opuntia chlorotica var. santa-rita Griffiths & Hare; Opuntia gosseliniana var. santa-rita (Griffiths & Hare) L.D.Benson; Opuntia gosseliniana subsp. santa-rita (Griffiths & Hare) Guiggi; Opuntia santa-rita (Griffiths & Hare) Rose; Opuntia shreveana C.Z.Nelson; Opuntia violacea var. gosseliniana (F.A.C.Weber) L.D.Benson; Opuntia violacea var. santa-rita (Griffiths & Hare) L.D.Benson

= Opuntia gosseliniana =

Species of cactus

Opuntia gosseliniana, commonly known as the violet pricklypear, is a species of cactus that is native to the United States and Mexico.

== Description ==
Like most prickly pears, the pads are flat. Unlike most prickly pears, they have a violet, pink, or red tinge. The cactus reaches mature heights of one to five feet and blooms either yellow or red.

== Taxonomy ==
Different authorities disagree on the division of plants into Opuntia chlorotica, Opuntia violacea, Opuntia gosseliniana, Opuntia macrocentra, and perhaps others. To complicate the issue, there are numerous natural hybrids between species.

=== Varieties ===
- O. gosseliniana var. duraznilla
- O. gosseliniana var. santa-rita (also known as Opuntia santa-rita)

== Distribution ==
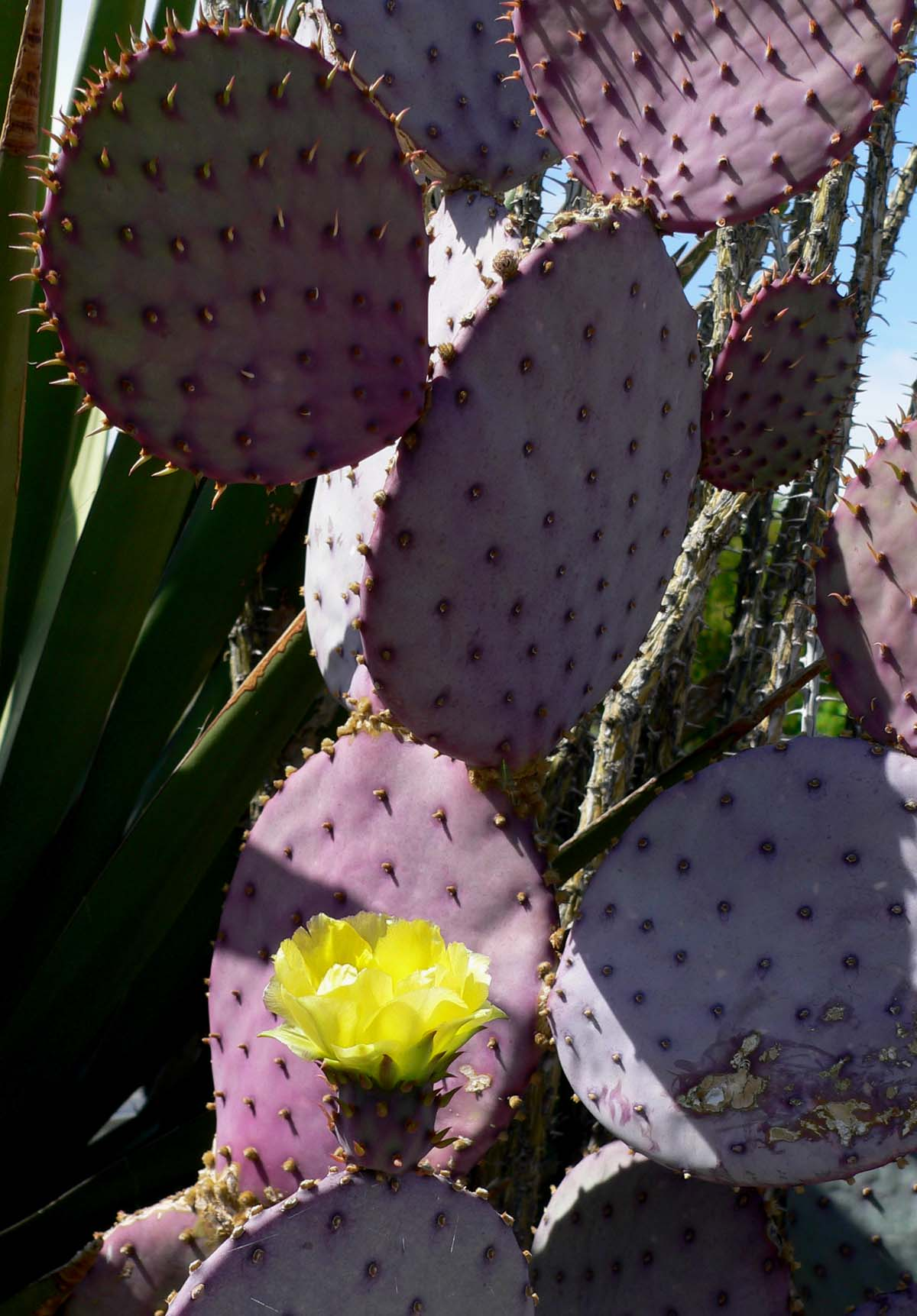
Santa Rita Prickly Pear

The above-mentioned taxonomic issues complicate any attempt to describe the distribution of particular varieties or species. O. gosseliniana is especially known from Mexico, but has been reported from Arizona. It is found growing at Pima County, Arizona and Baja California, Chihuahua, and Sonora in Mexico.
