= ESCP =

ESCP can refer to:

- ESCP, École Supérieure de Commerce de Paris, a private French business school
- ESC/P, Epson Standard Code for Printers, a printer control language developed by Epson

== Science ==
- European Scientific Cooperative on Phytotherapy (ESCOP acronym short-name);
- European Society for Cognitive Psychology (ESCoP), ignores "for", Co = "Cognitive".
