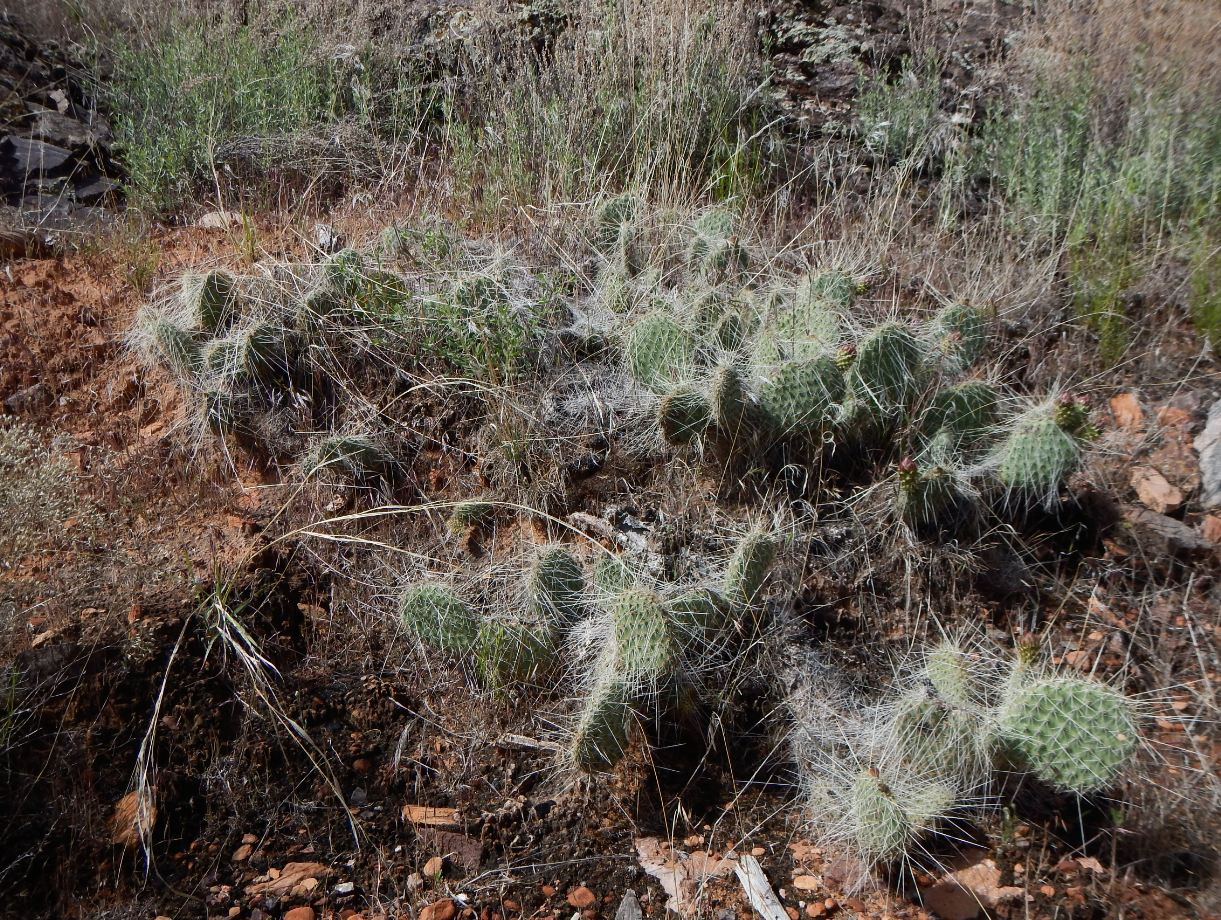

Scientific classification
- Kingdom: Plantae
- Clade: Tracheophytes
- Clade: Angiosperms
- Clade: Eudicots
- Order: Caryophyllales
- Family: Cactaceae
- Genus: Opuntia
- Species: O. trichophora

Binomial name
- Opuntia trichophora (Engelm. & J.M.Bigelow) Britton & Rose

= Opuntia trichophora =

Species of cactus

Opuntia trichophora is a species of cactus in the genus Opuntia, more commonly known as prickly pears or nopal. O. trichophora is distributed throughout parts of New Mexico, Colorado, and Utah, and may have disjoint populations in Wyoming, southern Montana, and southern Idaho. Opuntia trichophora is a diploid (2n=22) but has sometimes been treated as a variety of Opuntia polyacantha a tetraploid (2n=44). O. trichophora tends to have longer spines than O. polycantha or O. macrorhiza.
