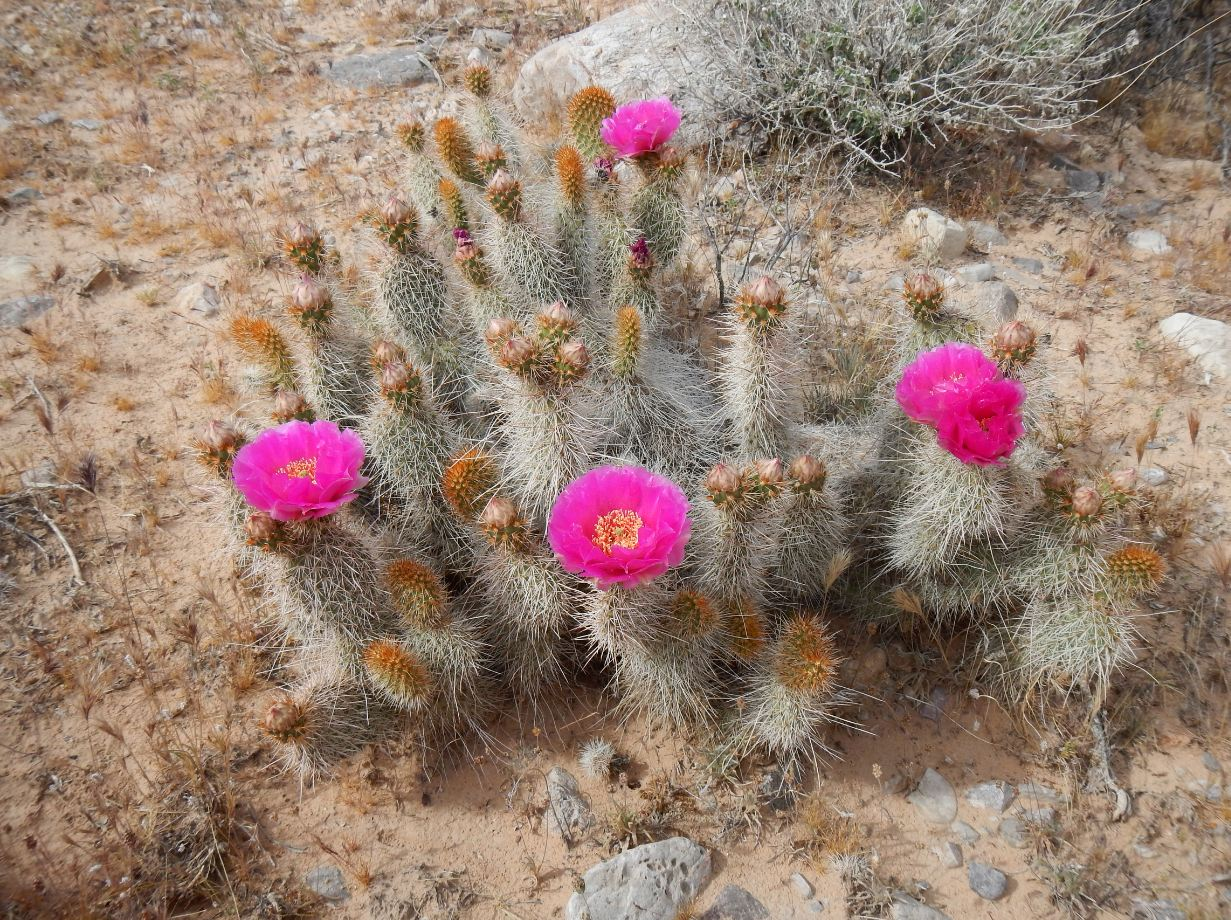

Scientific classification
- Kingdom: Plantae
- Clade: Tracheophytes
- Clade: Angiosperms
- Clade: Eudicots
- Order: Caryophyllales
- Family: Cactaceae
- Genus: Opuntia
- Species: O. erinacea

Binomial name
- Opuntia erinacea Engelm. & J.M.Bigelow

= Opuntia erinacea =

Mojave prickly pear

Species of cactus

Opuntia erinacea, the Mojave prickly pear, is a plant that was previously treated as a variety of Opuntia polyacantha, in the family Cactaceae, that is a distributed throughout the Mojave and into the southern Great Basin deserts in the United States.

Opuntia erinacea is proposed by A.D. Stock to be an allopolyploid that resulted from hybridization between Opuntia diploursina and Opuntia basilaris.; although ties with other varieties of Opuntia polyacantha are also strongly evident.
