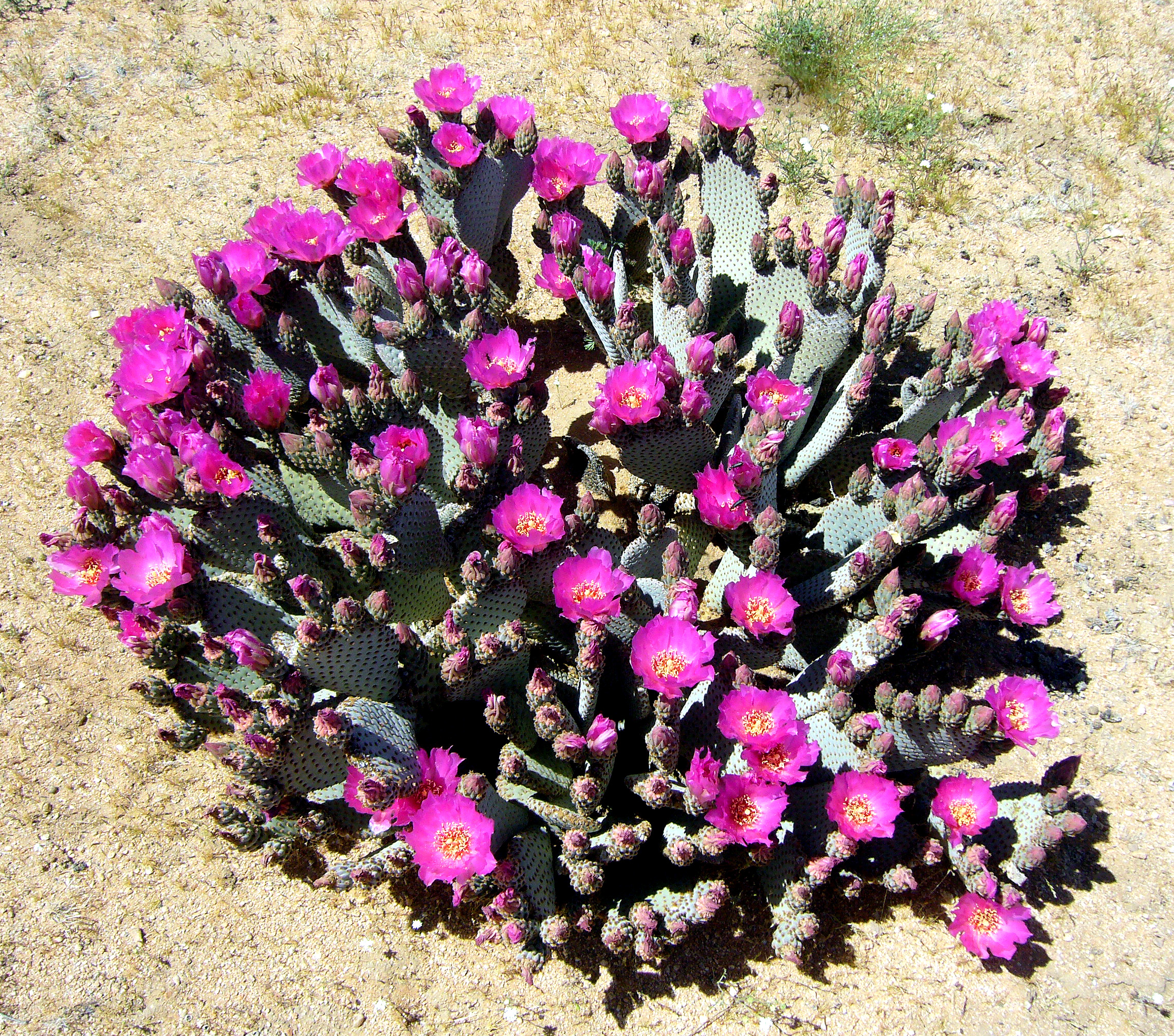

Conservation status
- Least Concern (IUCN 3.1)

Scientific classification
- Kingdom: Plantae
- Clade: Tracheophytes
- Clade: Angiosperms
- Clade: Eudicots
- Order: Caryophyllales
- Family: Cactaceae
- Genus: Opuntia
- Species: O. basilaris

Binomial name
- Opuntia basilaris Engelm. & J.M.Bigelow, 1857

= Opuntia basilaris =

Species of cactus

Opuntia basilaris, the beavertail cactus or beavertail pricklypear, is a cactus species found in the southwest United States. It occurs mostly in the Mojave, Anza-Borrego, and Colorado Deserts, as well as in the Colorado Plateau and northwest Mexico. It is also found throughout the Grand Canyon and Colorado River region as well as into southern Utah and Nevada, and in the western Arizona regions along the Lower Colorado River Valley.

== Description ==
Opuntia basilaris is a medium to small-sized prickly pear cactus 70–400 mm (2.8–15.7 in) tall, with pink to rose colored flowers. A single plant may consist of hundreds of fleshy, flattened pads. These are more or less blue-gray, depending on variety, 50–210 mm (2.0–8.3 in) long and less than 100 mm (3.9 in) wide and 10–15 mm (0.4–0.6 in) thick. They are typically spineless, but as is typical for Opuntia species, have many small barbed bristles, called glochids, that easily penetrate the skin. Opuntia basilaris blooms from spring to early summer.

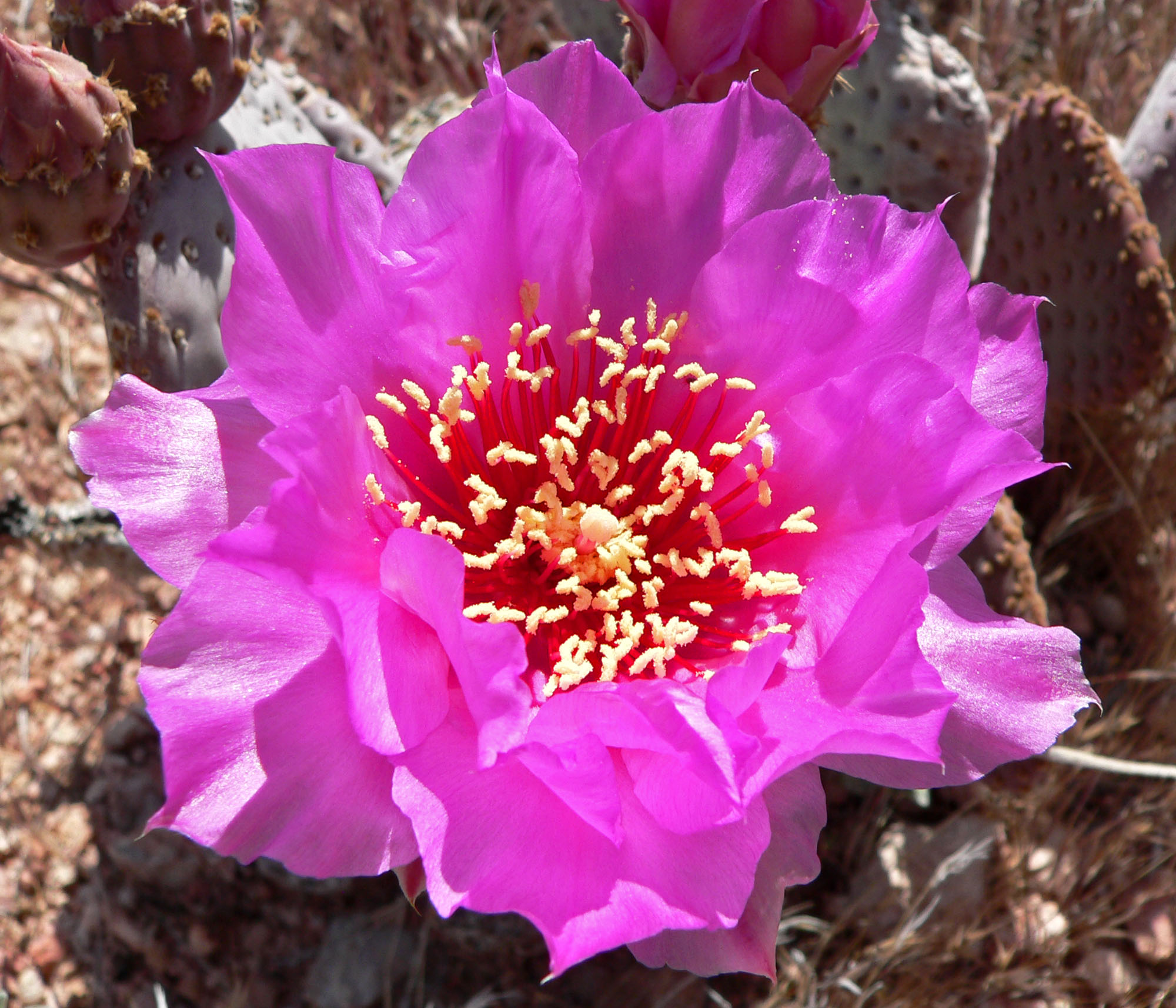
Deep magenta-red filaments and white to pink style

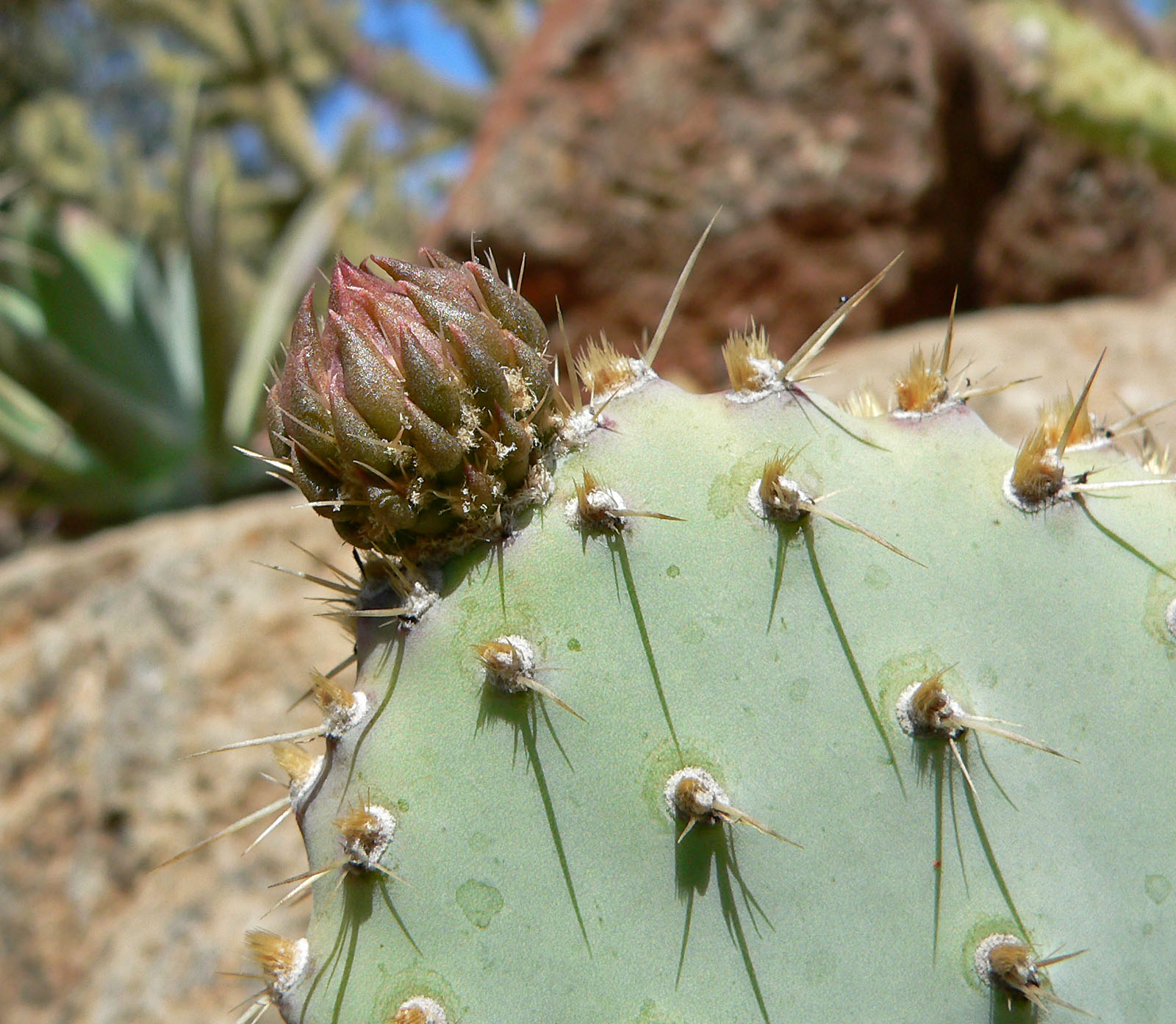
Each areole supports many glochids but are usually without spines.

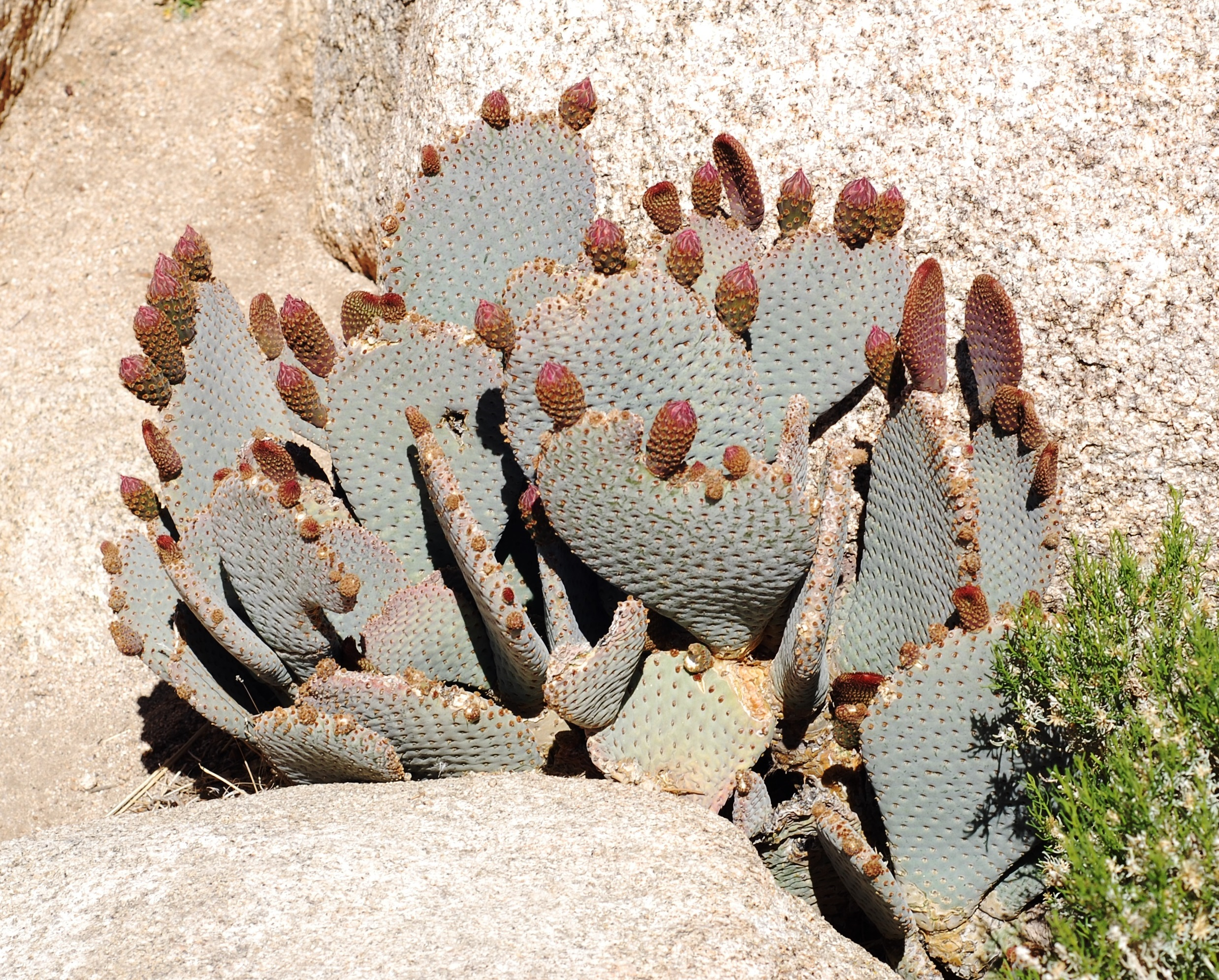
Buds, in Joshua Tree National Park

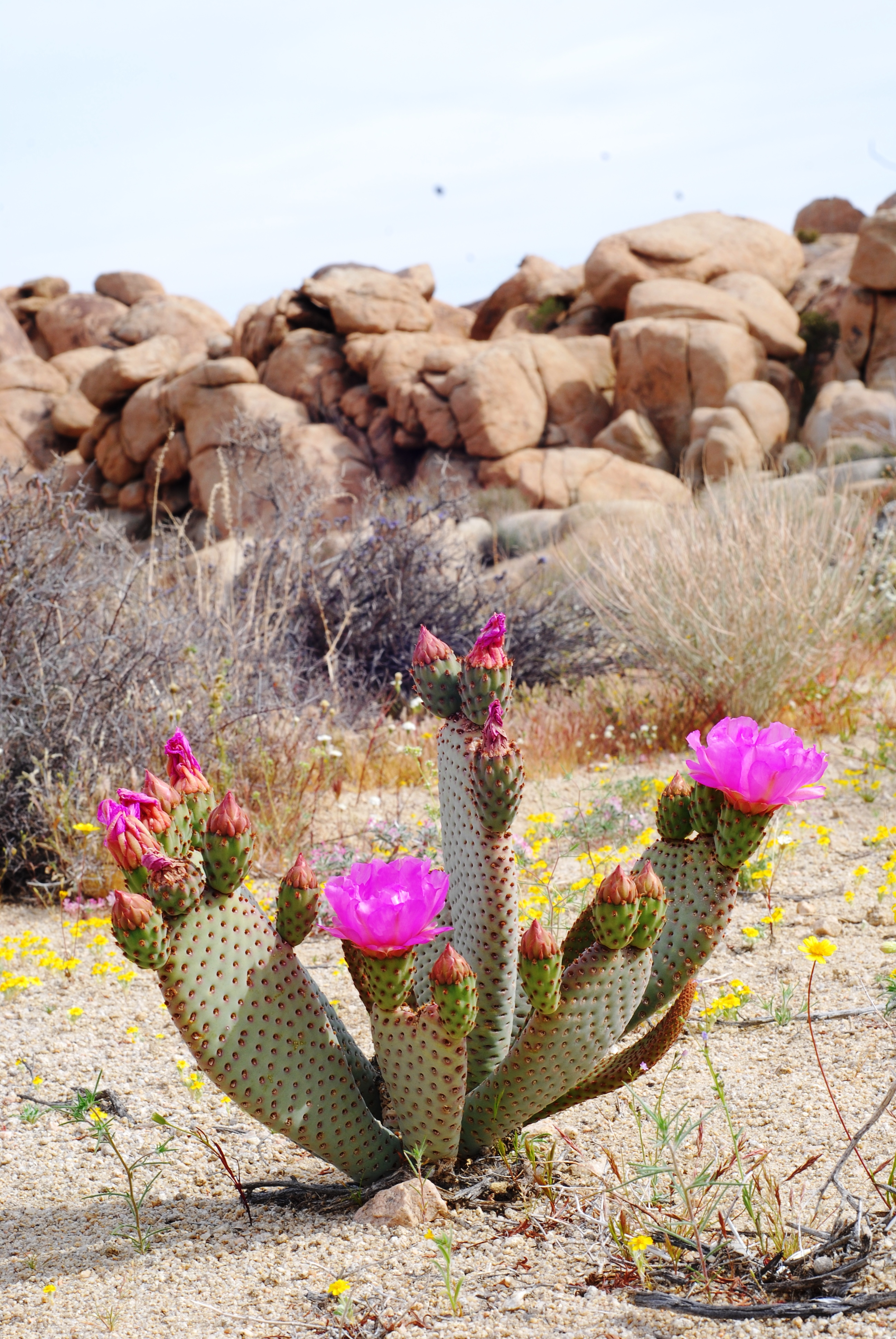
Flowers, in Joshua Tree National Park

== Taxonomy ==
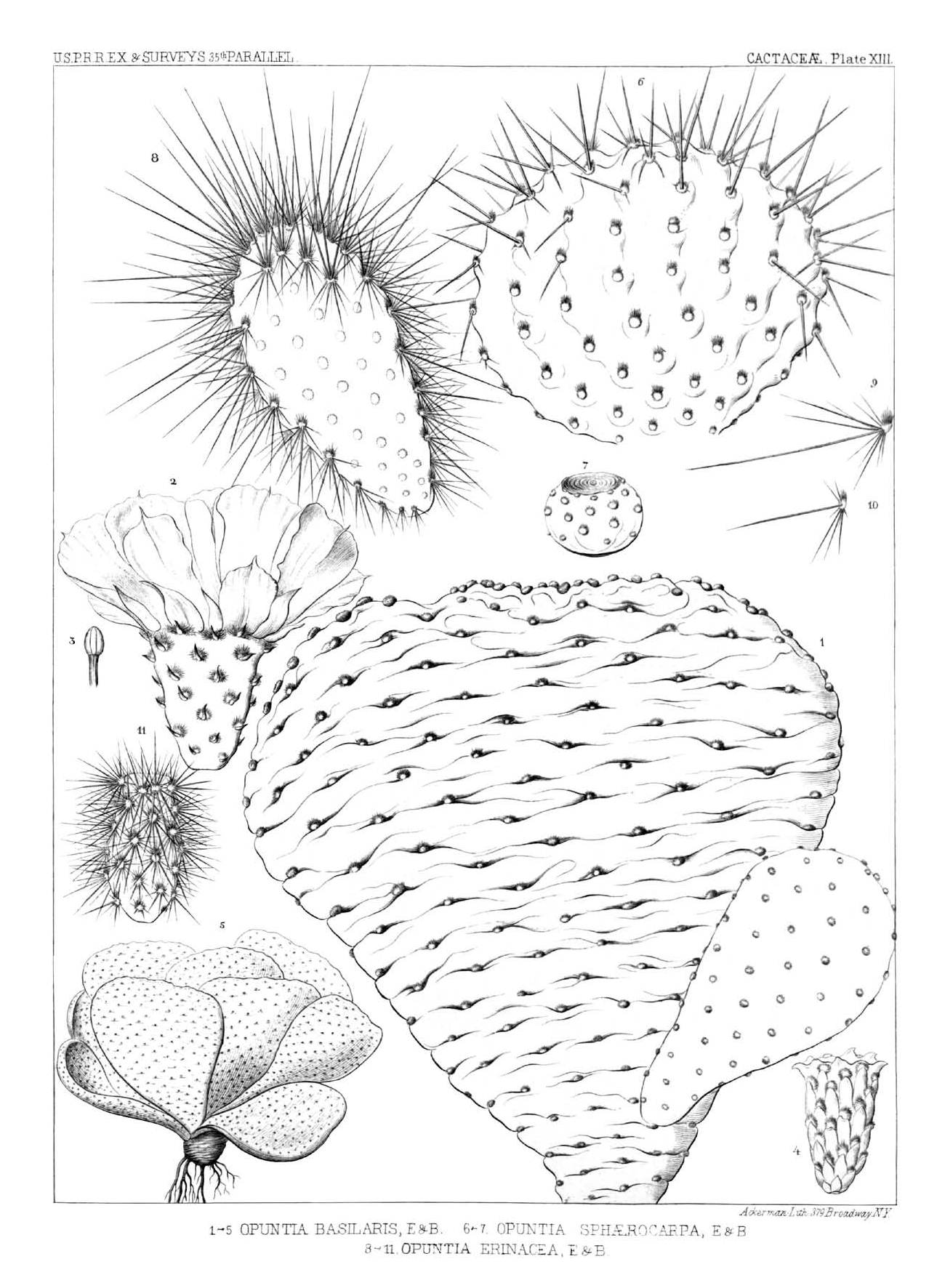
Opuntia basilaris, Opuntia sphærocarpa, Opuntia erinacea

One of the first known descriptions of Opuntia basilaris come from the reports of the explorations and surveys for a railroad route from the Mississippi River to the Pacific Ocean. This expedition followed the 35th parallel through New Mexico, Arizona, and California. In the 4th volume of this report, The Botany of the Expedition, by George Engelmann and John M. Bigelow, Opuntia basilaris is described as a stout, fan-shaped Opuntia resembling an open cabbage head, with accompanying illustrations.

== Varieties ==
The species is variable in nature and several names under different ranks have been described. Only four of these are generally accepted.

- Opuntia basilaris var. basilaris (2n=22)
- Opuntia basilaris var. brachyclada (2n=22) – Little beavertail pricklypear
- Opuntia basilaris var. heilii (2n=22) – Heil's beavertail
- Opuntia basilaris var. longiareolata (2n=22) – Elongated beavertail prickly pear or Grand Canyon beavertail pricklypear
- Opuntia basilaris var. treleasei (2n=33) – Trelease's beavertail prickly pear, Bakersfield cactus (This variety is designated as endangered under the federal Endangered Species Act and California Endangered Species Act, which means that killing or possessing it is prohibited in California)

Some experts consider the Trelease's beavertail to be a full species (Bowen 1987, R. van de Hoek). It is unique among the varieties of Opuntia basilaris in that the areoles contain spines in addition to the bristles; this indicates that the species does vary a lot in its exterior.

== Distribution and habitat ==
This species of cactus is found in the Southwest US regions including California, Nevada, Arizona, Utah, and Northwestern Sonora, Mexico. This plant can be found in chaparral, desert, and grassland. This cactus grows in well draining mediums composed of sand, gravel, cobble, or even on boulders.

== Chemistry ==
Opuntia basilaris contains 0.01% mescaline and 4-hydroxy-3-5-dimethoxyphenethylamine.

== Uses ==
The Cahuilla Native Americans used beavertail as a food staple. The buds were cooked or steamed, and then were eaten or stored. The large seeds were ground up to be eaten as mush. The Diegueño would consume it as a dried fruit after removing the spines. The Shoshone Native American Tribe took advantage of the analgesic properties of this cactus by creating a poultice from the inner mucilage to treat minor cuts.
