= European Scientific Cooperative on Phytotherapy =

The European Scientific Cooperative on Phytotherapy (ESCOP) was founded in 1989 as an umbrella organisation, representing national European phytotherapy associations (Herbal Medicine). Associations in non-EU states can also be members of ESCOP.

== Tasks ==
In particular ESCOP’s scientific committee produces reviews of the therapeutic use of leading herbal medicinal products or herbal drug preparations (similar to the prior German Kommission E) based on scientific evidence and on leading expertise across Europe. The goal was to advance the scientific status of herbal medicinal products and to assist with the harmonisation of their regulatory status at the European level and thus to promote the acceptance of herbal drugs, also called phytomedicines. Besides that, the aim was to promote scientific research in the field of medicinal plants. Since 1992, ESCOP Herbal monographs are being published on the quality, safety and efficacy of herbal medicines, based on scientific evidence and textbooks. In 2003, 80 monographs were published in bookform, in 2009, 27 additional monographs appeared. Since 2011, 54 new and updated monographs were published online. Publication is ongoing. In total 107 ESCOP monographs have been produced and submitted to the European Medicines Agency.

The ESCOP monographs serve as an invaluable source of scientific information, for health professionals, academics, researchers, regulators, manufacturers, as well as the pharmaceutical industry, that uses them as an orientation to support application or registration of herbal medicinal products. Based on the rules of the Community code for medicinal products, for human use, they can be drawn upon and quoted by the Drug Authorities to support an applicant test. Monographs resemble the format of a Summary of Product Characteristics (SPC), which is a basis for the information required for medicinal products, e.g. in the package leaflet. ESCOP herbal monographs provide a selected overview of the published literature. In different professional publications, ESCOP-monographs are mentioned besides WHO-monographs as literature sources and as expert opinions.

ESCOP participated in more than five scientific international symposia, in collaboration with its member societies and among others with the «Society for Medicinal Plant and Natural Product Research” (GA). In a symposium organised by the „Schweizerische medizinische Gesellschaft für Phytotherapie” (SMGP, CH) in the year 2014, together with the University Hospital of Zürich, the „Forschungsinstitut für Biologischen Landbau” (FiBL in Frick CH) and the Phytopharmazie branch of the „Zürcher Hochschule für Angewandte Wissenschaften“ (ZHAW in Wädenswil CH), ESCOP was active and supportive.

== Publications ==
Journal: the journal Phytomedicine is published in affiliation with the European Scientific Cooperative On Phytotherapy (ESCOP).

Books:

- ESCOP monographs. Thieme, Stuttgart 2003, ISBN 3-13-129421-3.
- ESCOP monographs. Supplement. Thieme, Stuttgart 2009, ISBN 978-3-13-149981-3.
