= Phytomedicine (journal) =

- Discipline: Pharmacology
- Language: English
- Edited by: Alexander Panossian

Publication details
- History: 1994-present
- Publisher: Elsevier
- Frequency: Monthly
- Impact factor: 11.3 (2025)

Standard abbreviations
- ISO 4: Phytomedicine

Indexing
- CODEN: PYTOEY
- ISSN: 0944-7113 (print); 1618-095X (web)
- LCCN: 94660907
- OCLC no.: 663411222

Links
- Journal homepage; Online access; Online archive; Journal page at publisher's website

Phytomedicine is a monthly peer-reviewed medical journal covering the fields of phytotherapy, phytomedicine, and toxicology of plants and their extracts. The journal was established in 1994. It is published by Elsevier (formerly Urban & Fischer) and the editor-in-chief is Alexander Panossian (Swedish Herbal Institute).

== Abstracting and indexing ==
The journal is abstracted and indexed in:

- BIOSIS Previews
- Biochemistry and Biophysics Citation Index
- CINAHL
- Current Contents/Clinical Medicine
- Current Contents/Life Sciences
- Index Medicus/MEDLINE/PubMed
- Science Citation Index Expanded
- Elsevier BIOBASE/Current Awareness in Biological Sciences
- Chemical Abstracts Service
- Embase/Excerpta Medica
- Scopus

According to the Journal Citation Reports, the journal had a 2021 impact factor of 6.656.
