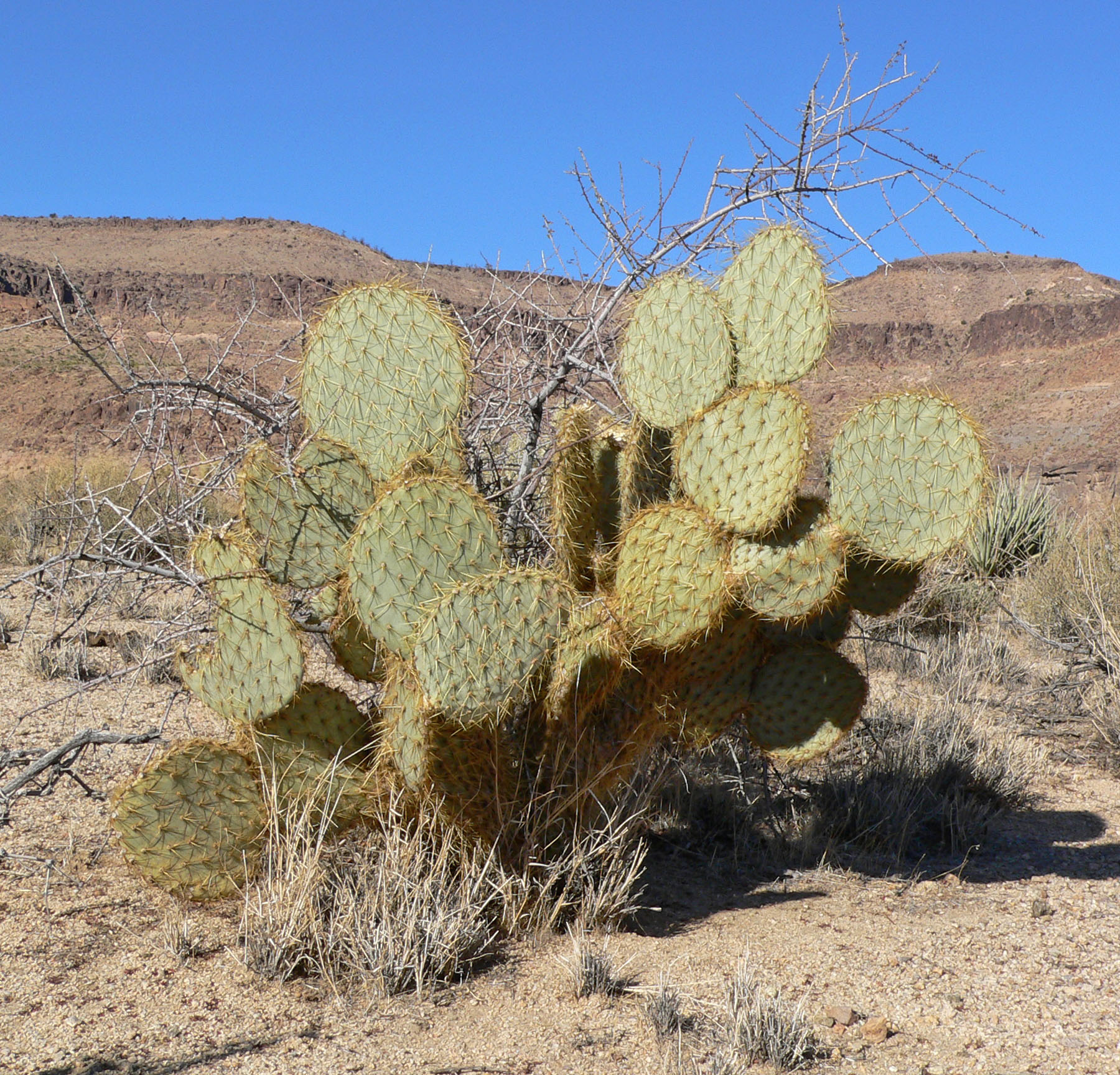

Conservation status
- Least Concern (IUCN 3.1)

Scientific classification
- Kingdom: Plantae
- Clade: Tracheophytes
- Clade: Angiosperms
- Clade: Eudicots
- Order: Caryophyllales
- Family: Cactaceae
- Genus: Opuntia
- Species: O. chlorotica

Binomial name
- Opuntia chlorotica Engelm. & Bigelow

= Opuntia chlorotica =

Species of cactus

Opuntia chlorotica is a species of prickly pear in the family Cactaceae. Its common names include pancake prickly pear, flapjack prickly pear and dollarjoint prickly pear.

== Description ==
The cactus is bluish-green and manifests a bushy to erect form that may attain a height of two meters or more. Some analysis of the prehistoric range of O. chlorotica has been conducted by studies in the Waterman Mountains of Arizona; these pollen core analyses indicate that this cactus species was present in northern Arizona in late Wisconsinan glaciation period.

== Distribution and habitat ==
The species is native to the southwestern United States and northern Mexico.

== Notes ==
- Nathaniel Lord Britton. 1919. The Cactaceae: Descriptions and illustrations of plants of the cactus family 236 pages
- C. Michael Hogan. 2009. Elephant Tree: Bursera microphylla, GlobalTwitcher.com, ed. N. Stromberg
- Jepson Manual Treatment: Opuntia chlorotica. 1993
