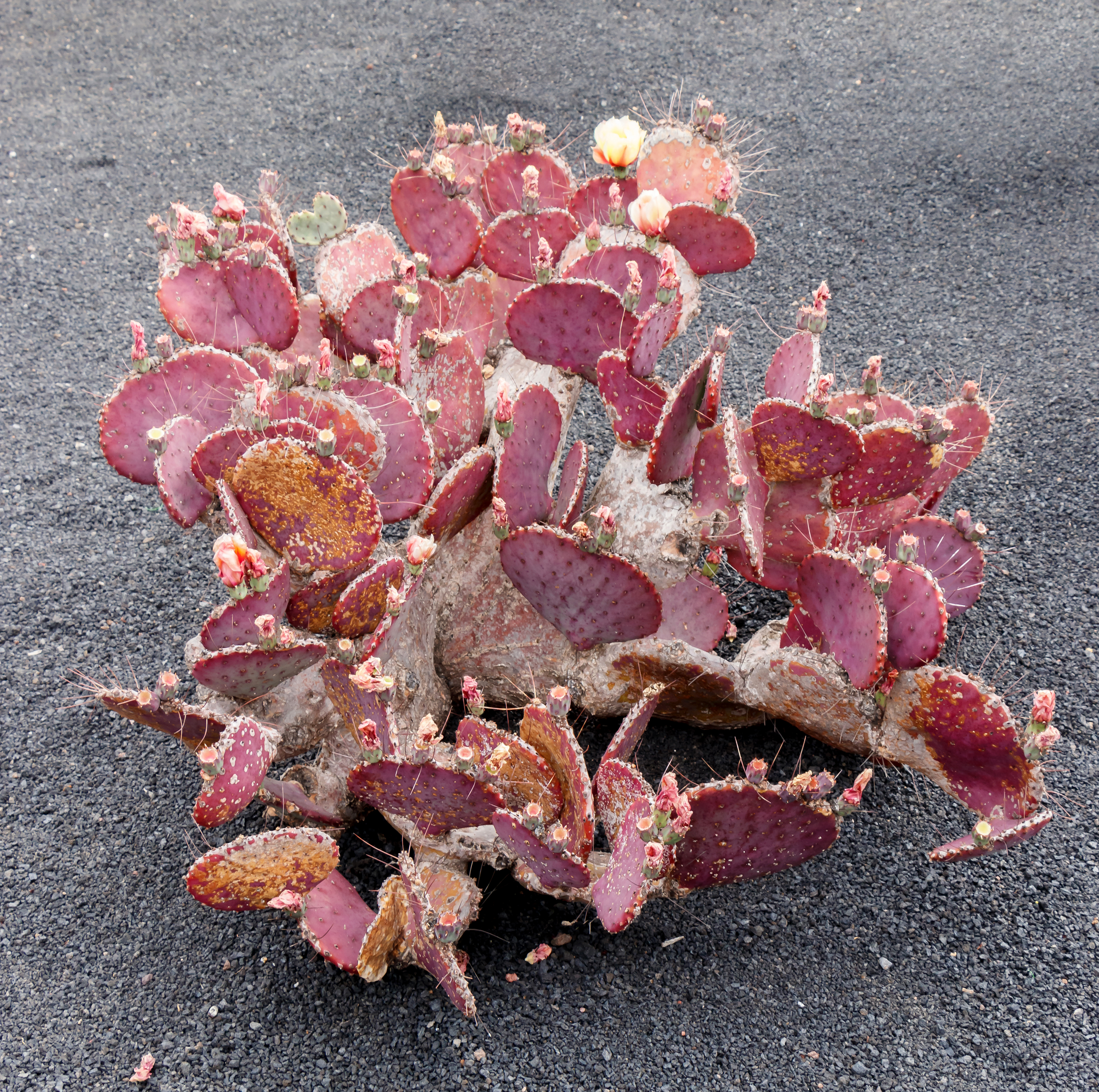

Conservation status
- Least Concern (IUCN 3.1)

Scientific classification
- Kingdom: Plantae
- Clade: Embryophytes
- Clade: Tracheophytes
- Clade: Spermatophytes
- Clade: Angiosperms
- Clade: Eudicots
- Order: Caryophyllales
- Family: Cactaceae
- Genus: Opuntia
- Species: O. macrocentra

Binomial name
- Opuntia macrocentra Engelm.

Synonyms
- Opuntia horstii Heinrich; Opuntia violacea Engelm.; Opuntia violacea var. castetteri L.D.Benson; Opuntia violacea var. macrocentra (Engelm.) L.D.Benson

= Opuntia macrocentra =

Species of cactus

Opuntia macrocentra, the long-spined purplish prickly pear or purple pricklypear, is a cactus found in the lower Southwestern United States and Northwestern Mexico. A member of the prickly pear genus, this species of Opuntia is most notable as one of a few cacti that produce a purple pigmentation in the stem. Other common names for this plant include black-spined pricklypear, long-spine prickly pear, purple pricklypear, and redeye prickly pear.

Opuntia macrocentra is an upright spreading shrub consisting of several joined segments called pads. This cactus produces large colorful yellow and red flowers and dark red edible fruits.

== Distribution ==
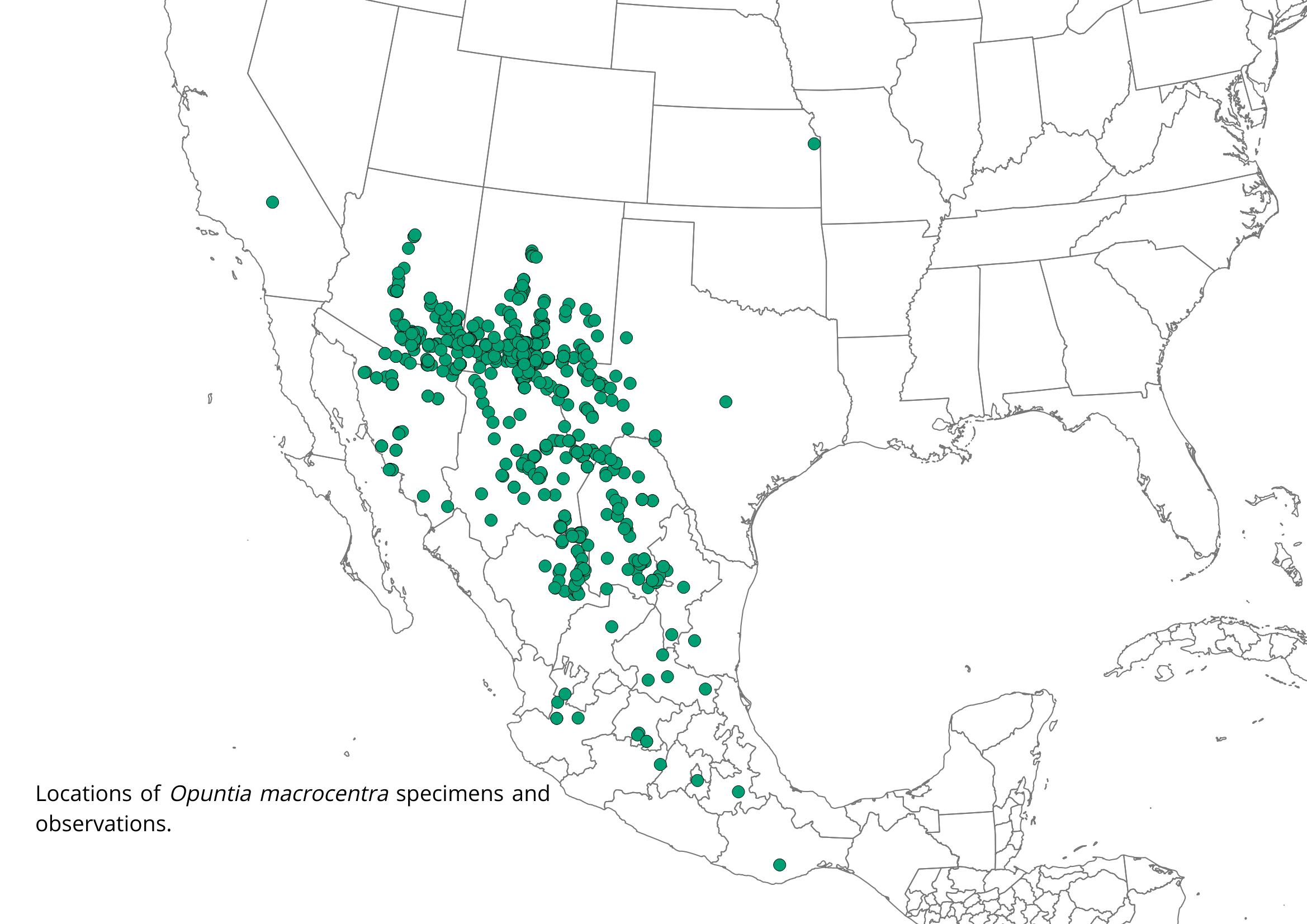
Distribution of Opuntia macrocentra in the United States and Mexico.

Native populations of Opuntia macrocentra are found in Arizona, New Mexico, Southwestern Texas, and Northwestern Mexico.

This cactus is a slow growing perennial that inhabits a wide range of soil substrates and habitat types. It can be found below the elevation of 5000 ft in areas of sandy desert flats, rocky hills, or valley grasslands.

== Description ==
Opuntia macrocentra is an upright spreading shrub, usually growing from 30–60 centimetres (1–2 ft) tall. Individuals occasionally reach 1 metre (1 yard) in height. The stem is blue-gray, blue-green, or purplish in color. The purple pad color is the most intense at the edges of the pad or around the areoles. The purple color comes from the production of a betalain (betacyanin) pigment that becomes more evident as the plant is stressed by drought or cold.

=== Pads ===
The cactus consists of smooth obovate to orbicular shaped pads that are connected to each other by the bottom edge or pad margin. Each pad is from 10–20 centimetres (4–8 in) in width and 10–20 centimetres (4–8 in) in length, but is usually wider than it is long. The areoles, highly reduced branch structures from which spines and glochids grow, are dark in color and can be found arranged in diagonal rows on the midstem segment.

Spines are produced on the upper half or the upper edge only of the pad. Each aerole will have from 1-3 central spines coming from it with the longest being 5–10 centimetres (2–4 in) in length. The largest spine will be pointed in a markedly upward direction. Spines are sometimes seen with a white or yellow tip. Flowers are produced on the upper edge of the pads.

=== Flowers ===
Flowers of Opuntia macrocentra are large sturdy flowers of bright colors. They consist of yellow petals with red lower portions forming a bright red center. The visible internal reproductive structures are pale yellow to cream in color. This cactus produces flowers in spring, usually March through June. The flowers open in the midmorning, close at night and do not reopen.

=== Fruit ===
If the flower is pollinated, the cactus will produce small oval shaped fruits ranging in color from bright red to dull purple when ripe. The fruit produced is succulent and approximately half the size of the flower, from 2.5 to 4.0 centimetres (1 to 1 5/8 in) in length. Each fruit has between 12-16 areoles. The rind of the fruit is purple and the inner pulp and juices are light purple to clear in color. The fruit contains flattened, tan seeds that are less than approximately 4 millimetres (5/32 in) in length with a broad notch on one side and prominent ridge.

== Uses ==
Because of its striking stem and flower color the Opuntia macrocentra cactus is cultivated as an ornamental plant for drought tolerant and native plant gardens, and as a potted plant.

Like many other cacti in the genus Opuntia, the fruit produced by Opuntia macrocentra is edible.

Collection of this cactus, and its fruit, is restricted in some areas for conservation needs.

== Gallery ==
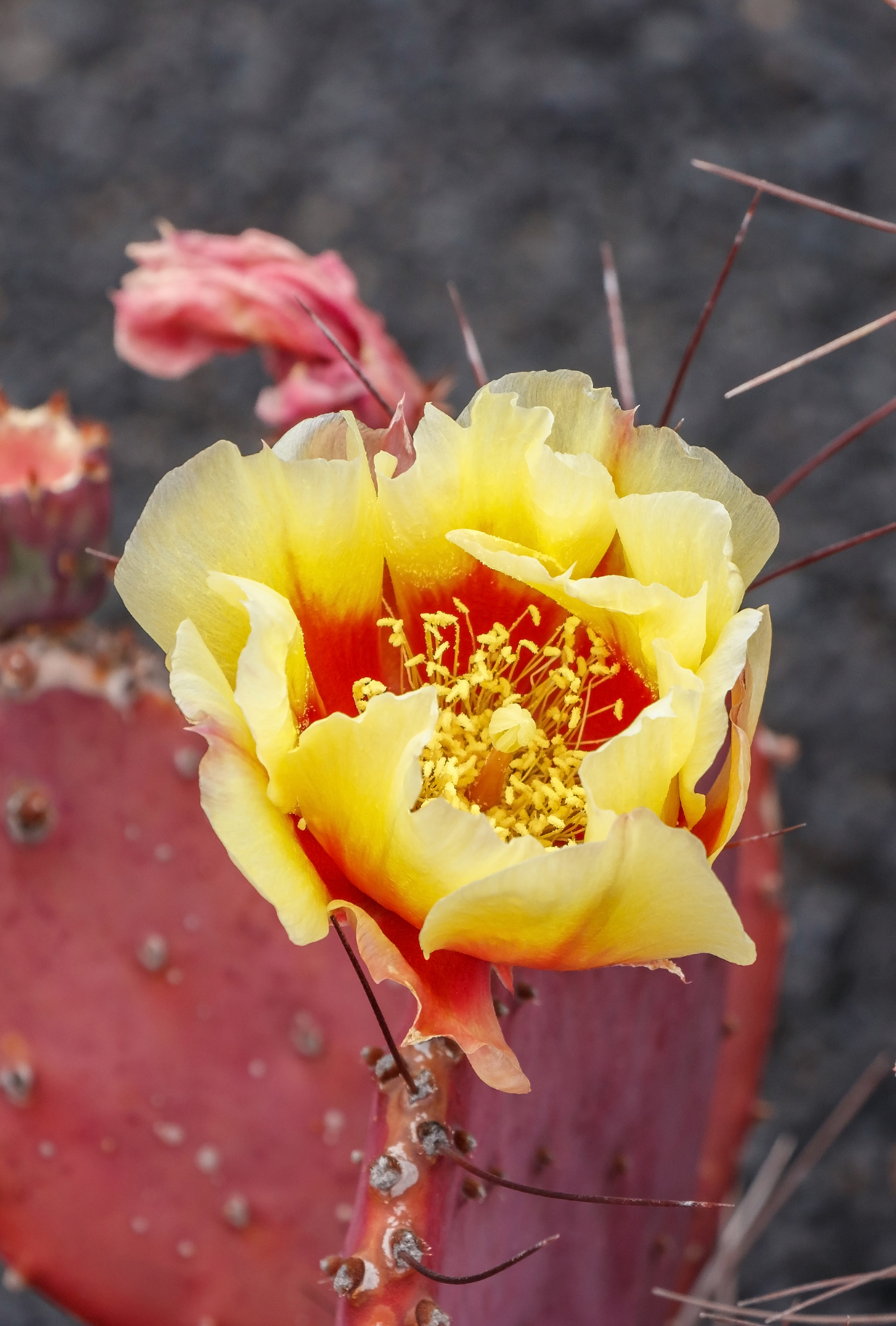
Flower

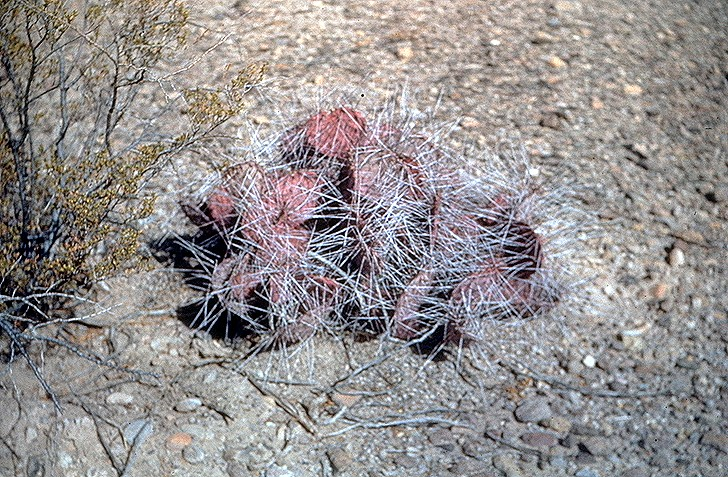
Growth habit of Opuntia macrocentra.

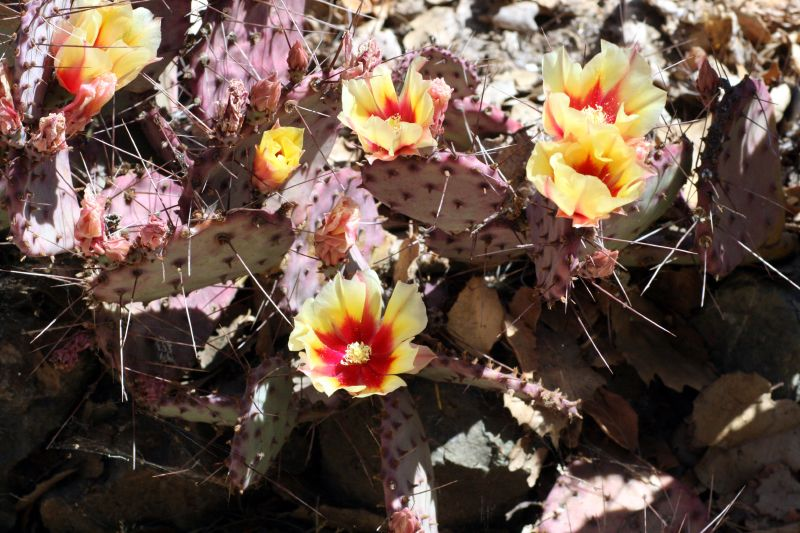
Purple pads and yellow flowers.

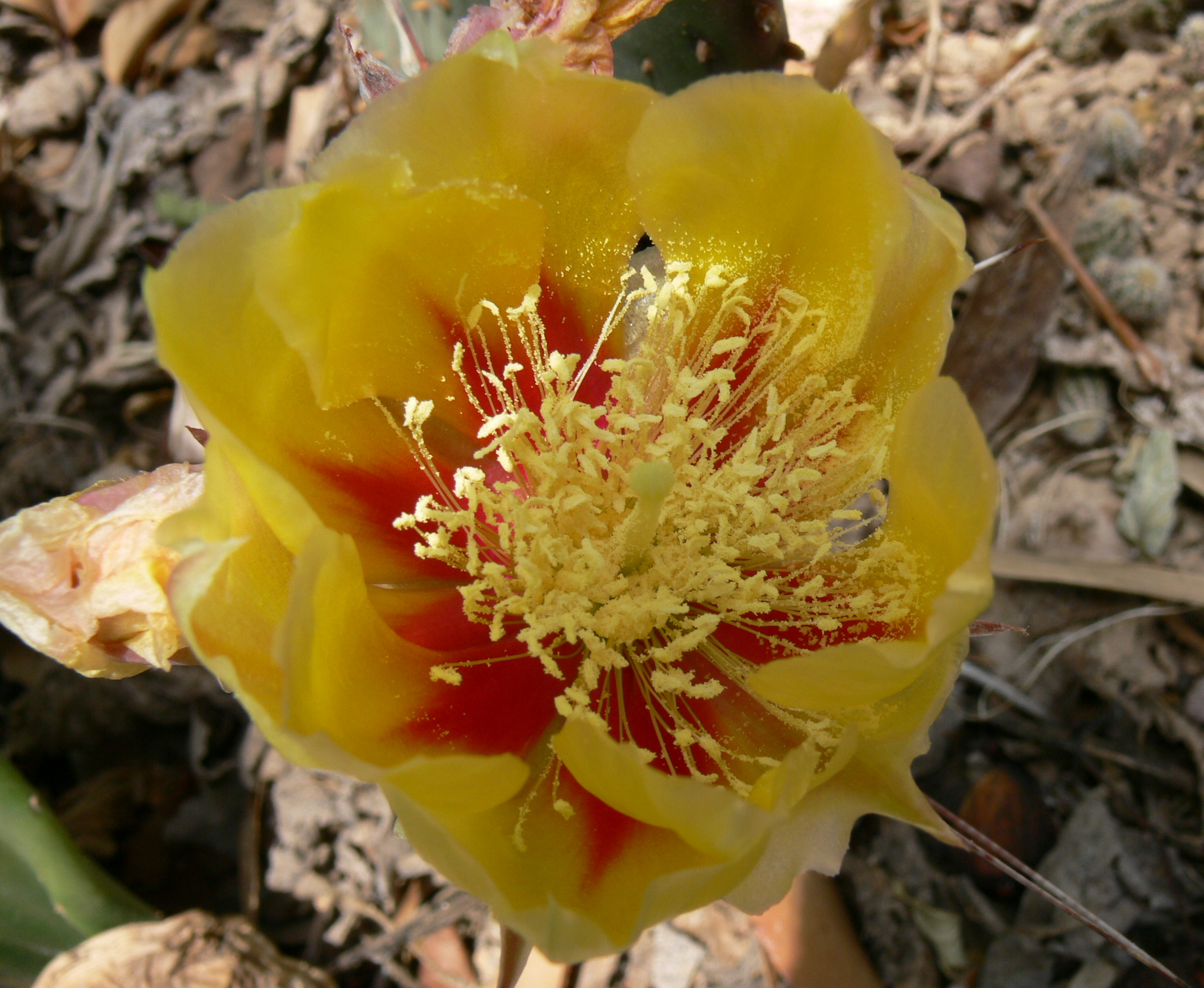
Vivid coloration and multiple stamens of an Opuntia macrocentra flower.
