= John Milton Bigelow =

American physician and botanist (1804–1878)

- Born: June 23, 1804; Vermont, US
- Died: July 18, 1878 (aged 74); Michigan, US
- Spouse: Maria L. Meiers
- Scientific career
- Fields: Botany, Pharmacology
- Workplaces: Detroit Medical College
- Author abbrev. (botany): J.M.Bigelow

John Milton Bigelow (June 23, 1804 – July 18, 1878) was an American medical doctor and botanist. He had a successful medical practice, and also, a keen interest in botany - especially native plants with medical applications. He participated as a botanist and surgeon on two important expeditions through the American Southwest—the Mexican Boundary Survey and the 35th Parallel Expedition for the Pacific Railroad Surveys. He also amassed a significant collection of California plants that yielded many new species. He communicated his botanical results with the three top American botanists of the day, John Torrey, Asa Gray, and George Engelmann. Many of his botanical discoveries were named after or by him. He contributed to the botanical and medical literature of his day.

== Early life ==
He was a 7th generation descendant of English immigrant John Biglo, who settled in Watertown, Massachusetts ca. 1632. Soon after his birth in Peru, Vermont, his family moved to central Ohio, where he was schooled. He took up teaching to gain the funds to attend the Medical College of Ohio in Cincinnati, from which he graduated with an MD degree in 1832. At the college he also became interested in botany, possibly under the special influence of one of the lecturers. John Riddell has been suggested, but that is not certain. Soon after graduation he married Maria L. Meiers of Lancaster, Ohio. He and his wife settled in Lancaster where he took up medical practice, and soon began county-wide botanical studies.

== Ohio medical botanist ==
Bigelow resided in Lancaster for nearly three decades, though absenting himself to participate in government-led western explorations in the 1850s. He and his wife had eight children, born between c. 1834 and c. 1848. A son, Rev. Francis C. Bigelow, C.S.C, became a professor at Notre Dame University. A daughter became Sister Blanche of the Sisters of the Holy Cross, of Notre Dame, Indiana.

In his early years, in addition to establishing a medical practice, he spent much time becoming familiar with the flora of central Ohio, joining with other local physicians and William Starling Sullivant, a prominent botanist residing in the area. Sullivant specialized in the study of bryophytes, but had broad botanical interests, and was in close contact with John Torrey and Asa Gray.

In those days and later, Bigelow often championed, among his fellow medical practitioners, the usage of medicinal plants. This was in the spirit of Materia Medica and Herbalism, practices going back many centuries. (A contemporary movement is documented by an Elsevier peer-reviewed journal: Phytomedicine.) In an 1841 presentation to the Medical Convention of Ohio (see Works, 1841) he stated that Botany was the most important science "collateral to medicine", but that most members of the profession were "careless" or "indifferent" regarding it. He later prepared, at the request of his colleagues, a list of the medicinal plants of Ohio, which appeared in 1849 (see Works).

== Surgeon botanist on Western US Survey expeditions ==
=== The United States and Mexican Boundary Survey ===
In 1850 (following some early confusion), Bigelow joined the Mexican Boundary Survey to serve as both surgeon and botanist on the expedition led by Major William H. Emory. Recognizing the survey as an opportunity for botanical exploration, John Torrey and Asa Gray had lobbied to include botanists in the survey parties, which would be crossing territory unknown to science. Bigelow was recommended to the position by his friend Sullivant. Other botanists on the expedition included Charles C. Parry, George Thurber, and Charles Wright. The resulting botanical report, Botany of the Boundary, compiled principally by John Torrey, classified some 2,600 plants collected on the survey; it was the largest survey of plants undertaken in the US up to that time. One of Bigelow's most notable plant discoveries was Parthenium argentatum, a rubber-yielding plant known as 'guayule'.

=== The 35th Parallel Pacific Railroad Survey ===
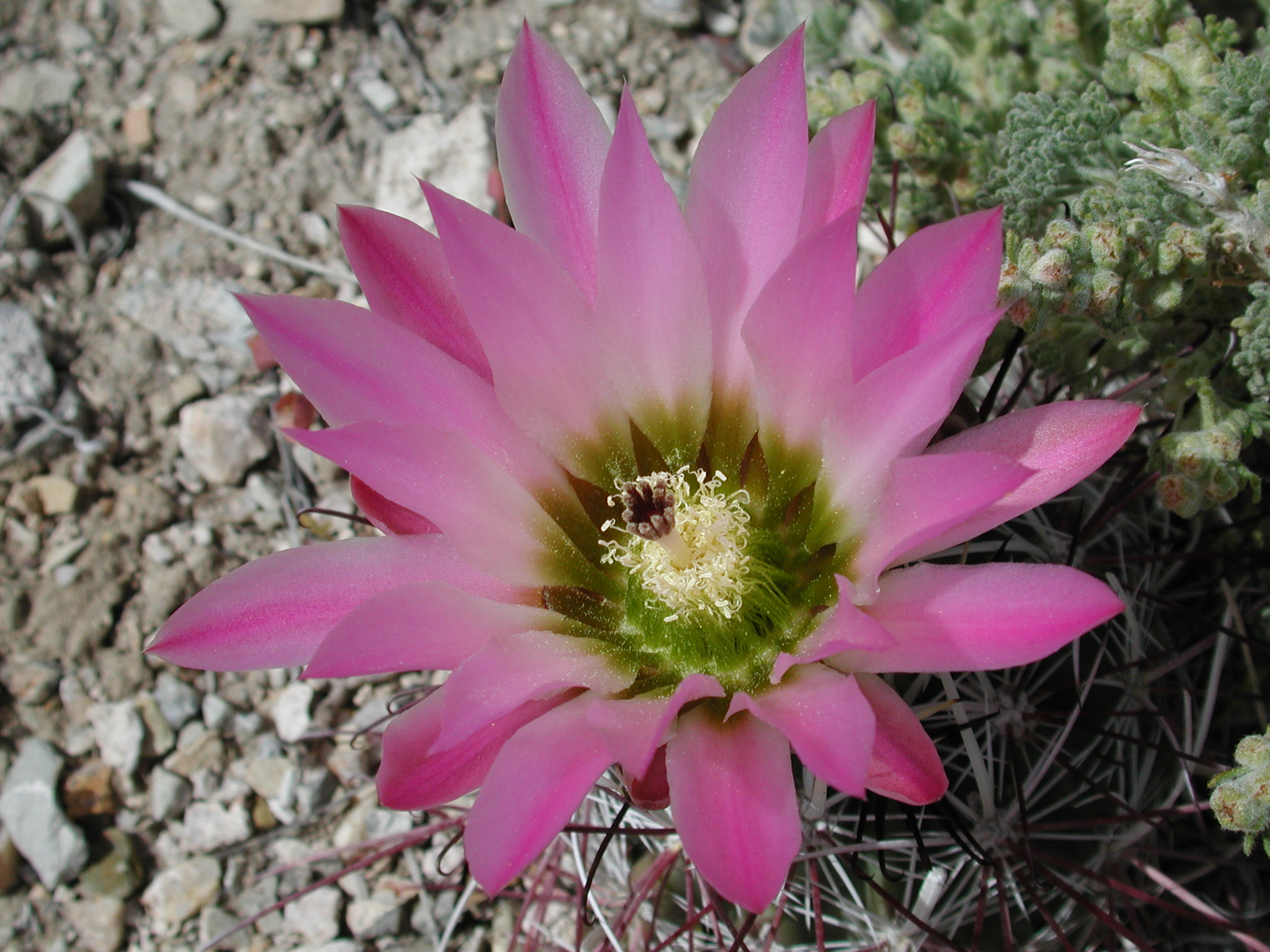
Sclerocactus polyancistrus (Engelm. & J.M.Bigelow) Britton & Rose, first collected by J.M.Bigelow March 15, 1854, while with the Whipple Survey near Cajon Pass, CA

Bigelow joined the Pacific Railroad Survey which explored along the 35th parallel, led by Lt. Amiel Weeks Whipple. The expedition got under way in 1853, with Bigelow serving as surgeon and botanist. Balduin Möllhausen served as naturalist and artist for the group. Bigelow and Möllhausen often explored the countryside together. In his diary of the expedition (including a preface by his mentor Alexander von Humboldt), Möllhausen records many of their exploits. Möllhausen described Bigelow as a congenial colleague in the field, "a general favourite and by far the oldest [49] of the party. ... [with] a pattern of gentleness and patience ... not only a zealous botanist, but also an enthusiastic sportsman. ... To his patients he was most kind and attentive, and of his mule, Billy, he made an absolute spoiled child."

The expedition reached Los Angeles on March 20, 1854.

==== California Collections ====
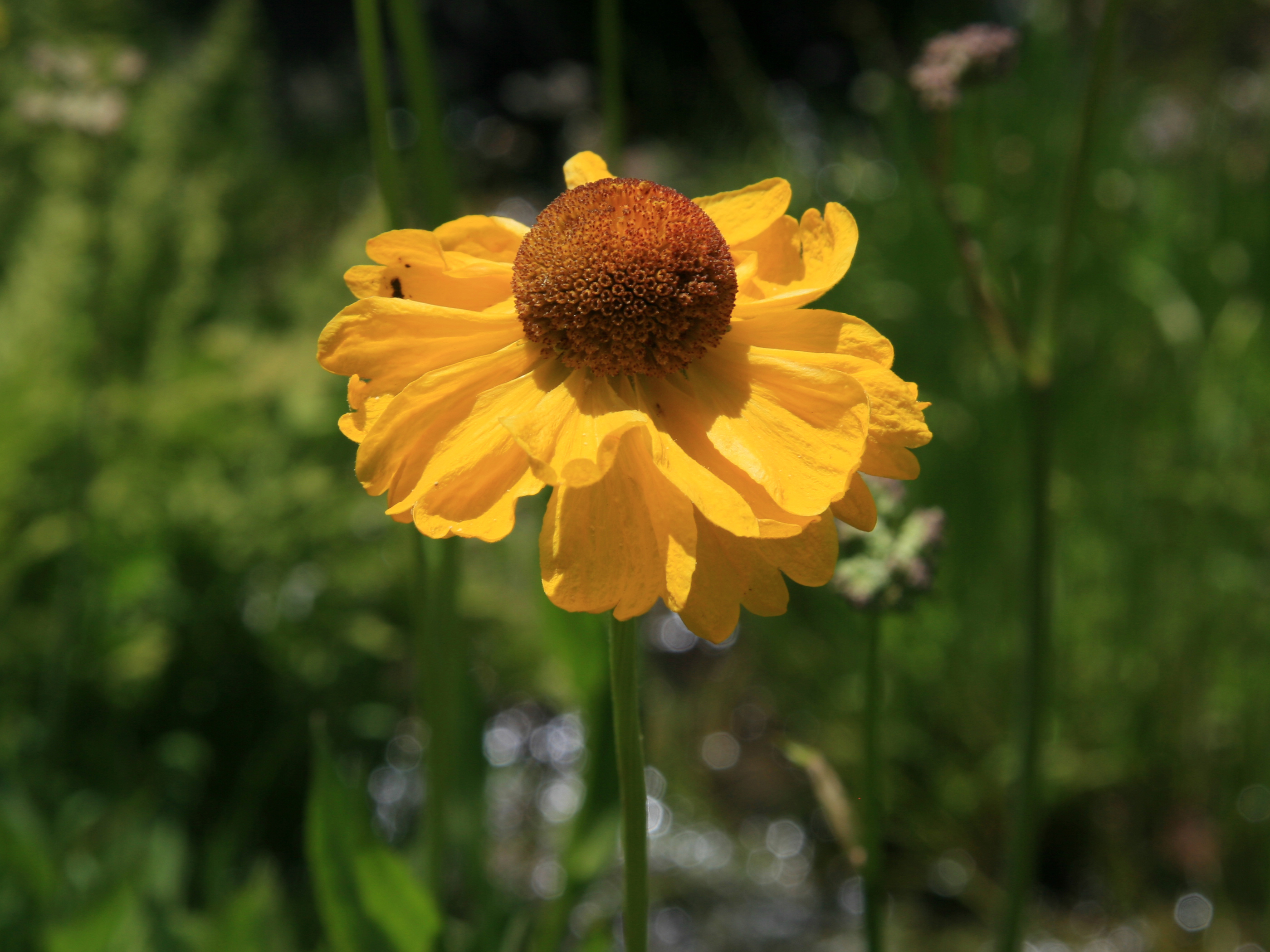
Helenium bigelovii A. Gray, California

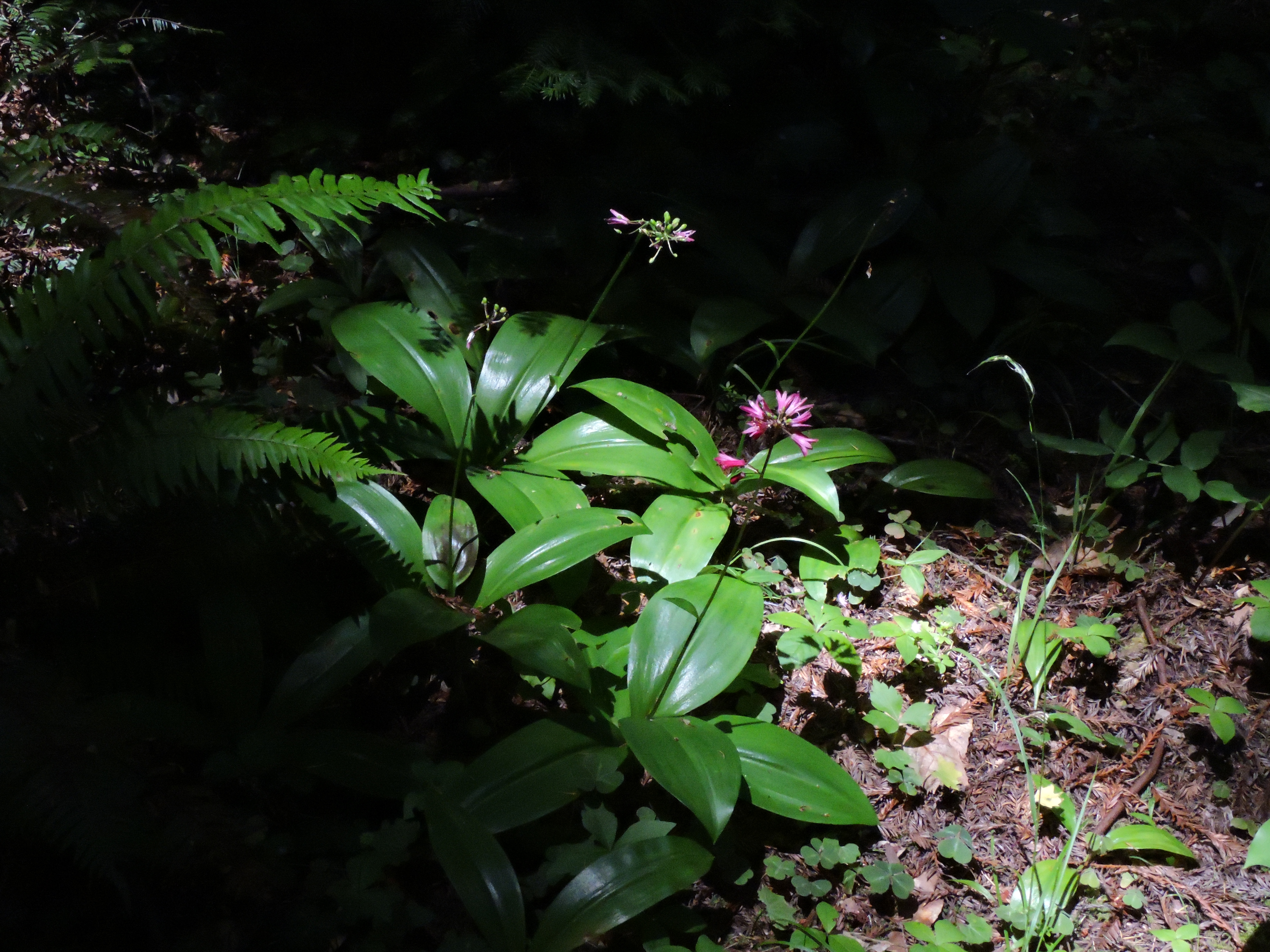
Red Clintonia, endemic to Coast Redwood forests, first collected, by Bigelow, in 1854

On March 24 most members of the expedition left Los Angeles for San Francisco, where they would take a steamer to Panama, and thence back to Washington, D.C. Because of the season though, so conducive to growth and bloom of native plants, Bigelow decided to remain and botanize this mid-section of California, a state only recently admitted to the US. Distinguished California botanist Willis Linn Jepson, near the end of an essay on Bigelow, notes that he " . . . was so fortunate as to view a considerable part of California while its native vegetation was still in nearly pristine freshness." He had botanized, over most of April and May, 1854, from the coast and across the Central Valley to the Sierra Nevada. Jepson noted that "The name of Bigelow is associated with many of the early discovered plant species of California." Red clintonia (Clintonia andrewsiana) was among them, "this interesting plant found by Dr. Bigelow" (see, p. 94[150]).

==== The Report on the Botany of the Survey ====
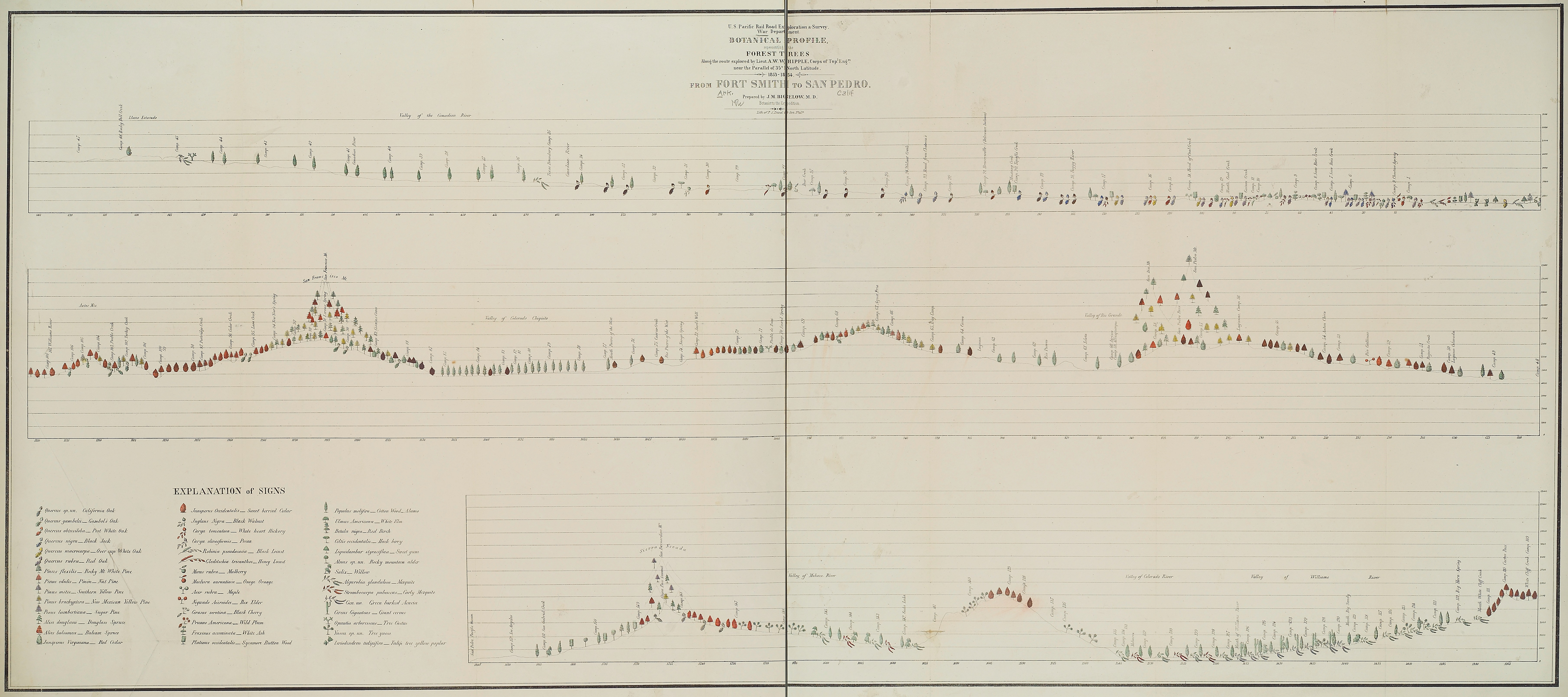
Botanical profile representing the forest trees along the route explored by Lieut. A.W. Whipple

In July 1854 Bigelow and the other members of the expedition met in Washington, D.C. to prepare their reports for publication. The result, dated 1856, begins with a general account, by Bigelow, of the topography and climate of the region; in a following chapter he discussed forest trees encountered (important knowledge for the construction of a railroad in those days), and devised a graphical description of tree distribution, in a manner originated by Alexander von Humboldt (see Phytogeography); a chapter by George Engelmann, coauthored by Bigelow, describes Bigelow's extensive collection of cacti; a description of Bigelow's collections of ferns and flowering plants by John Torrey ensues, by far the longest chapter, with many plant illustrations; the botany report ends with Sullivant's description of the mosses Bigelow collected. Torrey stated that Bigelow's collections were "brought home in perfect order" affording "abundant proof of the zeal and success with which he labored. A number of new genera, and more than sixty new species, have been discovered by Dr. Bigelow, and he has added much valuable information upon many heretofore imperfectly known plants."

== Back to Ohio ==
After the report had been completed and the authors dispersed, Möllhausen wrote in his diary (vol 2, p 388) "Whether I may ever again meet with any of my old comrades seems uncertain, for our merry party has been scattered to all points of the compass. My dear and worthy friend Dr. Bigelow is now living happily in his family circle in Ohio and employing his leisure hours in botanising excursions about the country . . .". This was written ca 1857 when Bigelow's children would have ranged from about 10 to 24 years of age. According to advertisements placed in the Lancaster Gazette newspaper, Bigelow had returned to Lancaster to reestablish his medical practice in 1856. However, in late 1860, he requested those "indebted to him" to immediately settle their debts. His house was noted for sale in 1867.

== Detroit ==
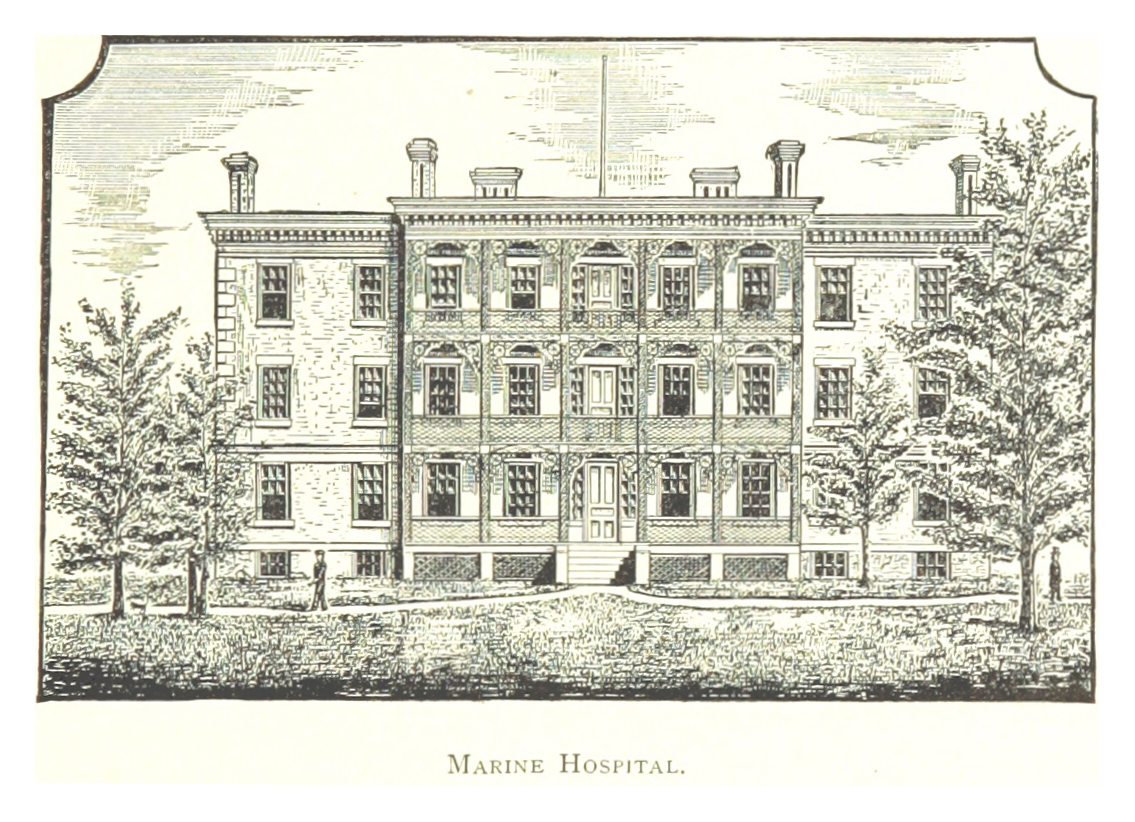
Detroit Marine Hospital

In 1860 "Bigelow was placed in charge of the meteorological division" of the United States Lake Survey, a position he retained until January 1, 1867. In 1869, Bigelow, then a member of the Michigan State Medical Society, was one of eight medical practitioners who founded the Detroit Academy of Medicine. He served as "surgeon in charge" of the Detroit Marine Hospital, 1869–1873.

Crude preparations of opium, highly variable in effect, were widely used in Bigelow's time. In his later years in Detroit he partnered with a chemist to work out a method of making a more consistent preparation, which they called Svapnia (see Works, 1869). It was marketed as "Svapnia--Bigelow's Purified Opium".

After retirement, he moved to a farm outside Detroit. While there he suffered an injury which led to his death on July 18, 1878. He was survived by his wife and family.

Obituary remarks: ". . . the refined and scholarly physician, who won the admiring esteem and even the veneration of all who approached him."; "He always impressed me by his singular modesty, never permitting his attainments to obtrude themselves in a pretentious way, while his uprightness and meekness of manner gave to him that attractiveness which arrested the attention of those who were at all acquainted with him."; "The modesty that graced his every act, the tender and delicate feeling that smoothed and made delightful his intercourse with his professional brethren, shall ever endear him in our memory."

== Image ==
Perhaps his lack of self-aggrandizement accounts for the fact that no pictures of him seem to exist. A tribute to the eight founding members of the Detroit Academy of Medicine pictures seven of the founders, but not Bigelow. (Note: There is an image of a New York State MD born in 1847 also named John Milton Bigelow.)

== Works ==
- Bigelow, John Milton; Hor(r), Asa (1841). Florula Lancastriensis, Or, A Catalogue, Comprising Nearly All the Flowering and Filicoid Plants, Growing Naturally Within the Limits of Fairfield County. Lancaster, OH: Wright & Legg.
- Bigelow, J. M. (1843). "On the Topography, etc., of Fairfield County, O". The Western Lancet. 2 (8): 345–360.
- Bigelow, John M. (1849). A list of the medicinal plants of Ohio (not embraced in Wood & Bache's U. S. Dispensatory): containing, as far as known, a brief account of their properties. Columbus, OH: J. H. Riley & Co.
- Bigelow, J. M. 1856. Volume IV, Part V, No. 1. General Description of the Botanical Character of the Country, No. 2. Description of Forest Trees, and No 3 (co-authored with Engelmann, George). Description of the Cactaceae. IN Reports of Explorations and Surveys [35th parallel, Director Lt. A. W. Whipple, 1853 and 1854]. pp. 1–58. U. S. War Department, Washington, D. C. Online. Washington, D.C. 2019-03-05.
- Bigelow, J. M. (1866). "Loganiacae--the Strychnine Family". Detroit Review of Medicine and Pharmacy. I (2): 109–113.
- Bigelow, J. M. (1867). "Sargassum Bacciferum, Agardh". Detroit Review of Medicine and Pharmacy. II (1, 2): 16–21, 54–61.
- Bigelow, J. M. (1867). "The Medical Botany, Topography and Climate, of the Southwestern States and Territories". Detroit Review of Medicine and Pharmacy. II: 155–162, 199–202, 245–251, 299–305, 357–360.
- Bigelow, J. M. (1868). "The Medical Botany, Topography and Climate, of the Southwestern States and Territories". Detroit Review of Medicine and Pharmacy. III (1): 4–11.
- Bigelow, J. M. (1869). "Svapnia, or Purified Opium". Detroit Review of Medicine and Pharmacy. IV (1): 3–13.
