= Desert prickly pear =

Desert prickly pear is a common name for several plants and may refer to:

- Opuntia engelmannii, native to the United States and northern Mexico
- Opuntia phaeacantha
