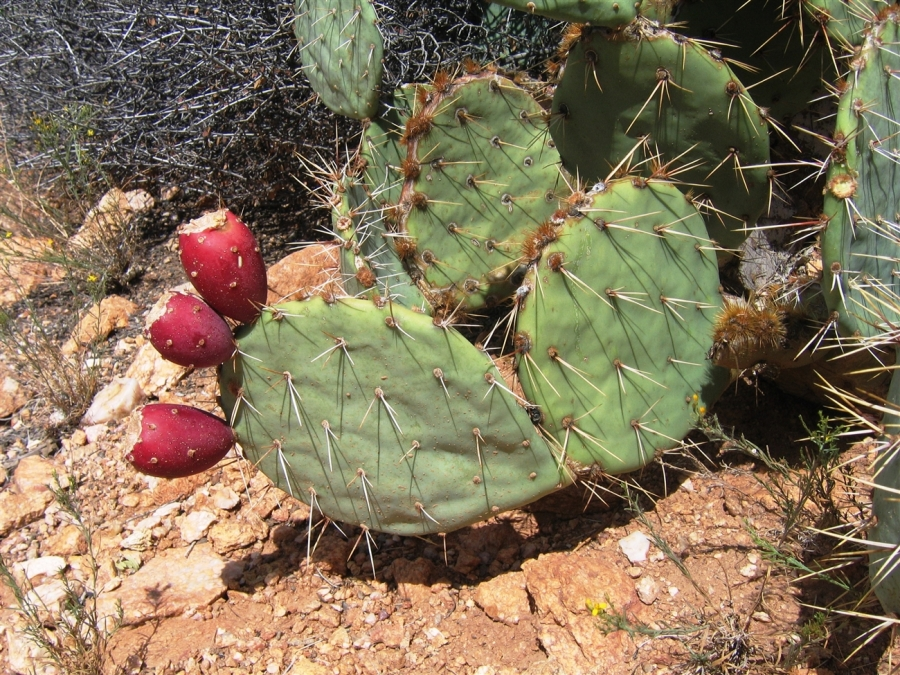

Scientific classification
- Kingdom: Plantae
- Clade: Tracheophytes
- Clade: Angiosperms
- Clade: Eudicots
- Order: Caryophyllales
- Family: Cactaceae
- Genus: Opuntia
- Species: O. dulcis

Binomial name
- Opuntia dulcis Engelm.

Synonyms
- List: Opuntia phaeacantha var. major Engelm. (1856); Opuntia eocarpa Griffiths (1916)

= Opuntia dulcis =

Species of cactus

Opuntia dulcis is a cactus native to United States and Mexico.

== Description ==
The plant O. dulcis has been described as a variety of, and is confused with, O. phaeacantha. However, O. dulcis is a larger plant with ascending branches, to 2 ft (exceptionally 4 ft). While it is a larger plant, immature specimens of O. dulcis may overlap in size with O. phaeacantha. Opuntia dulcis resembles O. engelmannii in some ways but does not become as erect or large as that species. Also, the spines of O. dulcis are finer than those of O. engelmannii.

== Distribution and habitat ==
O. dulcis is found across the deserts of the southwestern United States and northern Mexico. It is common in Trans-Pecos Texas, New Mexico, and Arizona. It has been observed in the mountains of southern Nevada.

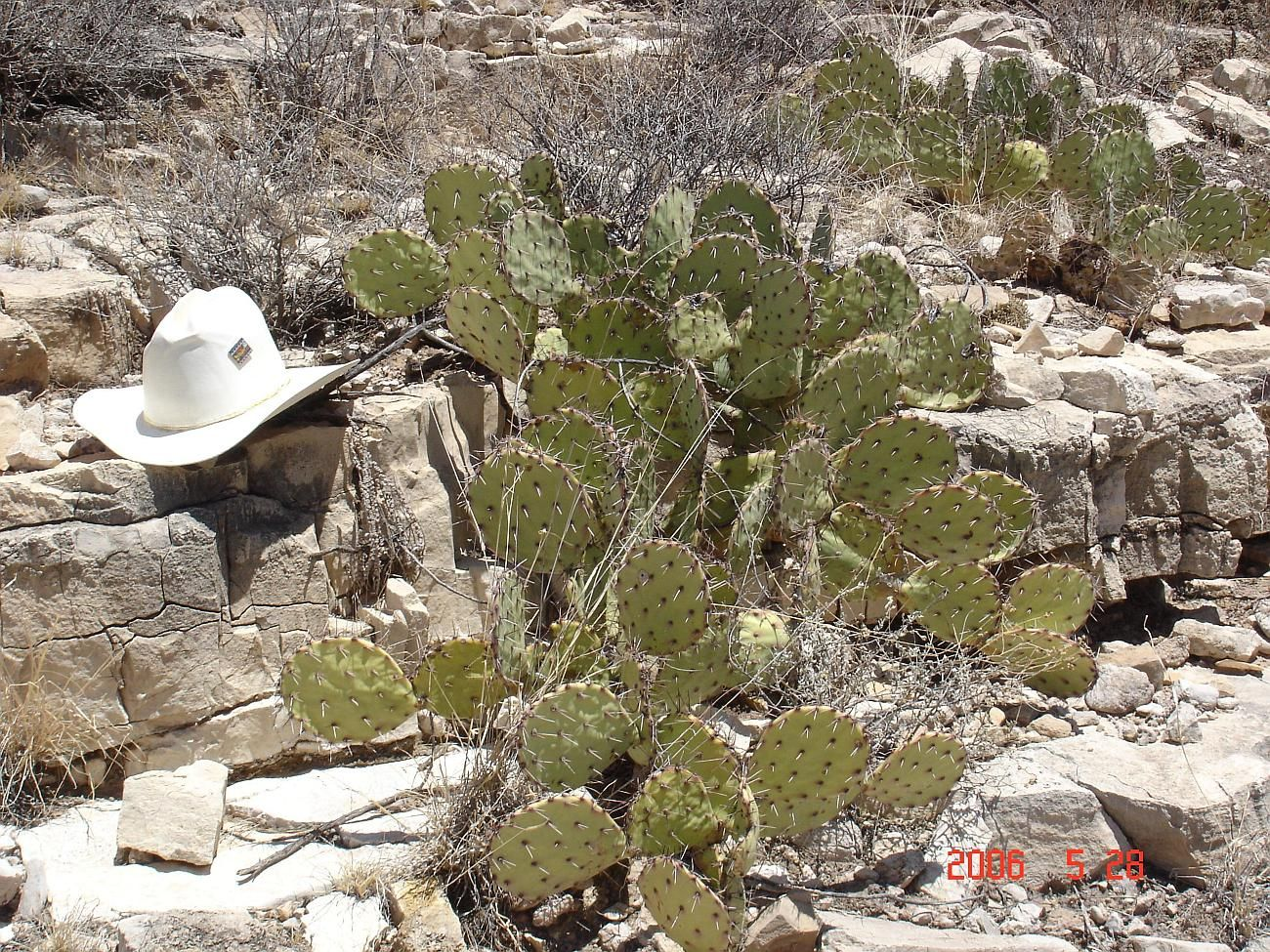
Opuntia dulcis near Artesia, New Mexico
