= Narnia (disambiguation) =

Narnia is a fictional universe in The Chronicles of Narnia, a 1950s fantasy novel series by C. S. Lewis.

Narnia may also refer to:

- The Chronicles of Narnia, the book series itself
- The Chronicles of Narnia (film series), 2005–2010
- The Chronicles of Narnia (TV series), 1988–1990

== Music ==
- Narnia (band), a Swedish Christian metal band
- "Narnia", a track on Please Don't Touch!, a 1978 Steve Hackett album
- "Narnia", a 2007 Born of Osiris demo that became "The Takeover"

== Other uses ==
- Narnia (bug), an insect genus
- Narni (Latin: Narnia), an ancient hilltown in central Italy
