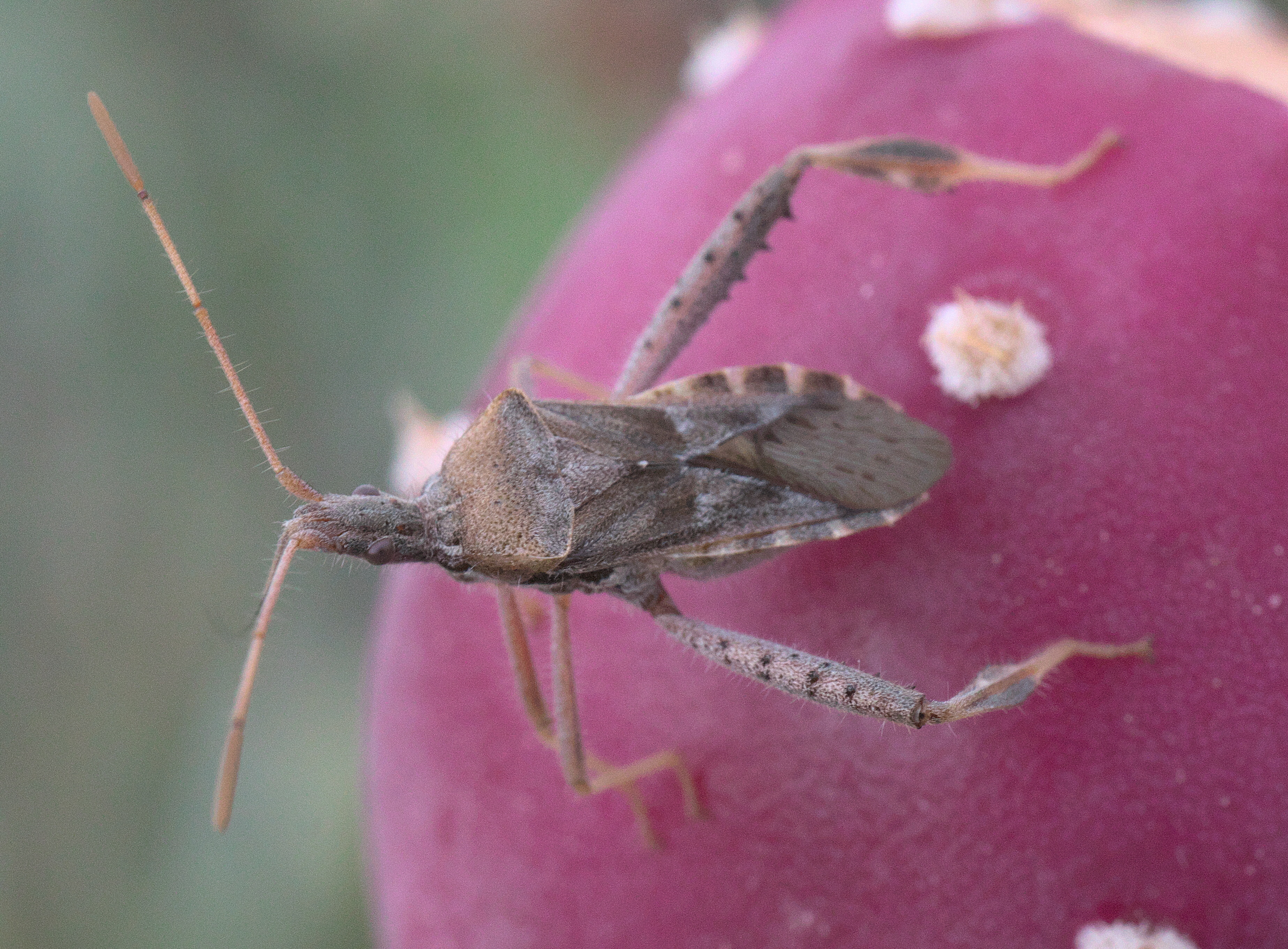

Scientific classification
- Domain: Eukaryota
- Kingdom: Animalia
- Phylum: Arthropoda
- Class: Insecta
- Order: Hemiptera
- Suborder: Heteroptera
- Family: Coreidae
- Genus: Narnia
- Species: N. femorata

Binomial name
- Narnia femorata Stål, 1862

Synonyms
- Narnia pallidicornis Stål, 1870

= Narnia femorata =

Species of true bug

Narnia femorata is a species of leaf-footed bug in the family Coreidae. It is found in Central America and North America. It feeds on cacti, including Opuntia phaeacantha, Ferocactus wislizeni, and Saguaro, as well as Cirsium thistle.
