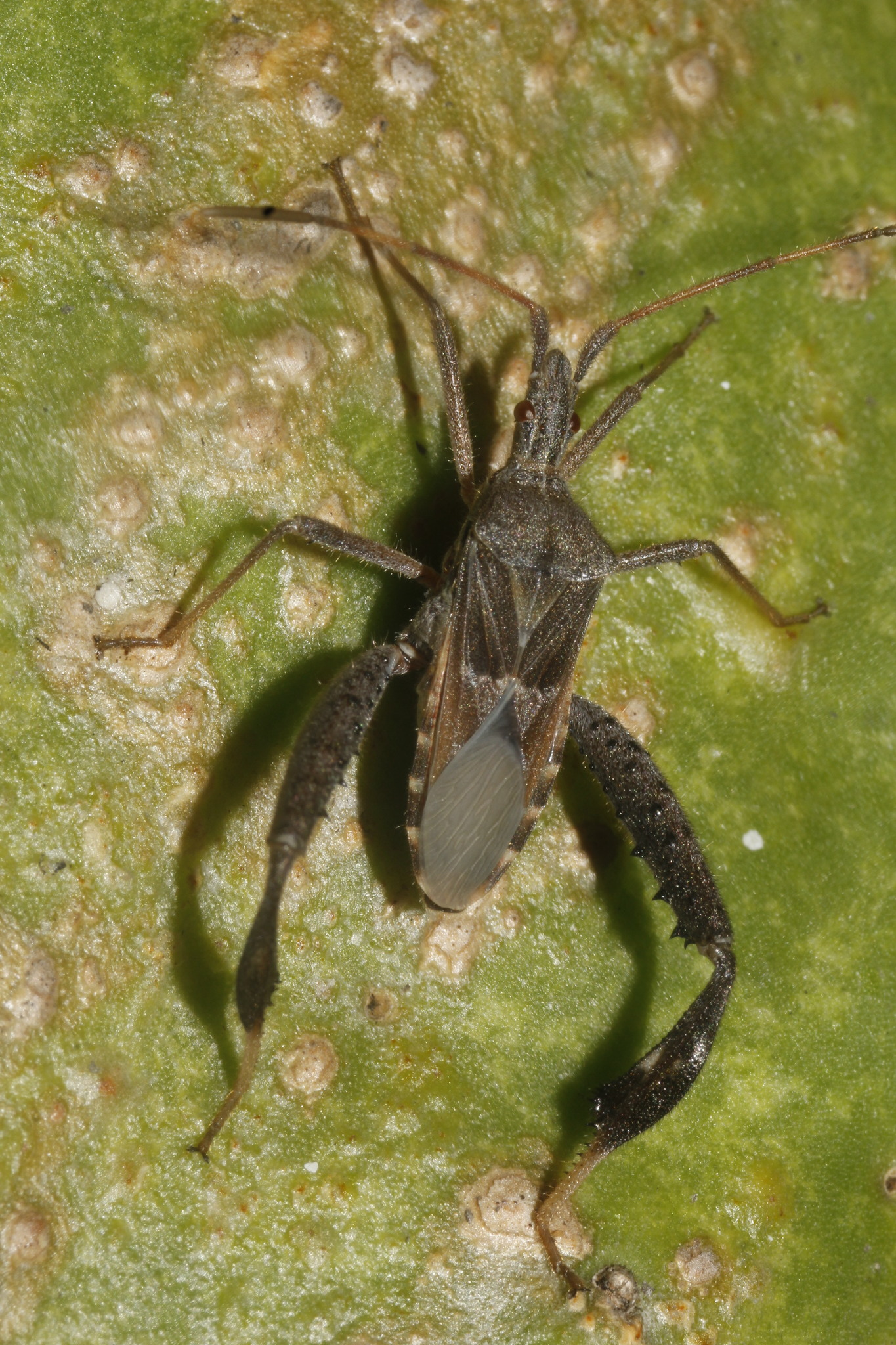
- Narnia inornata, México

Scientific classification
- Kingdom: Animalia
- Phylum: Arthropoda
- Class: Insecta
- Order: Hemiptera
- Suborder: Heteroptera
- Family: Coreidae
- Genus: Narnia
- Species: N. inornata

Binomial name
- Narnia inornata Distant, 1892

= Narnia inornata =

Species of true bugs

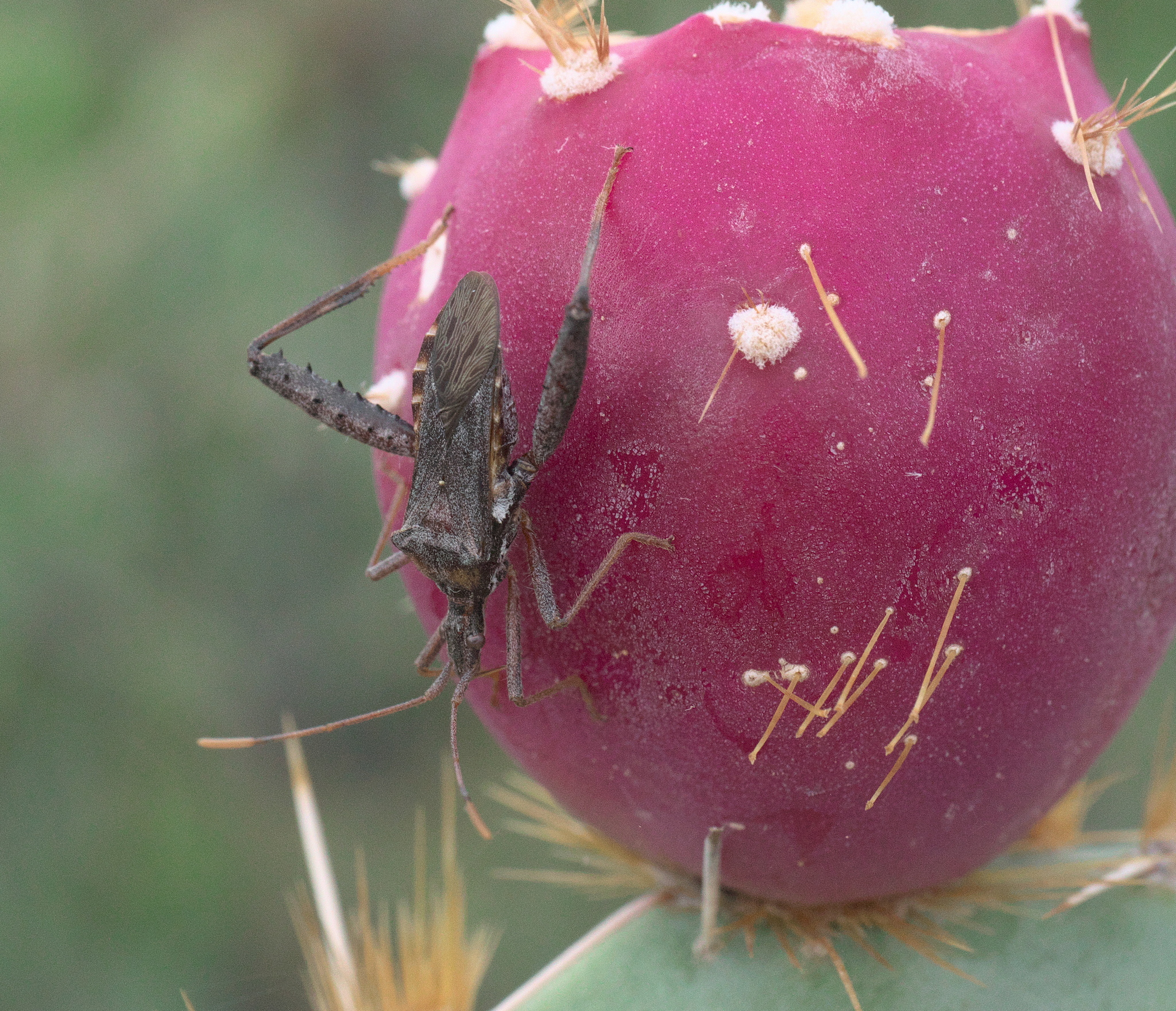
Narnia inornata, Arizona

Narnia inornata is a species of leaf-footed bug in the family Coreidae, found in the southwestern United States and Mexico.

They feed on the fruit and joints of cactus, such as prickly pear and cholla.
