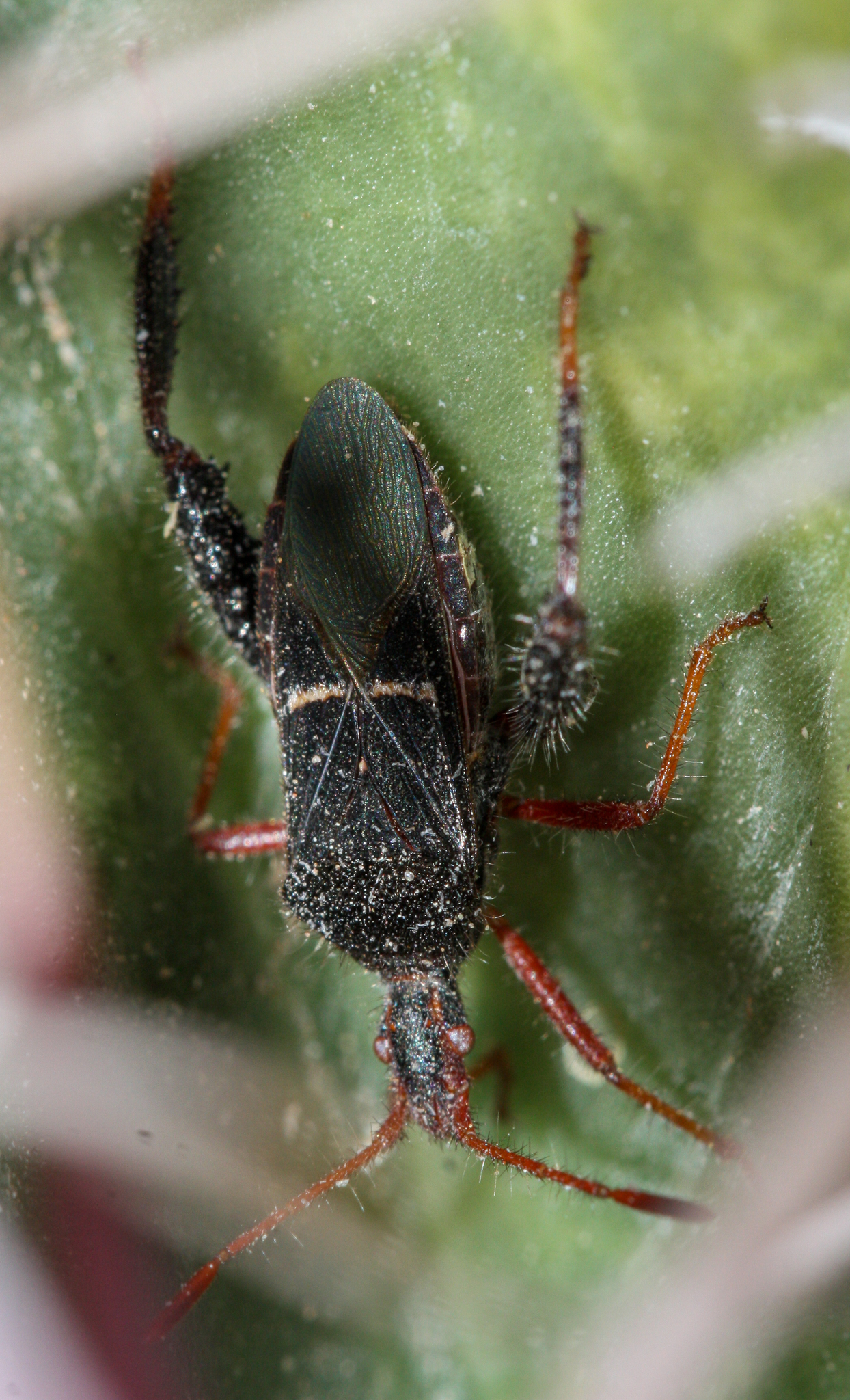

Scientific classification
- Domain: Eukaryota
- Kingdom: Animalia
- Phylum: Arthropoda
- Class: Insecta
- Order: Hemiptera
- Suborder: Heteroptera
- Family: Coreidae
- Genus: Narnia
- Species: N. wilsoni

Binomial name
- Narnia wilsoni Van Duzee, 1906

= Narnia wilsoni =

Species of true bug

Narnia wilsoni is a species of leaf-footed bug in the family Coreidae. It is found in North America.
