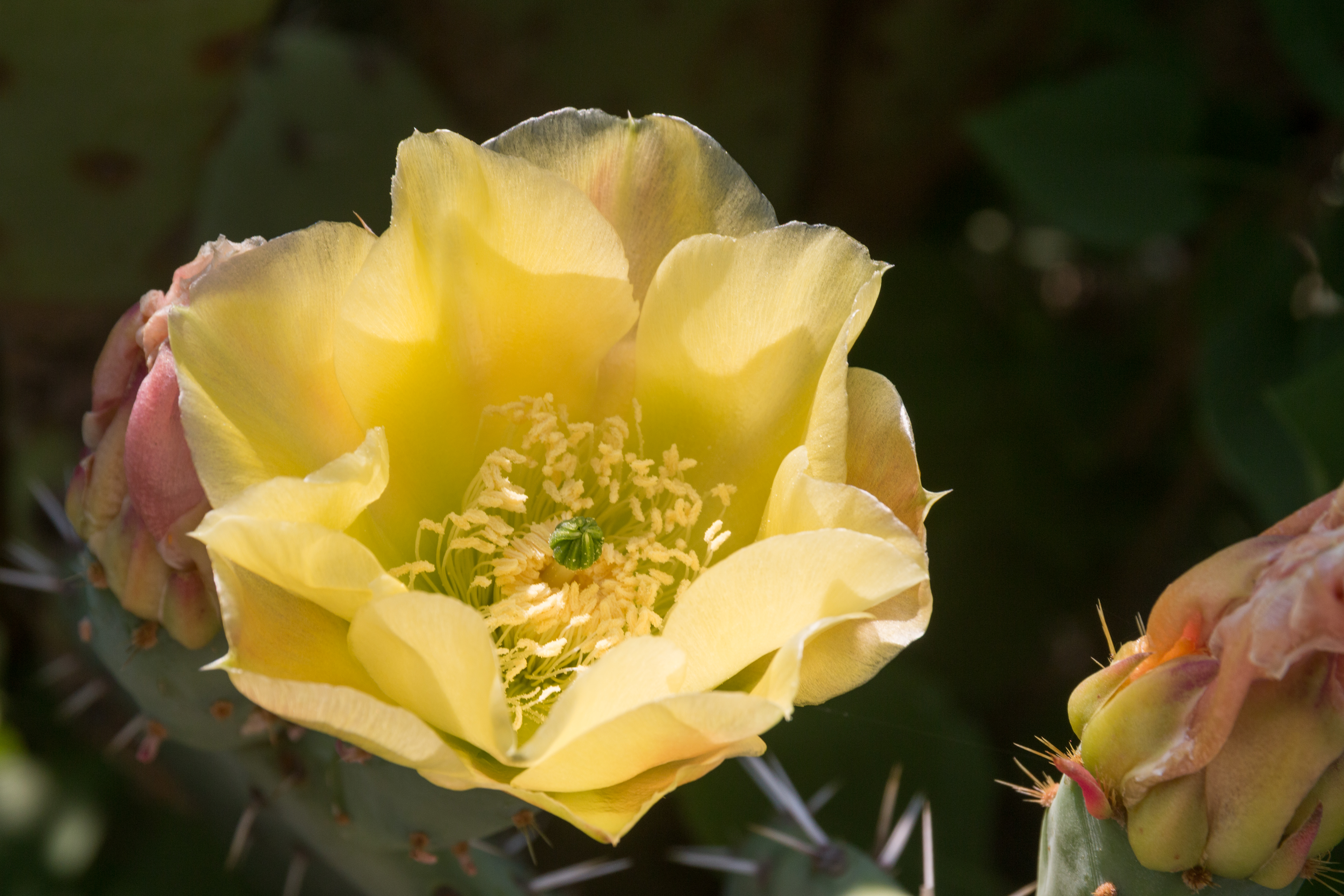

Conservation status
- Least Concern (IUCN 3.1)

Scientific classification
- Kingdom: Plantae
- Clade: Tracheophytes
- Clade: Angiosperms
- Clade: Eudicots
- Order: Caryophyllales
- Family: Cactaceae
- Genus: Opuntia
- Species: O. engelmannii

Binomial name
- Opuntia engelmannii Salm-Dyck ex Engelmann

Synonyms
- Opuntia engelmanni (a common lapsus)

= Opuntia engelmannii =

Species of cactus

Opuntia engelmannii is a prickly pear common across the south-central and Southwestern United States and northern Mexico. It goes by a variety of common names, including desert prickly pear, discus prickly pear, Engelmann's prickly pear in the US, and nopal, abrojo, joconostle, and vela de coyote in Mexico.

The nomenclatural history of this species is somewhat complicated due to the varieties, as well as its habit of hybridizing with Opuntia phaeacantha. It differs from O. phaeacantha by being green year round instead of turning reddish purple during winter or dry seasons, as well as having yellow flowers with red centers.

== Varieties ==
- O. engelmannii var. cuija — nopal cuijo; endemic to Mexico, in Guanajuato, Hidalgo, San Luis Potosí.
- O. engelmannii var. engelmannii — Engelmann's prickly pear; Mexico, southwestern U.S., California
- O. engelmannii var. flavispina — yellow-spined prickly pear; Arizona, Mexico
- O. engelmannii var. laevis — smooth prickly pear; Arizona
- O. engelmannii var. lindheimeri — Texas prickly pear; endemic to U.S. in Louisiana, New Mexico, Oklahoma, Texas.
- O. engelmannii var. linguiformis — cow's tongue cactus, cow tongue prickly pear; Texas

O. engelmannii var. flexospina is most likely a spiny form of Opuntia aciculata.

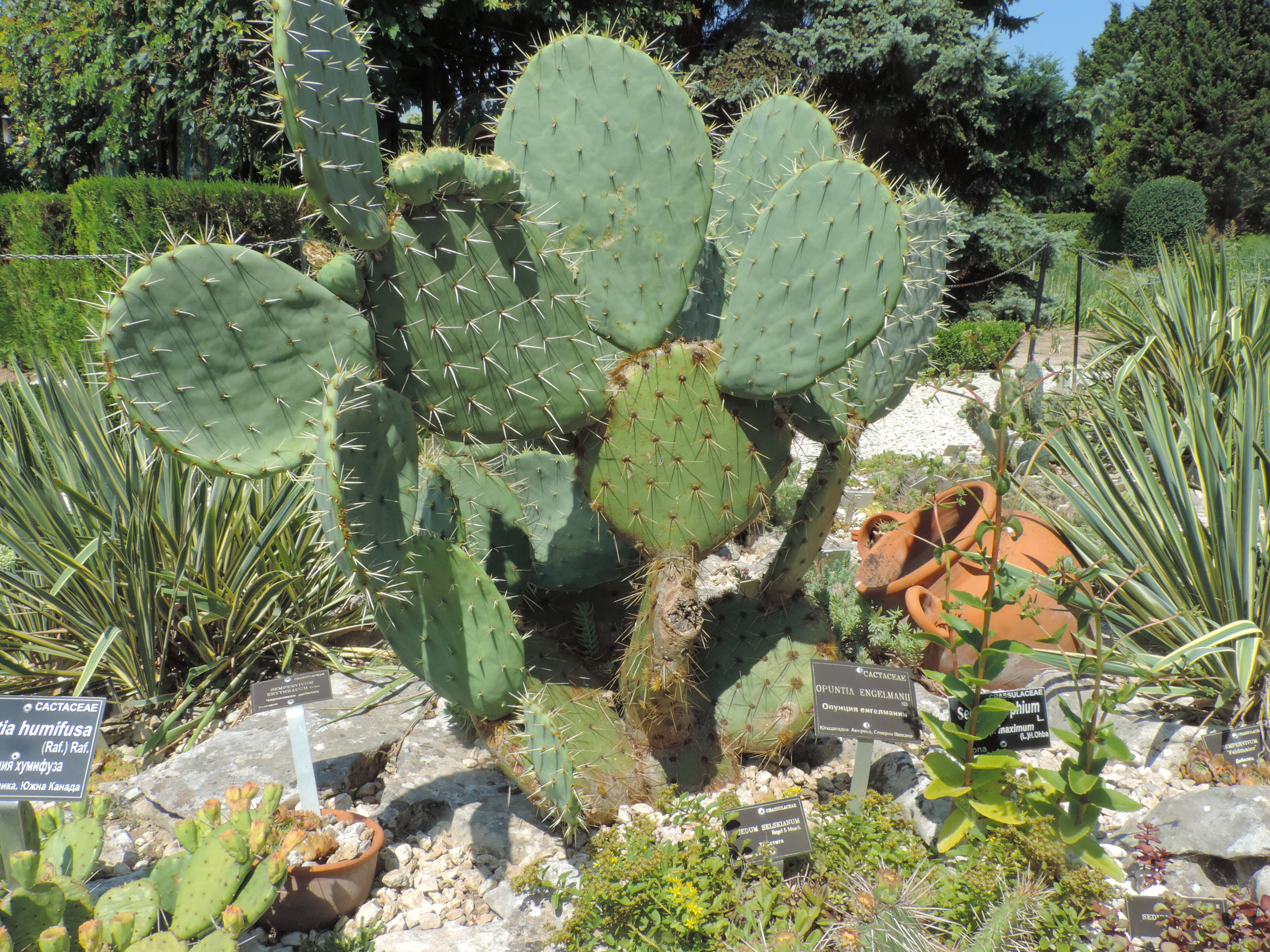
O. e. var. engelmannii

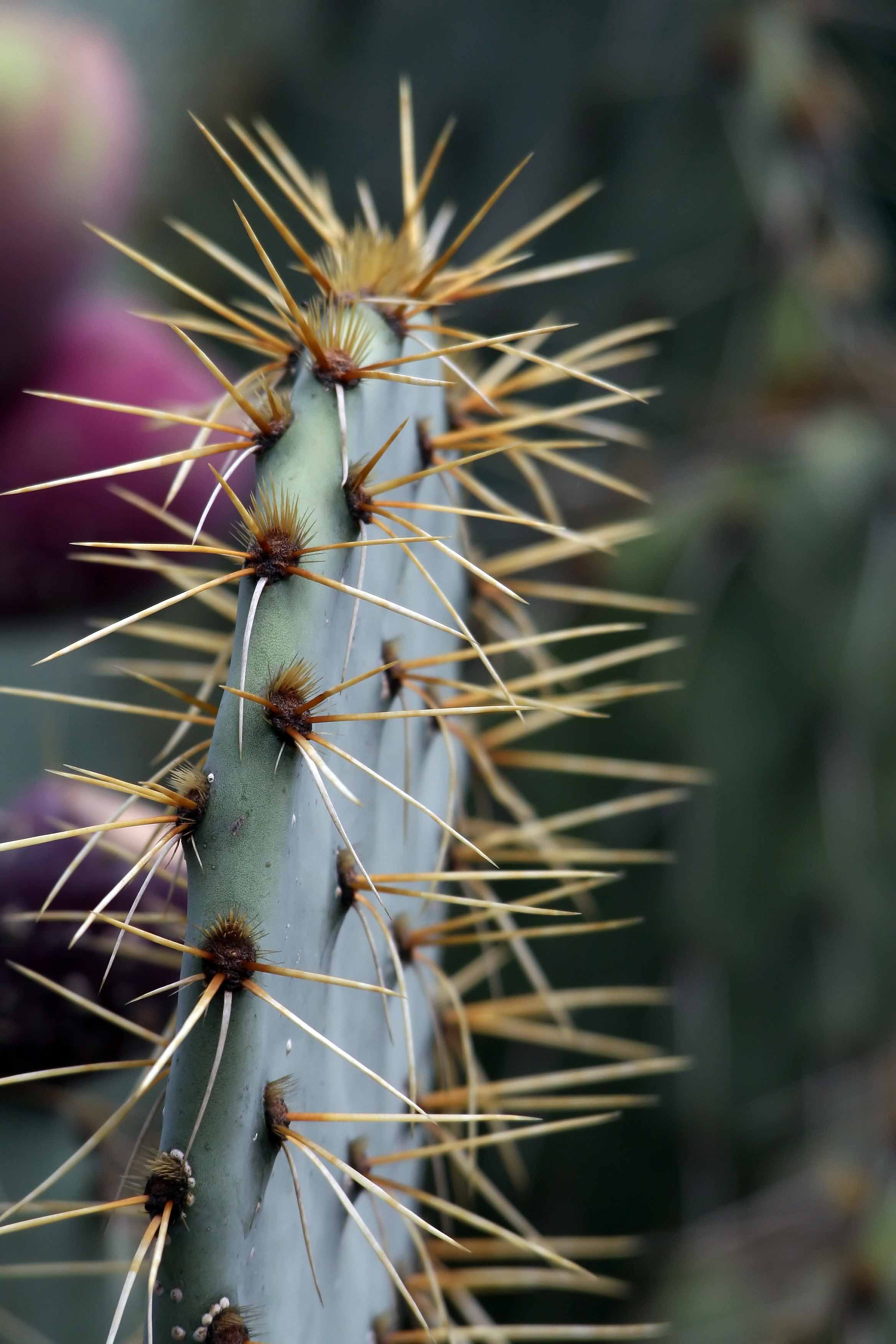
O. e. var. flavispina

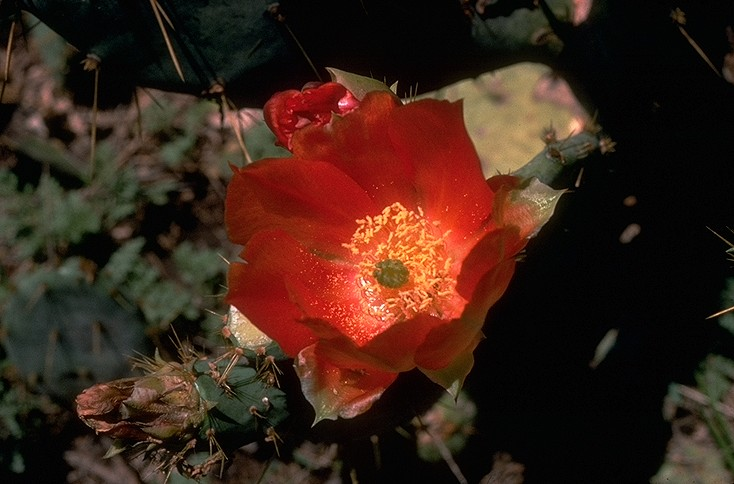
An unusual orange-red form of O. e. var. lindheimeri

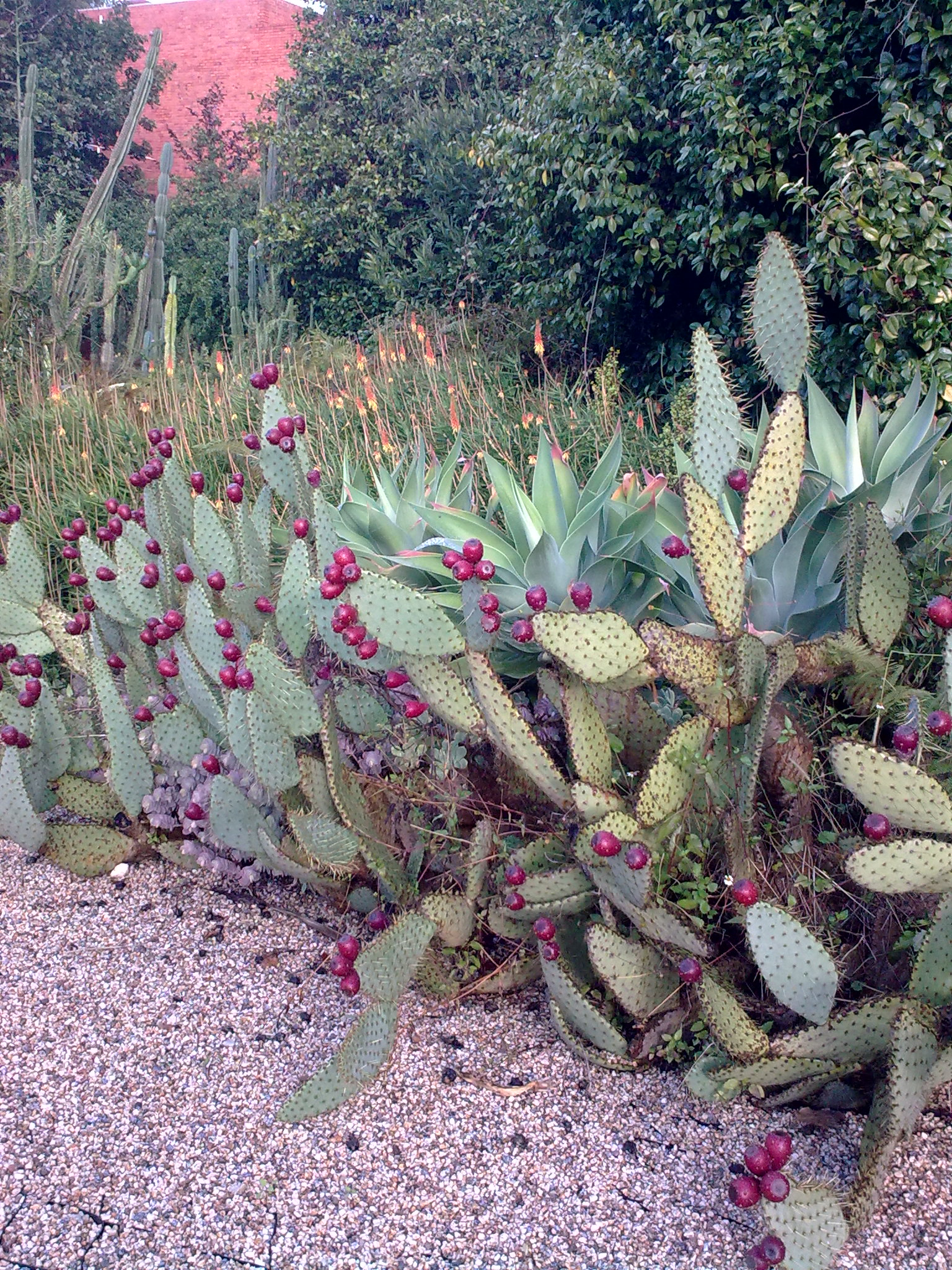
O. e. var. linguiformis

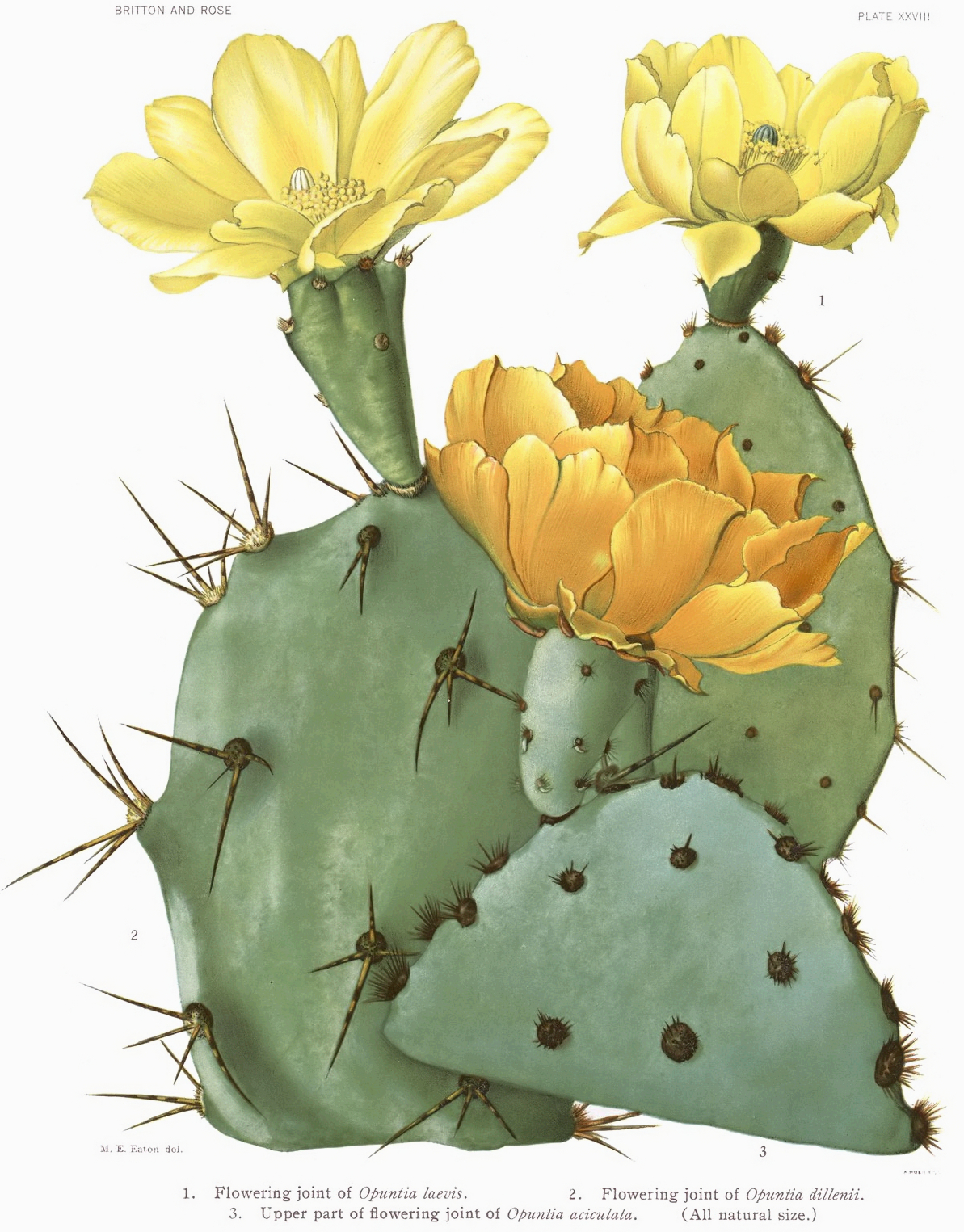
O. e. var. laevis (right)

== Distribution ==
O. engelmannii is native to sub-tropical regions of North America. It prefers hot, dry conditions, but is more frost-tolerant than other species of Opuntia. O. engelmannii range extends from California to Louisiana in the United States, and from Sonora (state) and Chihuahua (state), to the Tamaulipan matorral in north and central Tamaulipas.

Although found occasionally in the Mojave Desert, it tends to be replaced by Opuntia basilaris, which does not need the summer rain.

Naturalised in southern and eastern Africa, including Loisaba in Kenya, where they are considered invasive. O. engelmannii was also reported in Spain in the early 2000s and remains invasive.

== Description ==
O. engelmannii is generally shrubby, with dense clumps up to 3.5 metres (11 ft) high, usually with no apparent trunk. The pads, or cladodes, are green (rarely blue-green), obovate to round, about 15–30 cm long and 12–20 cm wide. In the Sonoran Desert, terminal pads face predominantly east-west, so as to maximize the absorption of solar radiation during summer rains. The cladodes make up the stem and are the primary photosynthetic structure. O. engelmannii typically grows in high altitude desert, where lower atmospheric pressure increases water stress and may make gas exchange difficult, leading to a reliance on CAM photosynthesis for more efficient gas exchange and less water lost in the process.

The glochids are initially yellow and brown with age. Cactus spines are nonvascularized, modified leaves that arise from areoles and are usually in clumps. Spines are extremely variable, with anywhere from 1-8 per areole, and are often absent from lower areoles; they are yellow to white, slightly flattened, and 1–6 cm long. Spines harden from the top down and develop a waxy cuticle. The spines do not photosynthesize. The spines primarily serve as defense. However, the spines can also facilitate asexual reproduction: by latching onto animal fur; in the process of disentangling the animal may carry off a cladode which might later dislodge and grow a new plant.

The Opuntia genus has both tap roots and adventitious roots with some taproots acting as water storage. Deeper roots act as an anchor and absorb water from deeper stores. Shallow roots spread over a large area to absorb rainfall quickly. Opuntia species are notable for the development of both types of roots from cladode areoles. This is especially useful for propagation, wherein separated cladodes are capable of developing roots and new shoots from the areoles, to produce a new functional plant separate from the original.

Opuntia species tend to be colonized by arbuscular mycorrhizal fungi. Mycorrhizae colonize Opuntia plants more in the summer months than in the winter months and when there is plenty of water around. Mycorrhizae help to alleviate drought stress in Opuntia plants.

The flowers are yellow, occasionally reddish, and 6-9 cm in diameter and length. The flowers are hermaphroditic with inferior ovaries. Their stamens are thigmotropically sensitive. Flowering is in April and May, with blooms lasting 1-2 days each. Single-day blooms open around 11AM and remain open for 6 hours. Blooms lasting 2 days tend to open around 10AM and remain open until 4:30PM on day one. On the second day they open from 8:30AM to 2:00PM. This results in an average total bloom time of 12 hours. Flowers produce nectar as a pollinator attractant, and O. engelmannii is noted to produce more nectar than other members of Opuntia.

Members of the Opuntia genus undergo cross pollination, but also tend to be self-compatible. Cross-breeding between species in the Opuntia genus has also been observed. Pollinators include solitary bees and sap beetles. Most pollinators of O. engelmannii are polylectic (pollinate unrelated species), but several known pollinators have specialized for Opuntia, including members of the families Anthophorini (previously known as Anthophoridae), Andrenidae, and Megachilidae, primarily consisting of solitary bees. Large and medium bees are considered the most beneficial for inter-plant pollination. Beetles and smaller bees typically fall into the category of "pollen thieves," as they often take pollen without effectively pollinating the plant.

The purple fleshy fruits are 3.5 to 9 cm long, and 2-4 cm wide. They are spineless and glabrous, and are often ovate-elongate or barrel-shaped. The fruits are sweet and consumed by several animals, including humans.

Opuntia seeds are ovoid or lens shaped, averaging 0.45 cm long, 0.35 cm wide, and 0.16 cm thick. The seed funiculus is thick and white, and embryos tend to be curved. O. engelmannii fruits typically have an average of 144 - 172 seeds. The seeds can remain viable in the soil for at least 19 months prior to germination. In its North American range, O. engelmannii seeds are often distributed by coyotes.

== Uses ==
The fruits were a reliable summer food for Native American tribes. The Tohono O'odham of the Sonoran Desert in particular classified the fruits by color, time of ripening, and how well they kept in storage.

O. engelmannii is cultivated as an ornamental plant, for use in drought tolerant gardens, container plantings, and natural landscaping projects.

O. engelmannii has also been used as a living hedge and cattle fodder. These functions, paired with a capacity to survive drought, led to its import to various locations in Africa.
