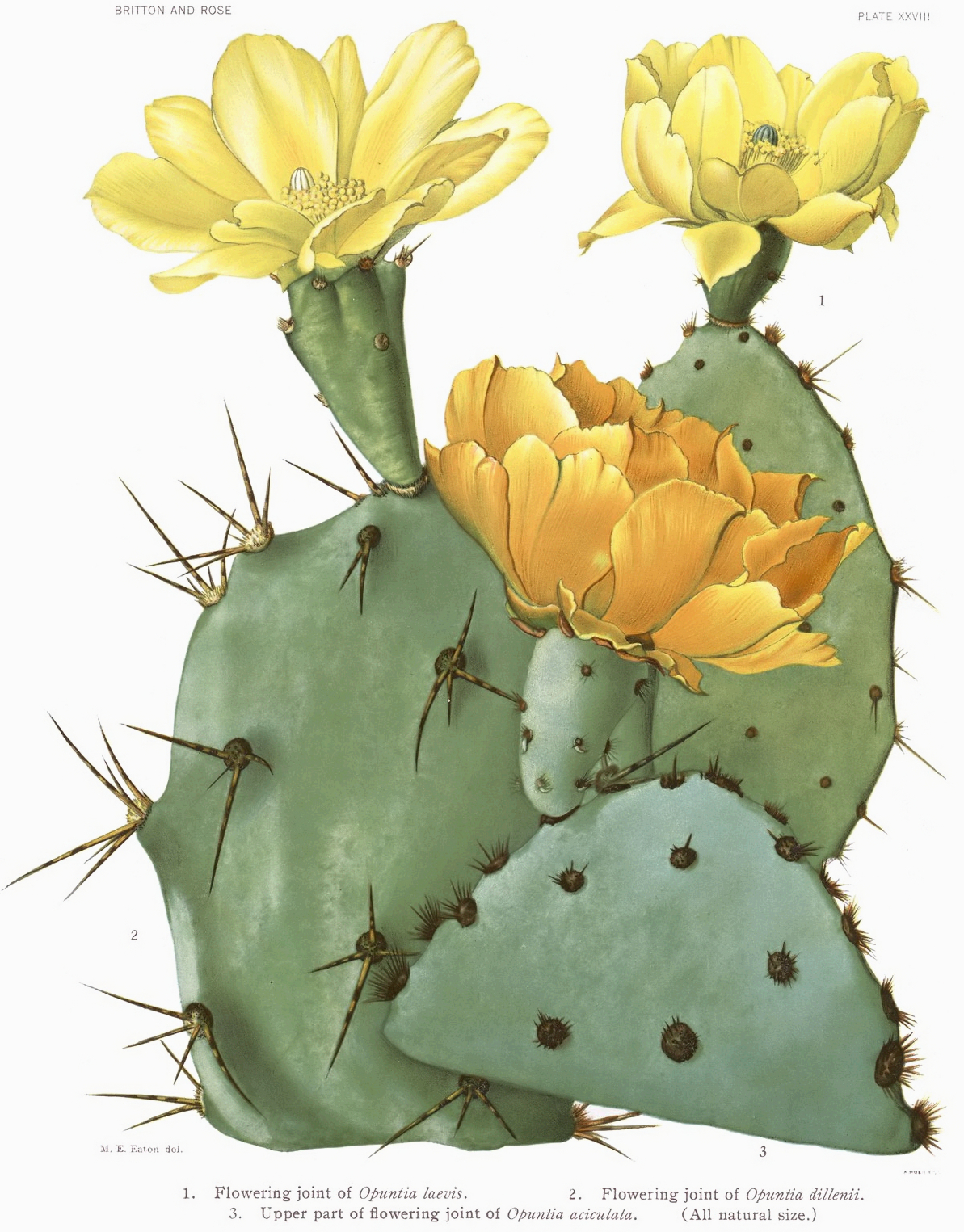
- Middle image is Opuntia aciculata

Conservation status
- Data Deficient (IUCN 3.1)

Scientific classification
- Kingdom: Plantae
- Clade: Tracheophytes
- Clade: Angiosperms
- Clade: Eudicots
- Order: Caryophyllales
- Family: Cactaceae
- Genus: Opuntia
- Species: O. aciculata

Binomial name
- Opuntia aciculata Griffiths

= Opuntia aciculata =

Species of cactus

Opuntia aciculata, also called Chenille pricklypear, old man's whiskers, and cowboy's red whiskers, is a perennial dicot and an attractive ornamental cactus native to Texas. It belongs to the genus Opuntia (prickly pear cacti). It is also widespread in Nuevo Leon and Tamaulipas (northern Mexico).

It was reported from Nuevo León, Mexico, according to D. Weniger in 1970. The specific name aciculata derives from many sources: the Latin word acicula which means "a small pin for a headdress". Chenille prickly pear, one of its vernacular names, comes for the fringe of spines around the edge of the pad. The specific name also means "covered with small pins".

== Description ==
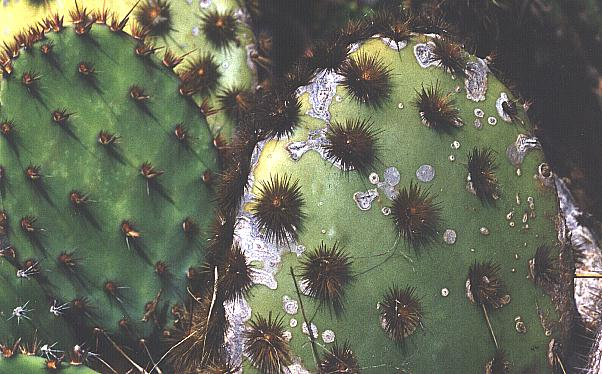
An illustration of the species

It has numerous glochids or microspines, 3–12 mm long, acicular, slender, spreading, forming a dense cluster. They are normally golden yellow to dark red in color. It has often no spines, or rarely one to three, which are reflexed. They are of a yellowish or toasted colour with a brownish base, up to 3 cm in length. They are often folded and seemingly deciduous.

It has broad, point-tipped blossoms colored golden yellow, orange, or red and of diameter 8–10 cm. Several sources report the flowers as being yellow in color, but the plants in cultivation usually have bright red-orange flowers, and sometimes the centre is greenish. Petals are broad-rounded or retuse, filaments are yellowish and the stigma dull yellowish with eight to 10 green lobes. They mostly flower in early summer or spring. The plant's fruits are usually pear-shaped, covered with fine spines and glochids, and are purple or green.

== Distribution and habitat ==
It is native to Chihuahuan Desert (Texas) and northern Mexico.

== Ecology ==
Like its other cactus relatives, this deciduous and succulent species also has its leaves reduced to spines to reduce excess transpiration, which helps it to survive by conserving water in the hot climate of Texas, in southwestern United States, and North Mexico. This adaptation also helps in defending itself from being consumed by any herbivores there. It has the special ability to propagate from woody or softwood stem cuttings. It can even propagate by cuttings of leaf pads at any time in the growing season, allowing the cut surface to callus over before planting. This cactus can survive healthily and produce good many flowers only if it is fully exposed to the sun. They can also tolerate temperatures from −5 to −12 °C.

== Uses ==
The fruits are edible and the soft pads (nopales) can be cooked as vegetables. After burning of spines, the pads can serve as a good feed for cattle.
