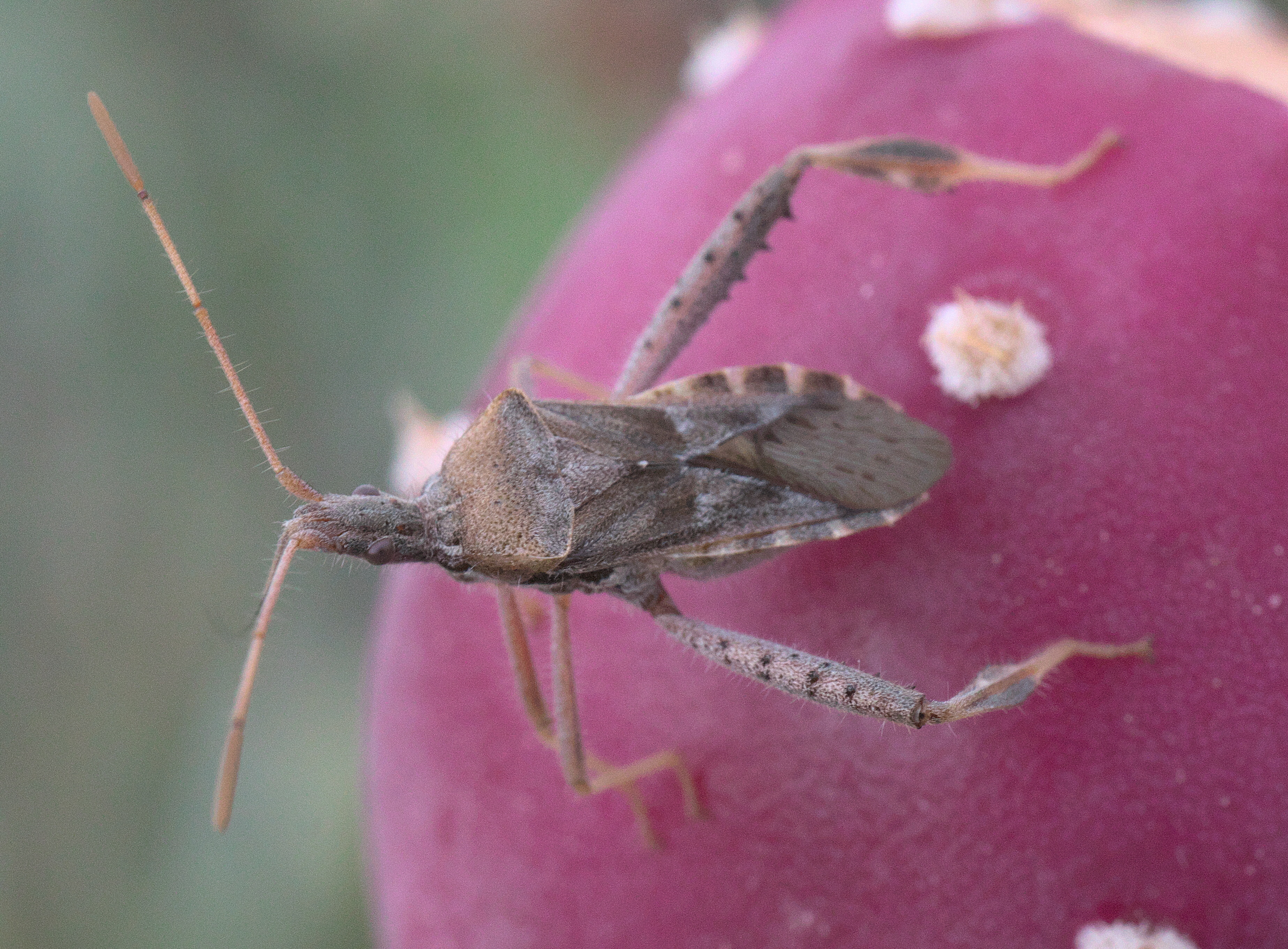
- Narnia femorata

Scientific classification
- Kingdom: Animalia
- Phylum: Arthropoda
- Clade: Pancrustacea
- Class: Insecta
- Order: Hemiptera
- Suborder: Heteroptera
- Family: Coreidae
- Tribe: Anisoscelini
- Genus: Narnia; Stål, 1862

= Narnia (bug) =

Genus of true bugs

Narnia is a genus of leaf-footed bugs in the family Coreidae. There are six described species in Narnia, found in the southwestern United States, Florida, and Mexico.

== Species ==
These six species belong to the genus Narnia:

- Narnia coachellea Bliven, 1956
- Narnia femorata Stål, 1862 (Leaf-footed cactus bug)
- Narnia inornata Distant, 1892
- Narnia marquezi Brailovsky, 1975
- Narnia snowi Van Duzee, 1906
- Narnia wilsoni Van Duzee, 1906

== Gallery ==
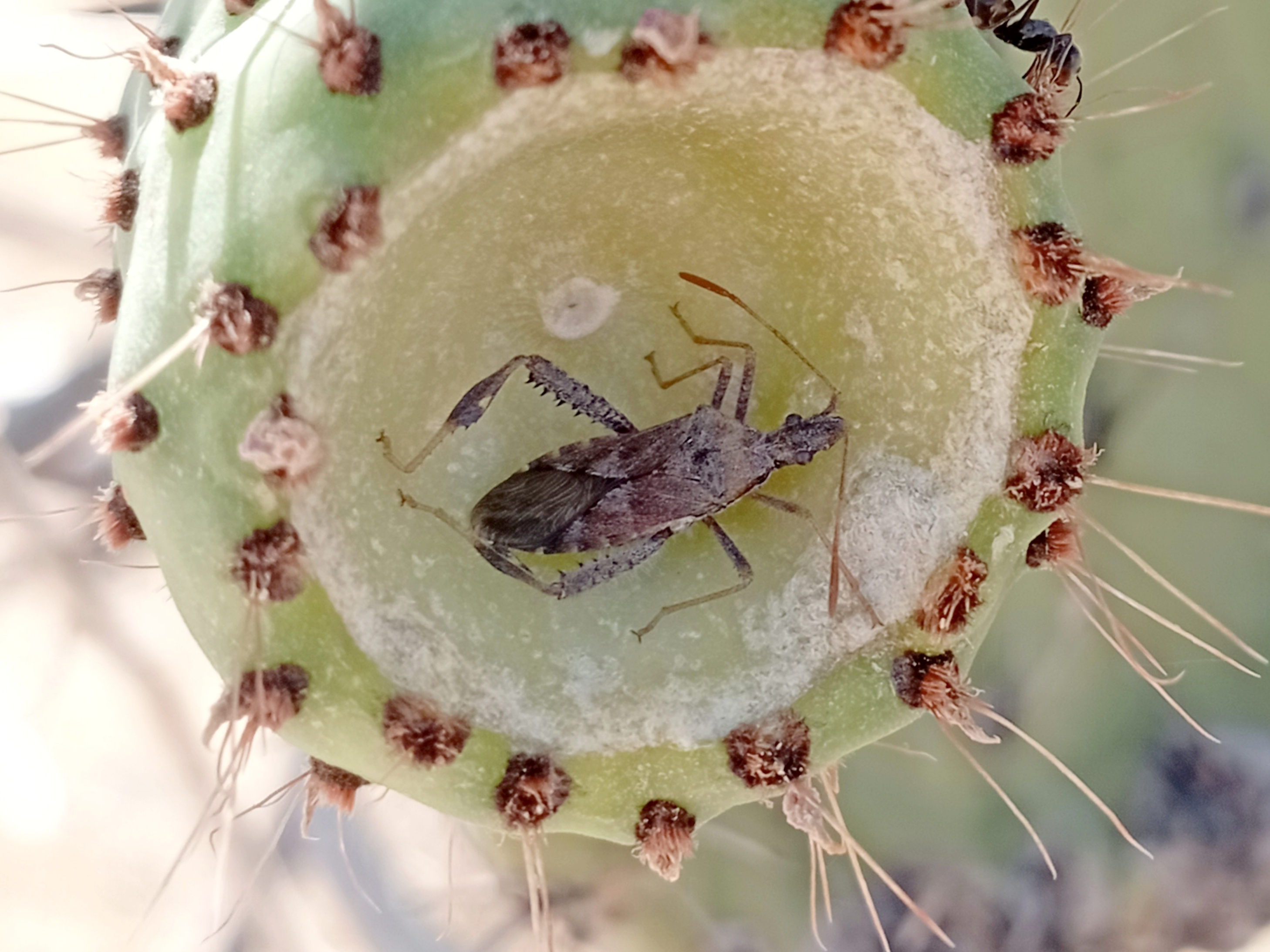
Narnia femorata

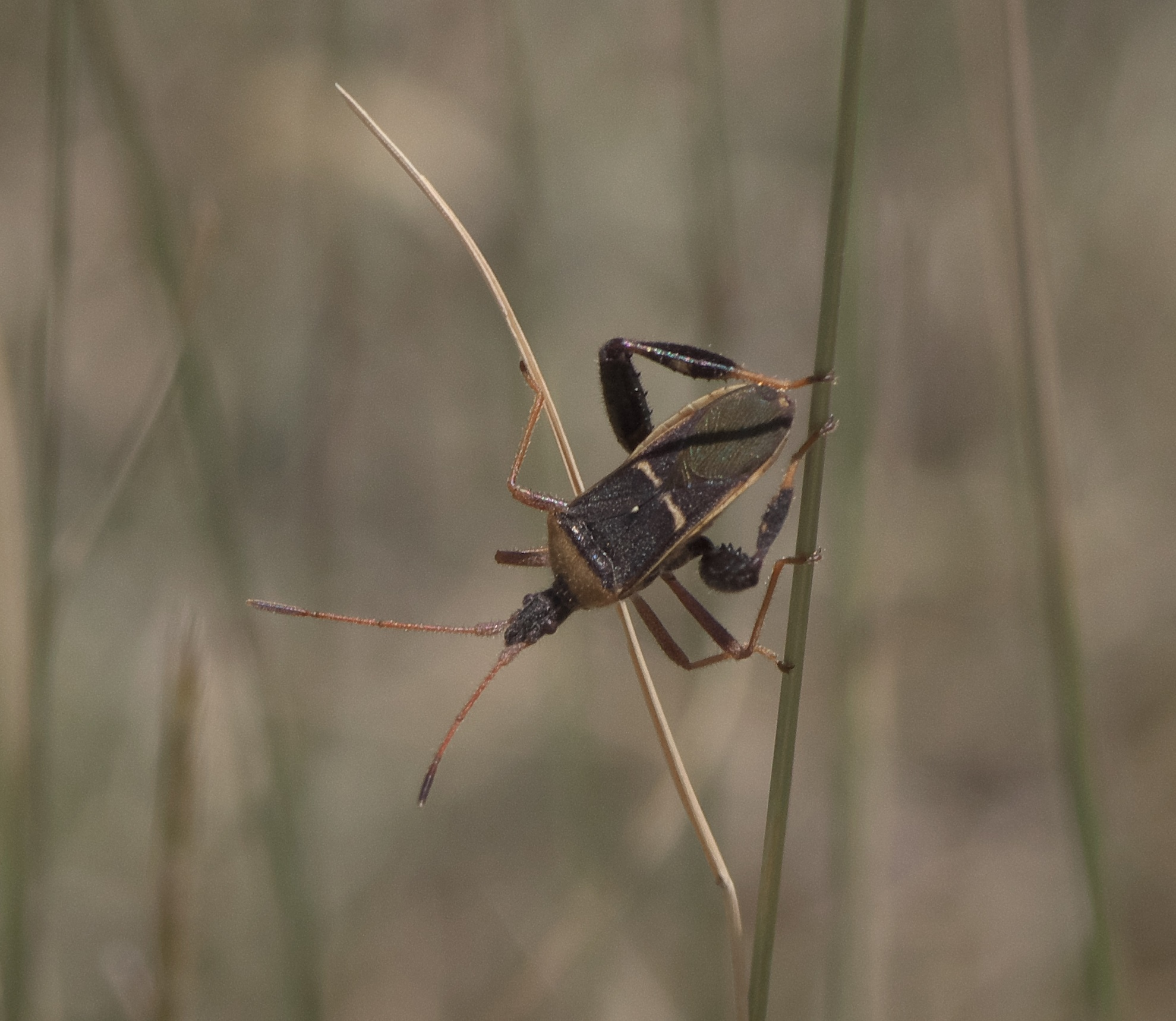
Narnia snowi

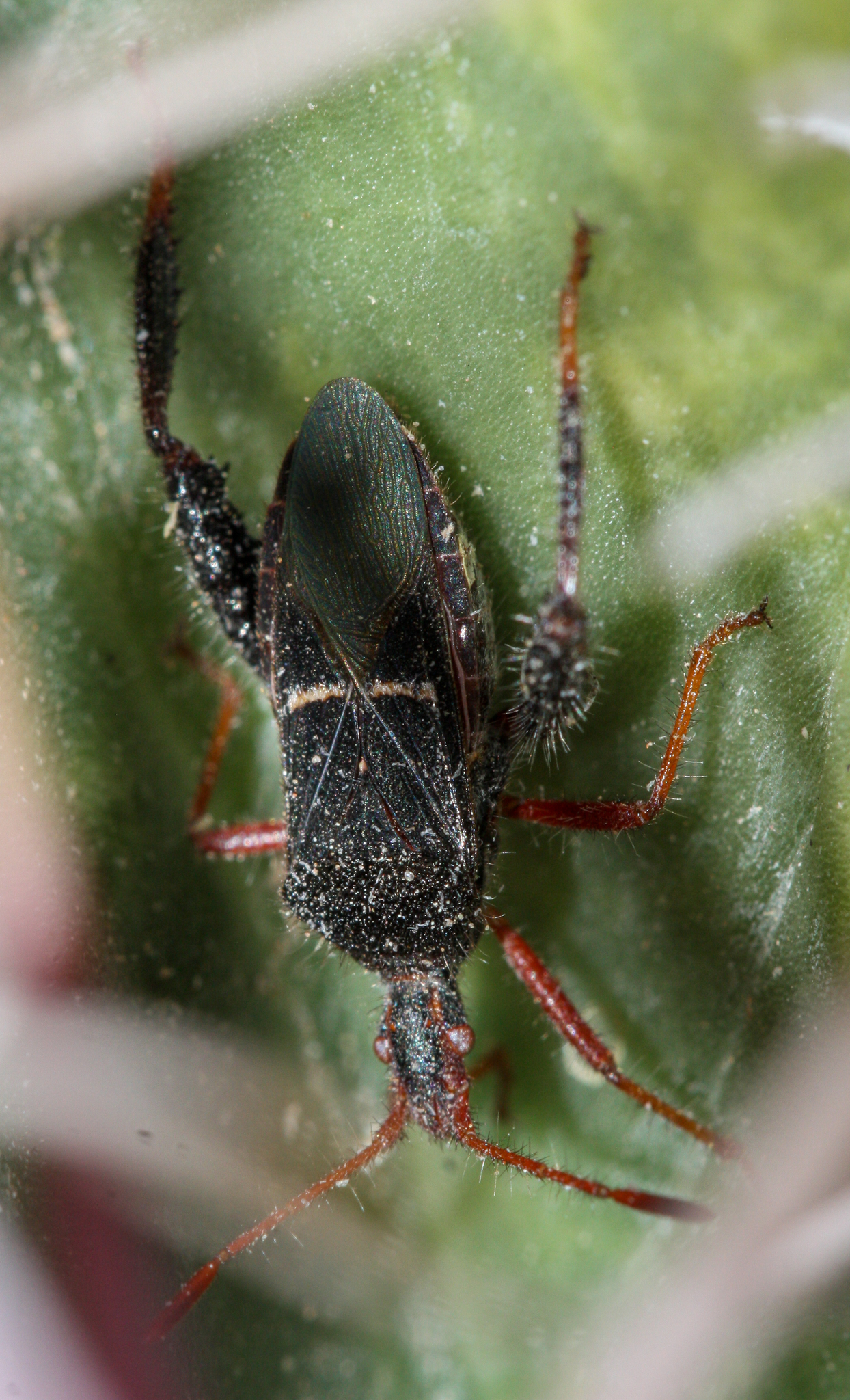
Narnia wilsoni
