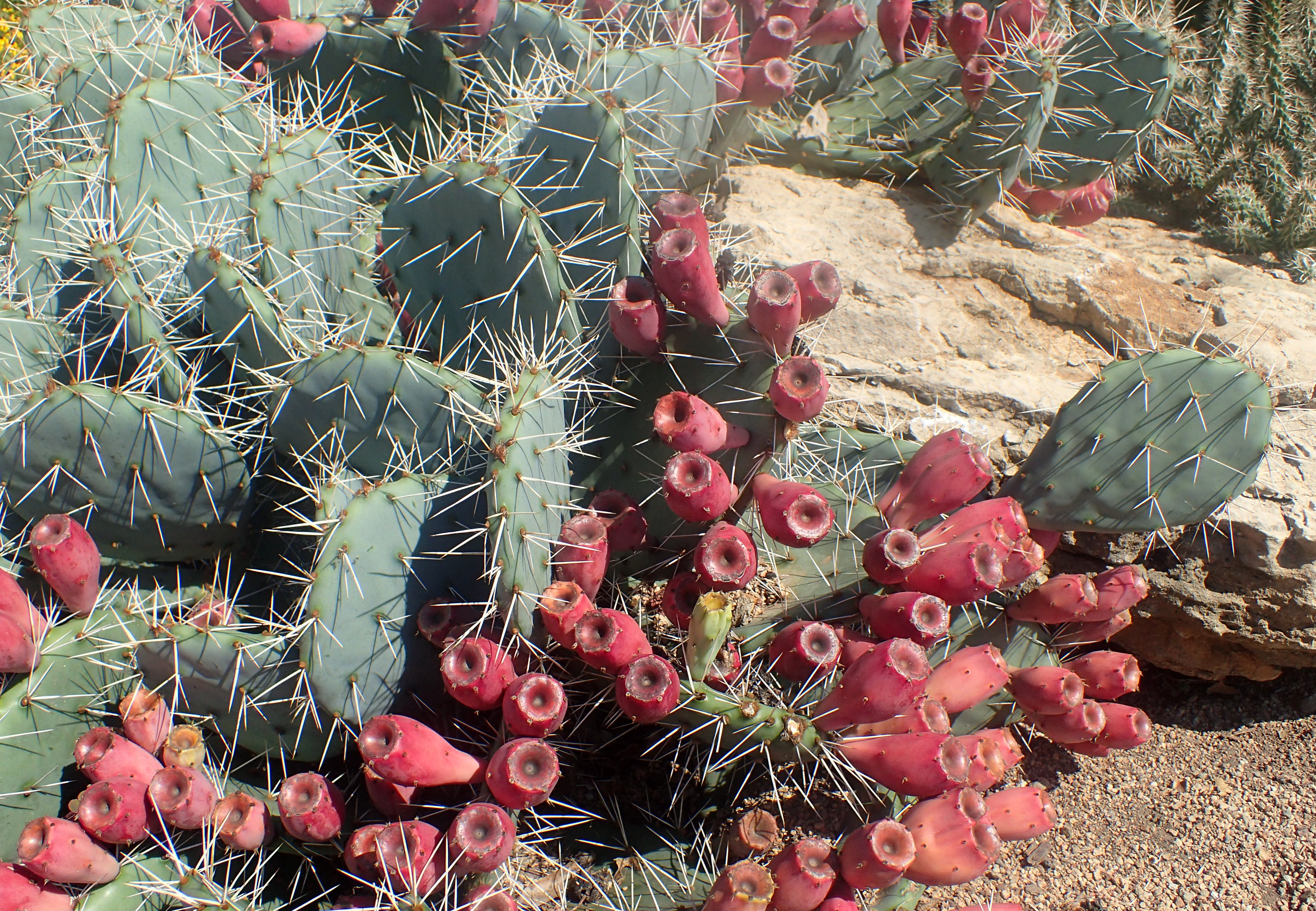

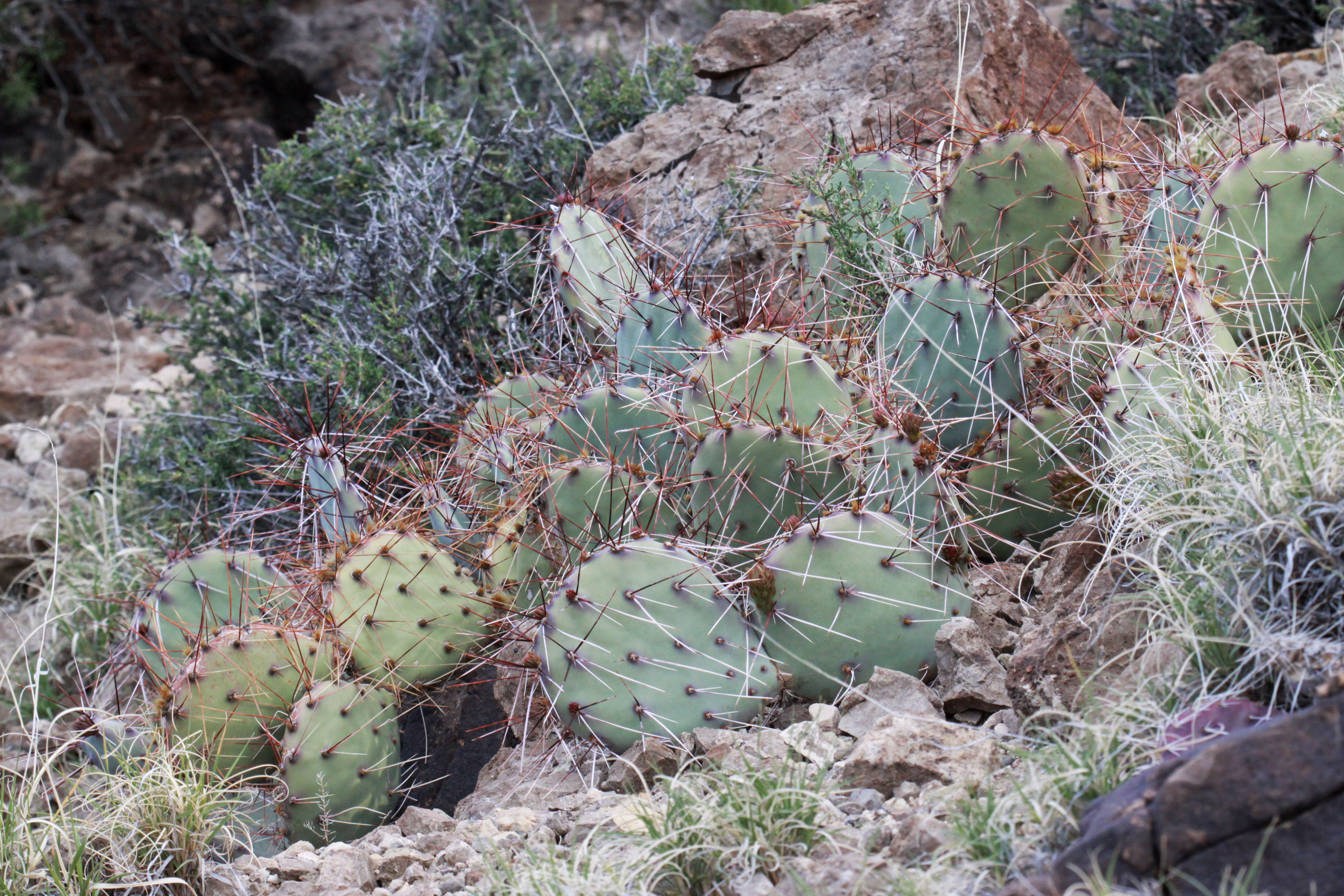

Conservation status
- Least Concern (IUCN 3.1)

- Secure (NatureServe)

Scientific classification
- Kingdom: Plantae
- Clade: Tracheophytes
- Clade: Angiosperms
- Clade: Eudicots
- Order: Caryophyllales
- Family: Cactaceae
- Genus: Opuntia
- Species: O. phaeacantha

Binomial name
- Opuntia phaeacantha Engelm.

Synonyms
- List: Opuntia angustata Engelm. & J.M.Bigelow; Opuntia blakeana Rose; Opuntia canada Griffiths; Opuntia chihuahuensis Rose; Opuntia comanchica Urlandt; Opuntia confusa Griffiths; Opuntia cyclodes (Engelm. & J.M.Bigelow) Rose; Opuntia engelmannii var. cyclodes Engelm. & J.M.Bigelow; Opuntia engelmannii var. wootonii (Griffiths) Fosberg; Opuntia eocarpa Griffiths; Opuntia gilvescens Griffiths; Opuntia gregoriana Griffiths; Opuntia laevis var. canada (Griffiths) Peebles; Opuntia mesacantha var. sphaerocarpa J.M.Coult. ex Wooton & Standl.; Opuntia mojavensis Engelm. & J.M.Bigelow; Opuntia platyacantha f. mojavensis (Engelm. & J.M.Bigelow) Schelle; Opuntia recurvospina Griffiths; Opuntia rubrifolia Engelm. ex J.M.Coult.; Opuntia superbospina Griffiths; Opuntia toumeyi Rose; Opuntia woodsii Backeb.; Opuntia wootonii Griffiths; Opuntia zuniensis Griffiths

= Opuntia phaeacantha =

Species of cactus

Opuntia phaeacantha is a species of prickly pear cactus known by the common names brown-spine prickly pear, tulip prickly pear, and desert prickly pear, which is found across the southwestern United States, lower Great Plains, and northern Mexico. The plant forms dense but localized thickets. Several varieties of this particular species occur, and it may hybridize with other prickly pears, making identification sometimes tricky.

== Description ==
Opuntia phaeacantha has a mounding habit of flattened green pads. The pads are protected by clusters of spines. Each cluster bearing 1-4 spines. The spines are brown, reddish-brown, yellowish, or gray, usually darker brownish toward the base than the tip, and often over 3 cm in length. At the base of the spine cluster is a round tuft of easily detached yellowish to reddish or brown bristles called glochids. Glochids are also present on the fruit. This is the source for the plants common name "prickly pear".

The flowers are bright yellow with a pale green to orange or red center. In some regions occasional plants may produce flowers of other colors such as orange, pink, or magenta. The edible fruits are usually red or purple with a pink seedy flesh. The fruit has a mild watermelon or pear flavor. Both the fruit and the fleshy pads provide an important food resource for desert wildlife.

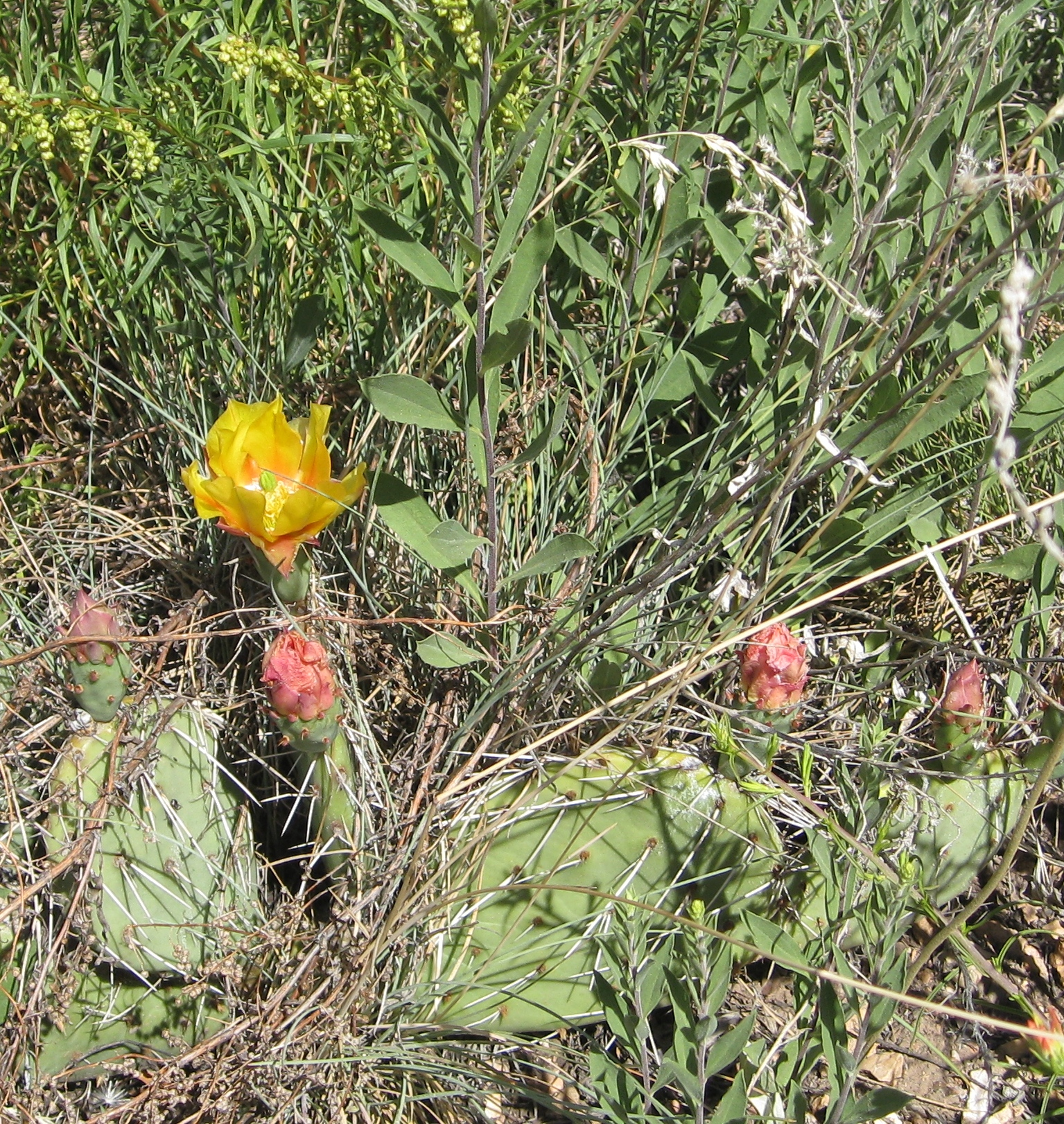
Typical yellow flower ►

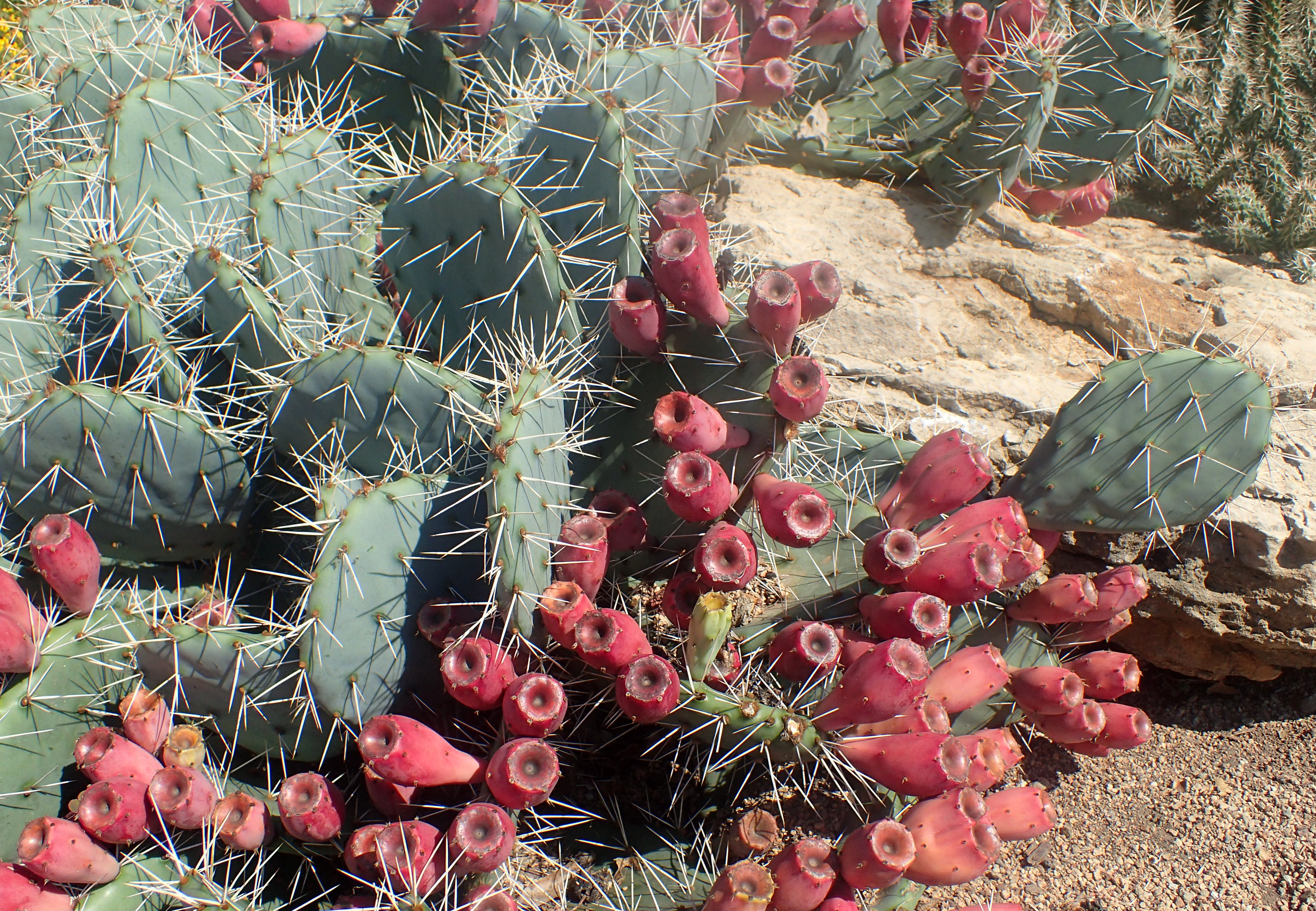
Plant with light spine color and fruit

This plant, like other Opuntia species, is attacked by cactus moth.

Other common names for this species, and ones which are now considered variants of this species, include plateau prickly-pear, New Mexico prickly-pear, and Kingman prickly-pear.

The species is widespread, from California south to Mexico and the Southwest United States. There are multiple variations and perhaps these will be described as varieties or full species in the future.

== Uses ==
The cactus can be prepared as food in a similar fashion to Opuntia humifusa.
