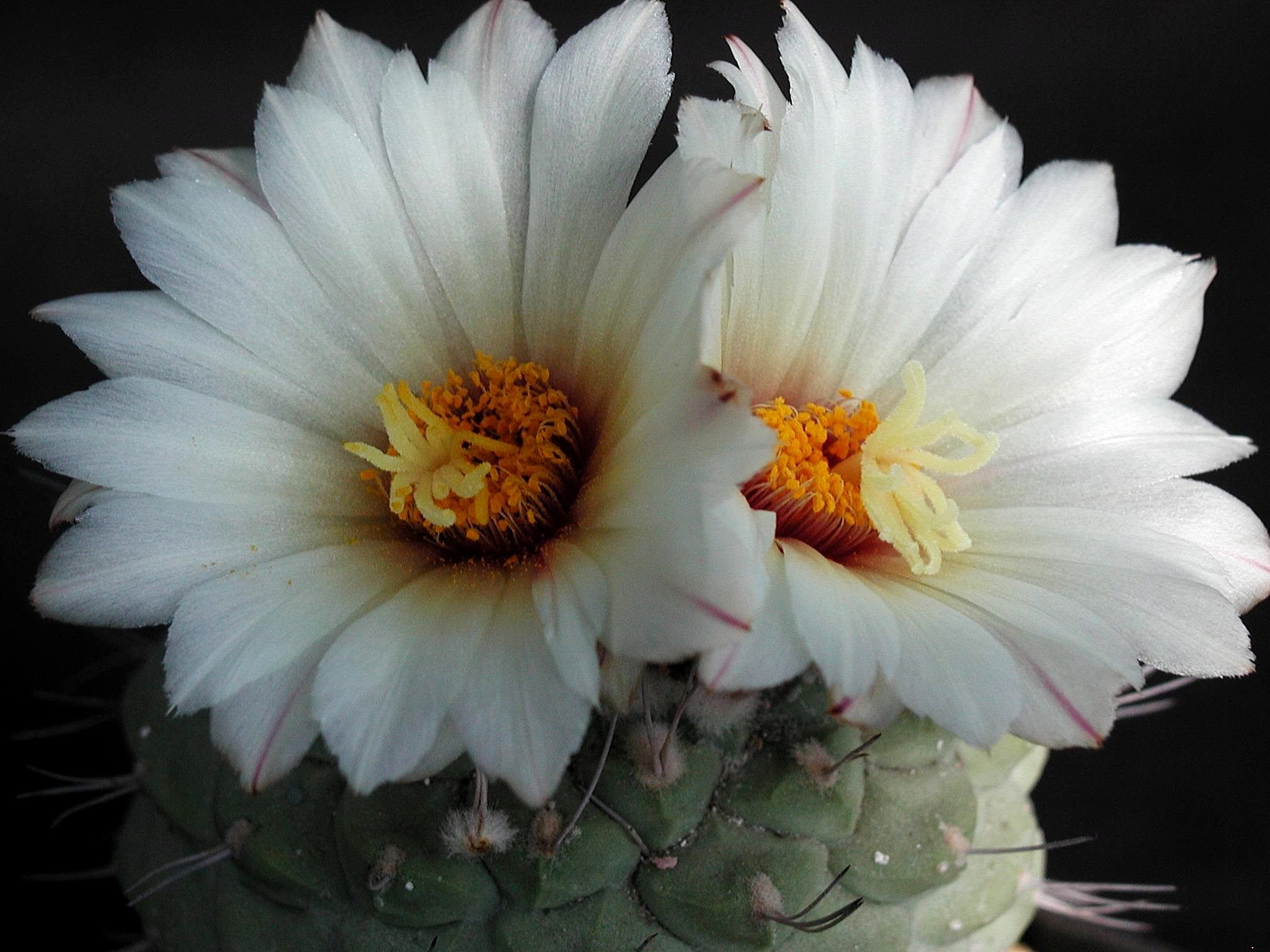
- Strombocactus disciformis subsp. disciformis

Conservation status
- Vulnerable (IUCN 3.1)
- CITES Appendix I (CITES)

Scientific classification
- Kingdom: Plantae
- Clade: Tracheophytes
- Clade: Angiosperms
- Clade: Eudicots
- Order: Caryophyllales
- Family: Cactaceae
- Subfamily: Cactoideae
- Tribe: Cacteae
- Genus: Strombocactus; Britton & Rose
- Species: S. disciformis

Binomial name
- Strombocactus disciformis (DC.) Britton & Rose

Synonyms
- Ariocarpus disciformis (DC.) Marshall; Ariocarpus disciformis ssp. jarmilae (Halda) Halda; Cactus disciformis Kuntze; Echinocactus disciformis (DC.) K.Schum. Echinocactus turbiniformis Pfeiff. Mammillaria disciformis DC. Pediocactus jarmilae ? Strombocactus disciformis ssp. jarmilae (Halda) Halda; Strombocactus jarmilae Halda

= Strombocactus =

Genus of cacti

Strombocactus disciformis is a rare species of cacti and the only species of the genus Strombocactus. The plant originates from Central and Northeast Mexico.

== Description ==
Strombocactus is a monotypic genus with a strong turnip-like root, a small, depressed, roughly spherical stem covered with spirally arranged overlapping tubercles, each with a spine-bearing areole at its tip.

Strombocactus disciformis are low-growing, gray-green succulents with a broadly round, unbranched stem and root. In their natural habitats, they grow in a disk shape, half hidden in the ground, reaching around 8 cm in diameter and 2-3 cm in height. In cultivation, they become nearly spherical. Adult tubers can reach 15 cm in diameter, larger than the above-ground parts. The plant's spiral ribs are deeply notched, creating a wart-like appearance with a ratio close to the golden ratio (13:8). Areoles are located on the blunt ends of these warts, which are curved (straighter in cultivation) and have a square base. They rarely have more than four or five short, bristly thorns, which fall off after a few years.

Flowers come from new growth at the crown, emerging from the youngest areoles. The flowers are white to cream or magenta and 2.5- to 3.5-cm long and open to about 4 cm in diameter. The 7-mm-long, thin-walled brown fruits contain 0.3-mm reddish-brown seeds.

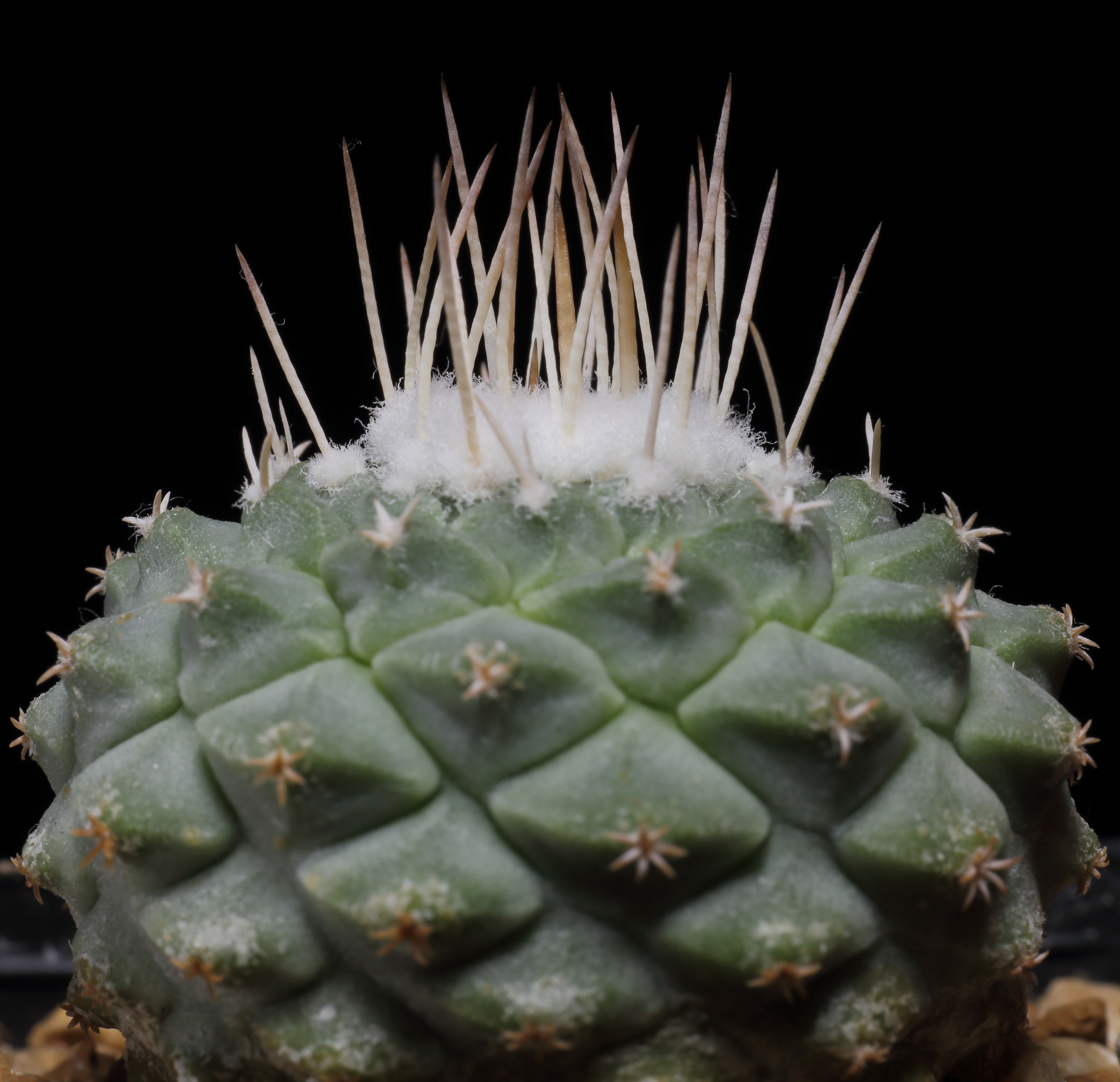
Growth habit

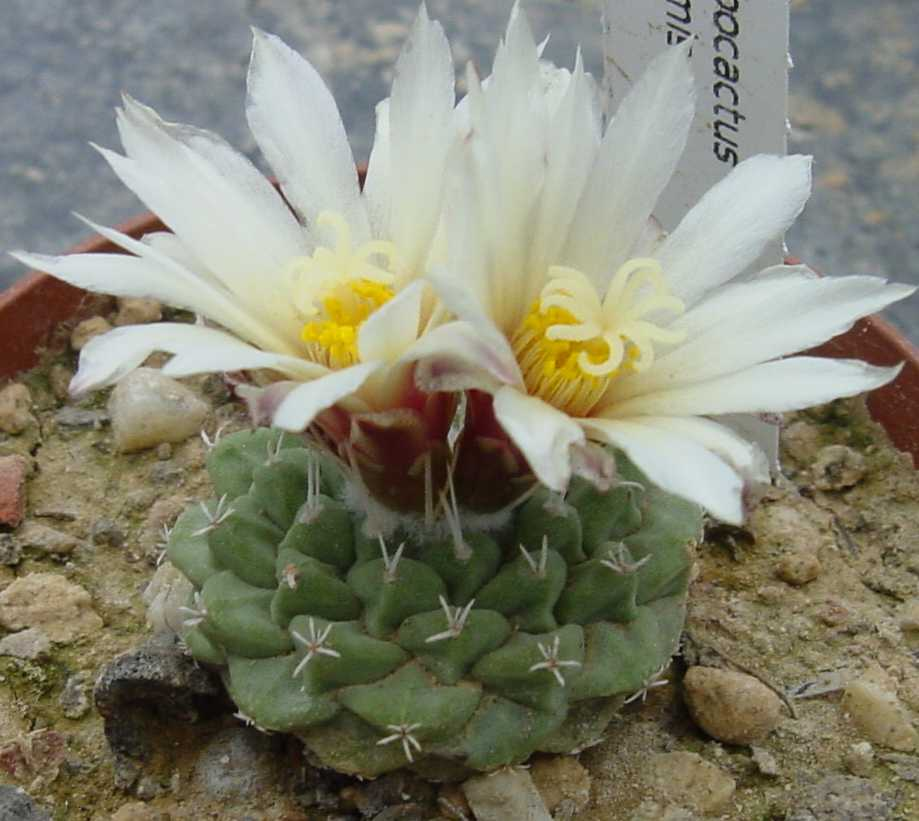
Flowers

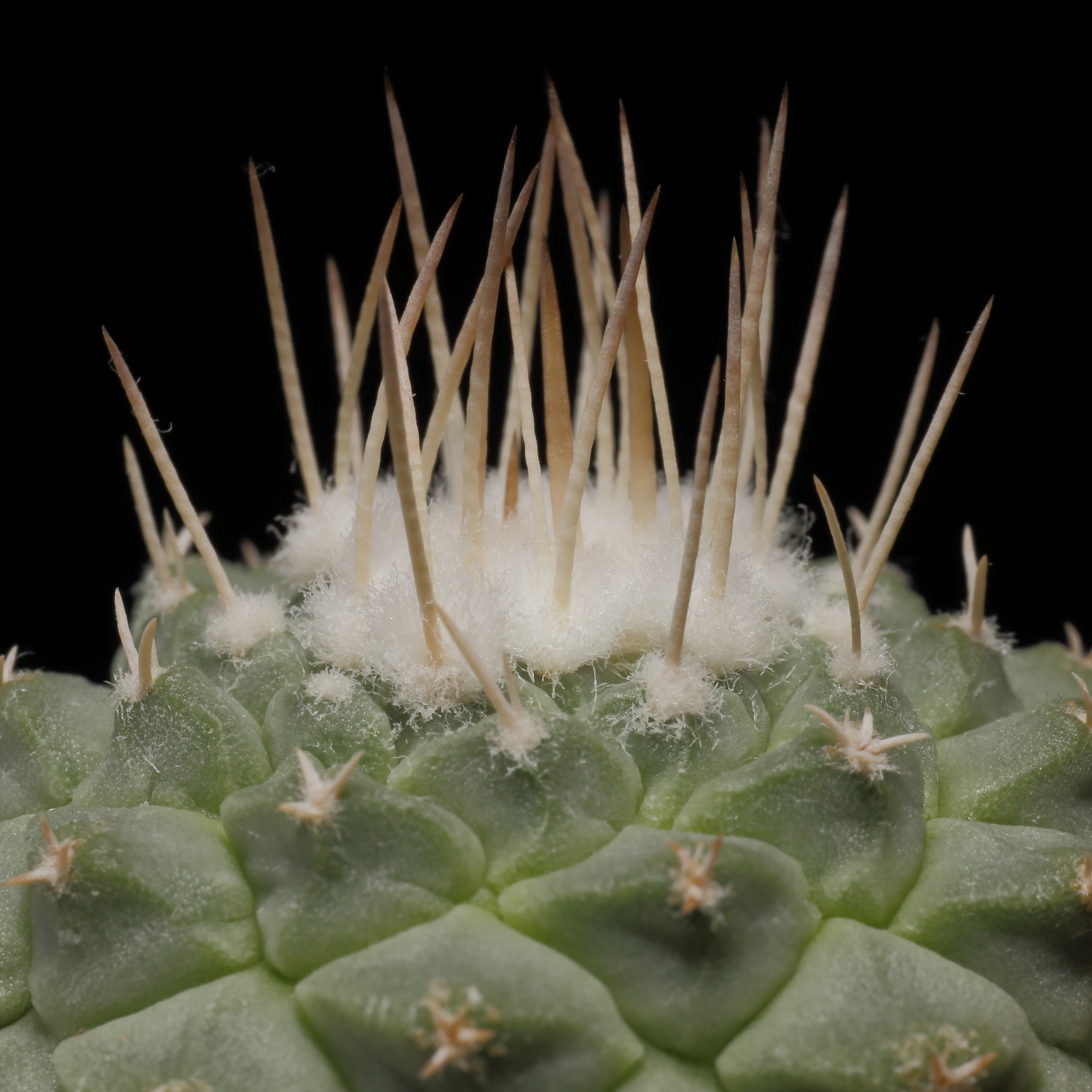
Spines

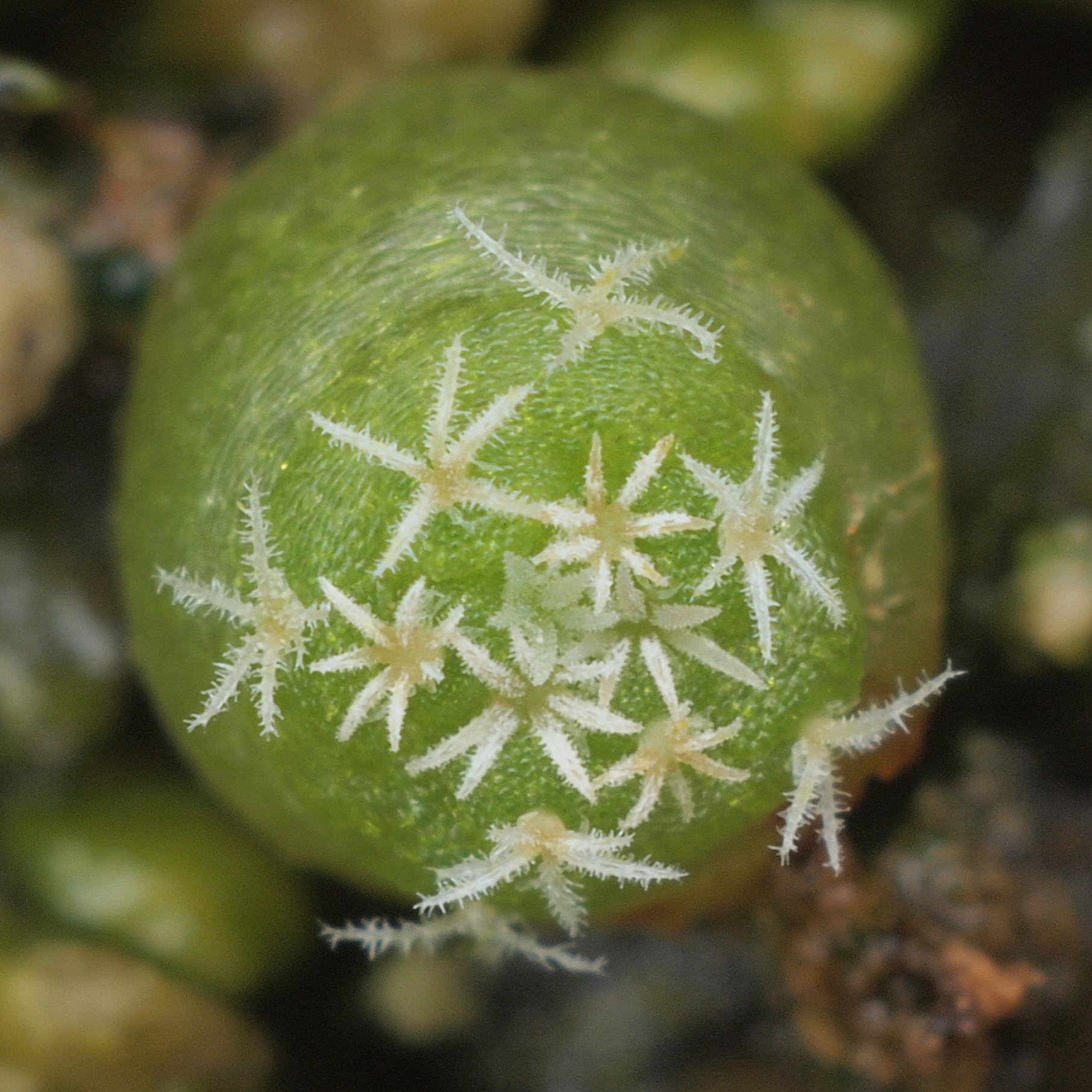
Seedling

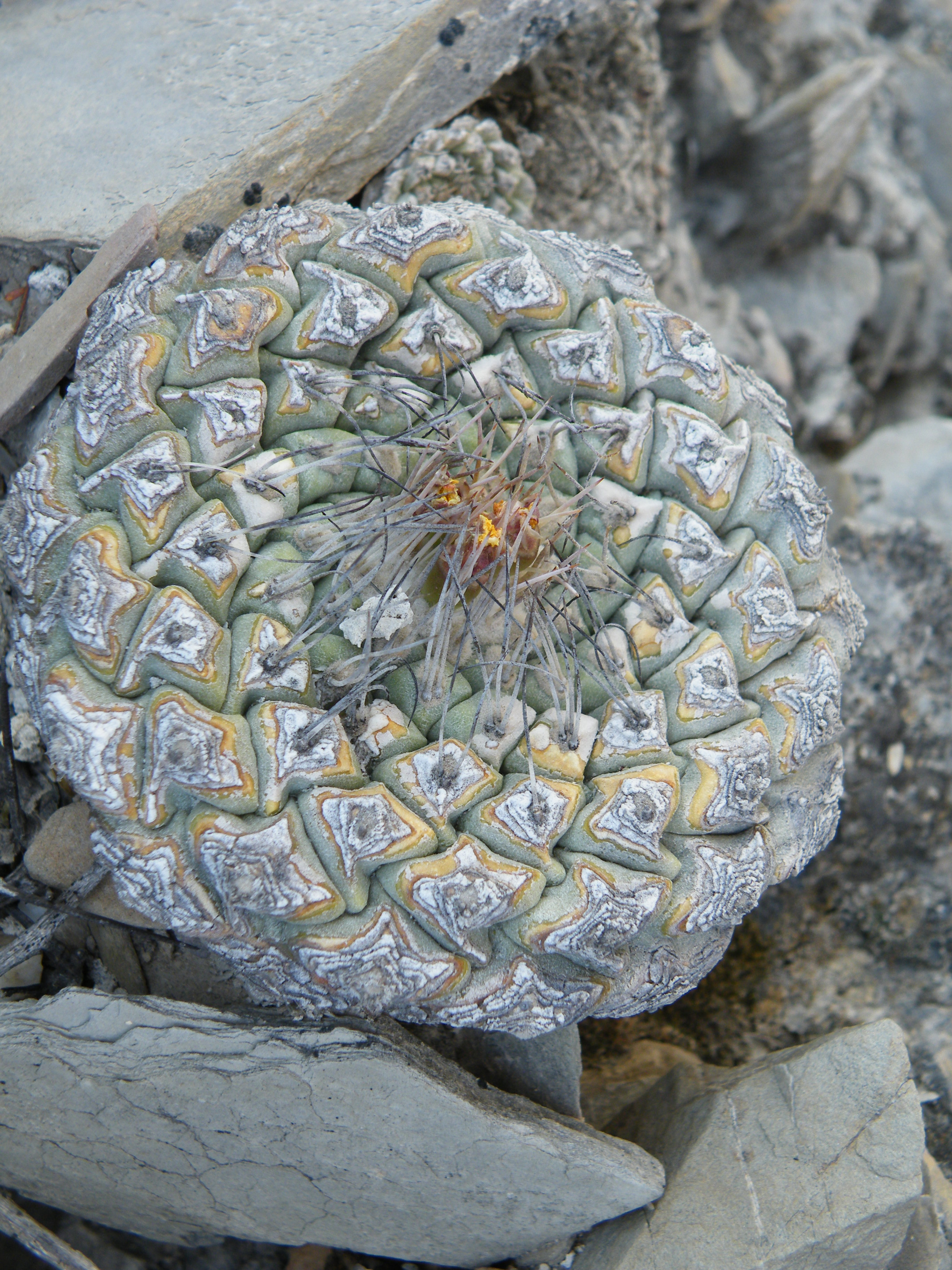
View of plant from the top

== Subspecies ==
The species has two recognized subspecies:

Image	Subspecies	Distribution
	Strombocactus disciformis subsp. disciformis	Querétaro to Hidalgo
	Strombocactus disciformis subsp. esperanzae Glass & S.Arias	Guanajuato

== Distribution ==
Strombocactus disciformis is found in the Mexican states of Querétaro, Hidalgo, and Guanajuato, growing on almost vertical, weathered limestone rocks at altitudes of 1000 to 1600 meters.

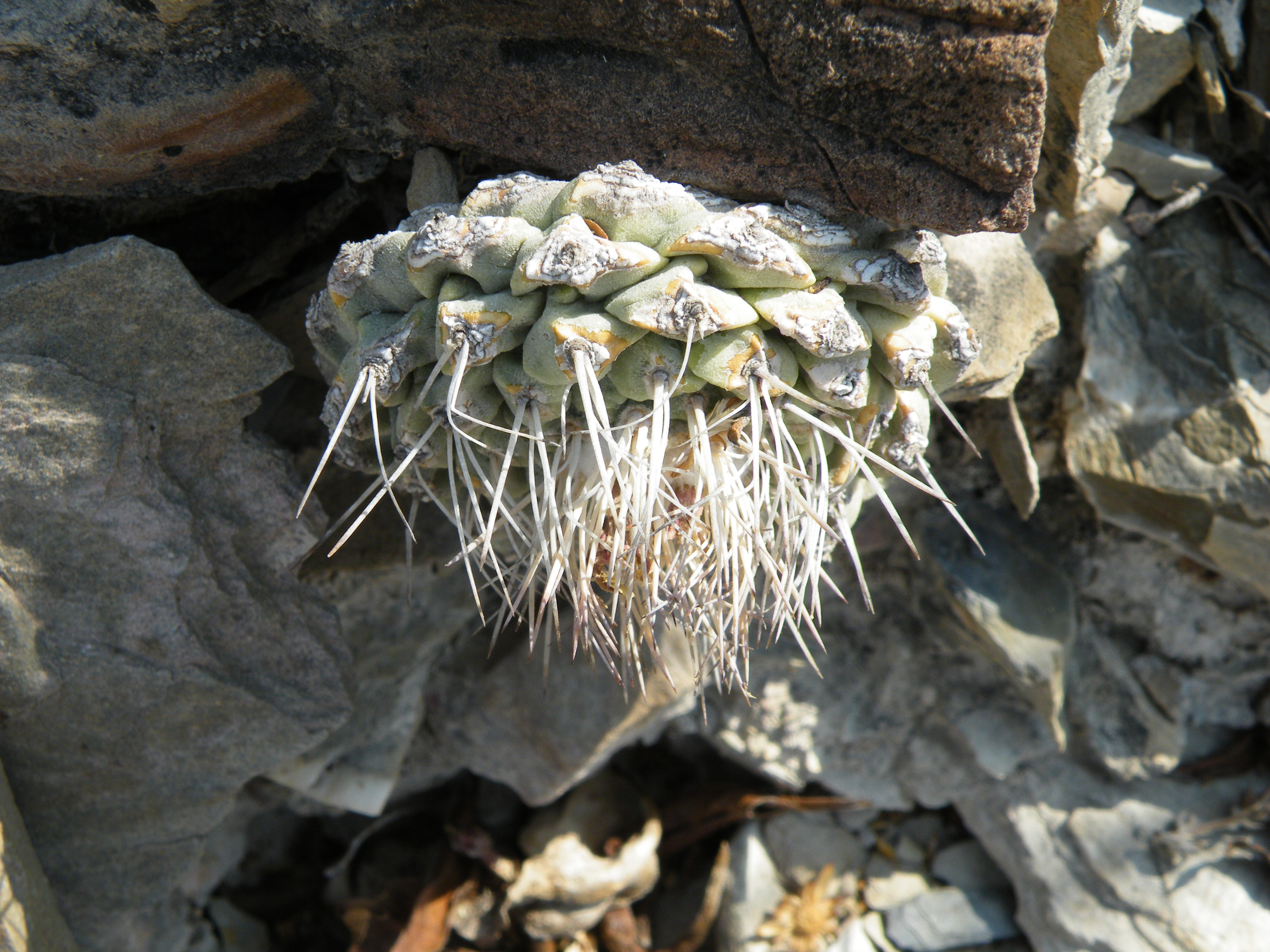
Plant growing vertically in habitat in Pena Blanca, Queretaro

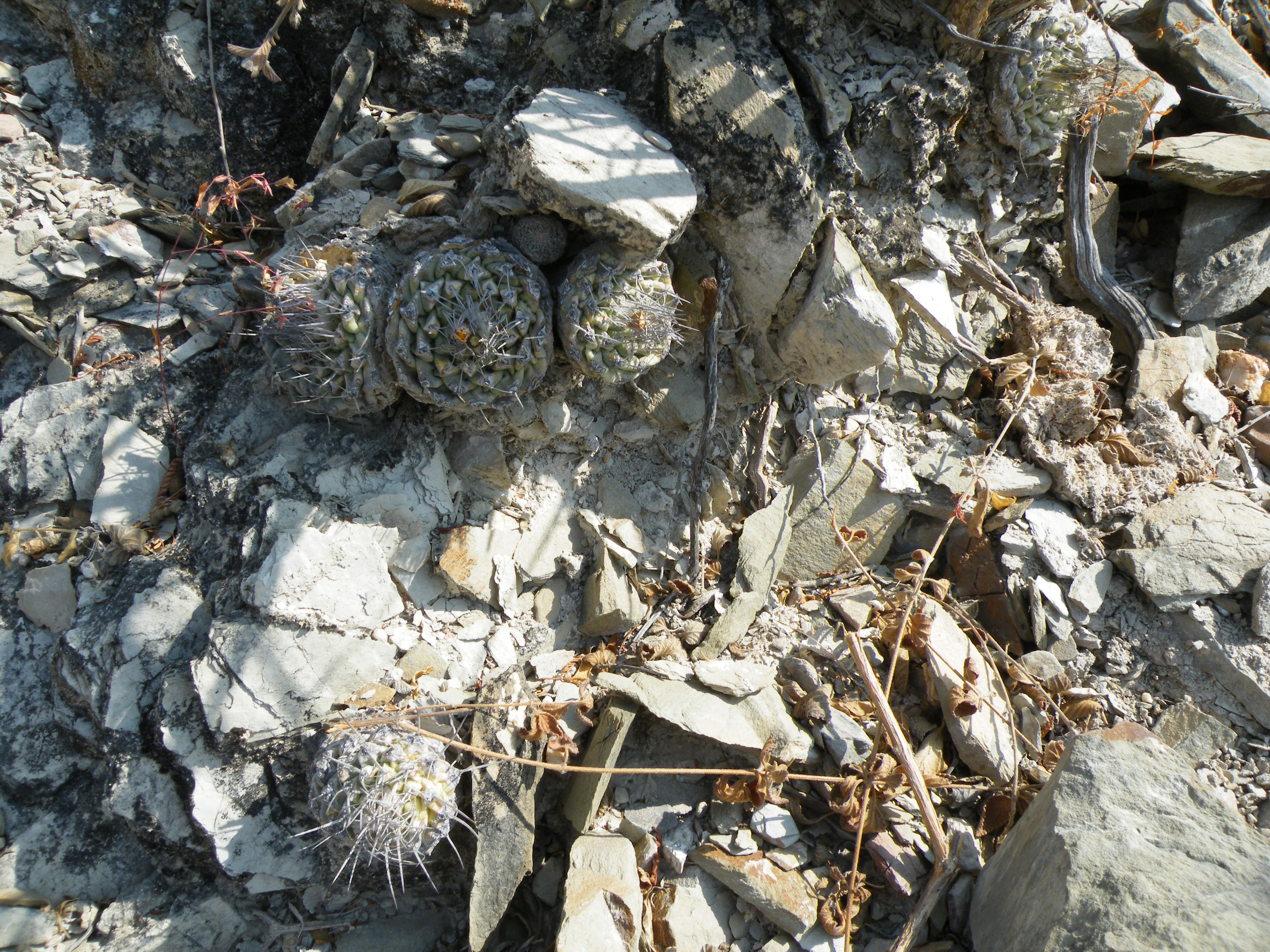
Plants growing on rocks in Pena Blanca, Queretaro

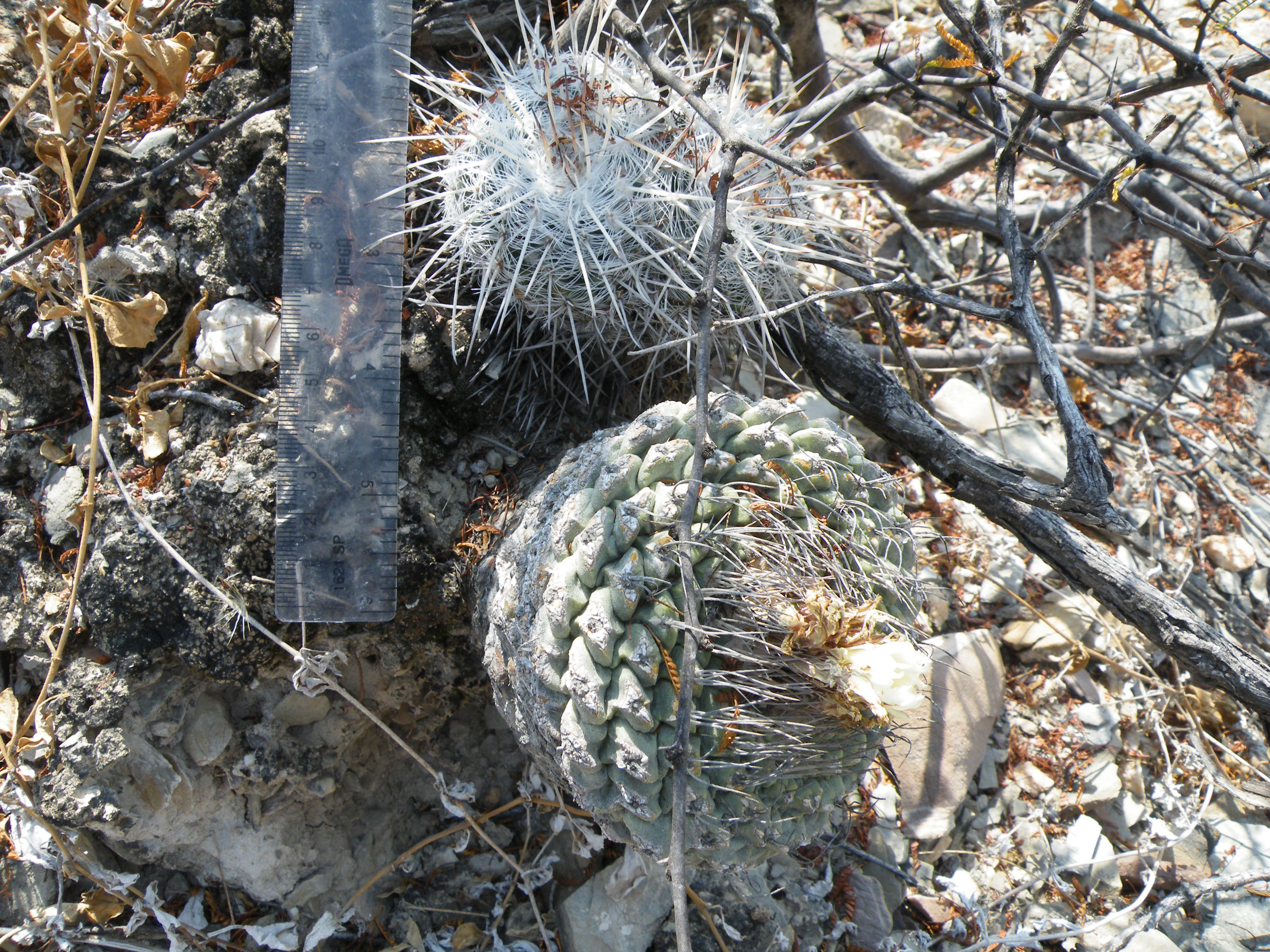
Plant growing with Mammillaria parkinsonii

== Taxonomy ==
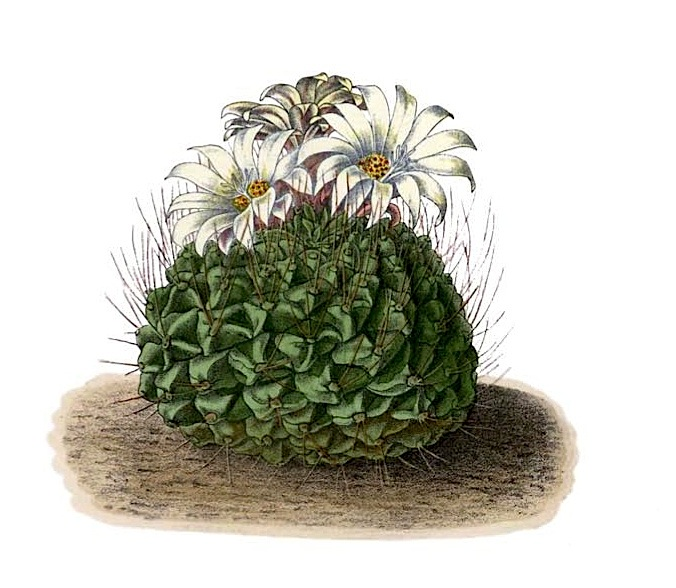
Plate of Strombocactus disciformis from Blühende Kakteen - Iconographia Cactacearum Tafel 39a 1904

First described as Mammillaria disciformis by Augustin-Pyrame de Candolle in 1828, the specific epithet disciformis is derived from the Latin "discus" (disc) and "-formis" (shaped), referring to the plant's shape. Nathaniel Lord Britton and Joseph Nelson Rose reclassified it as Strombocactus in 1922.

== Conservation status ==
Both subspecies are classified as Vulnerable on the IUCN Red List, which states that it has a limited range and "is experiencing a decline in mature individuals due to illegal overcollection". The species is listed in Appendix 1 of the Convention on International Trade in Endangered Species meaning commercial international trade is prohibited and non-commercial international trade is regulated.
