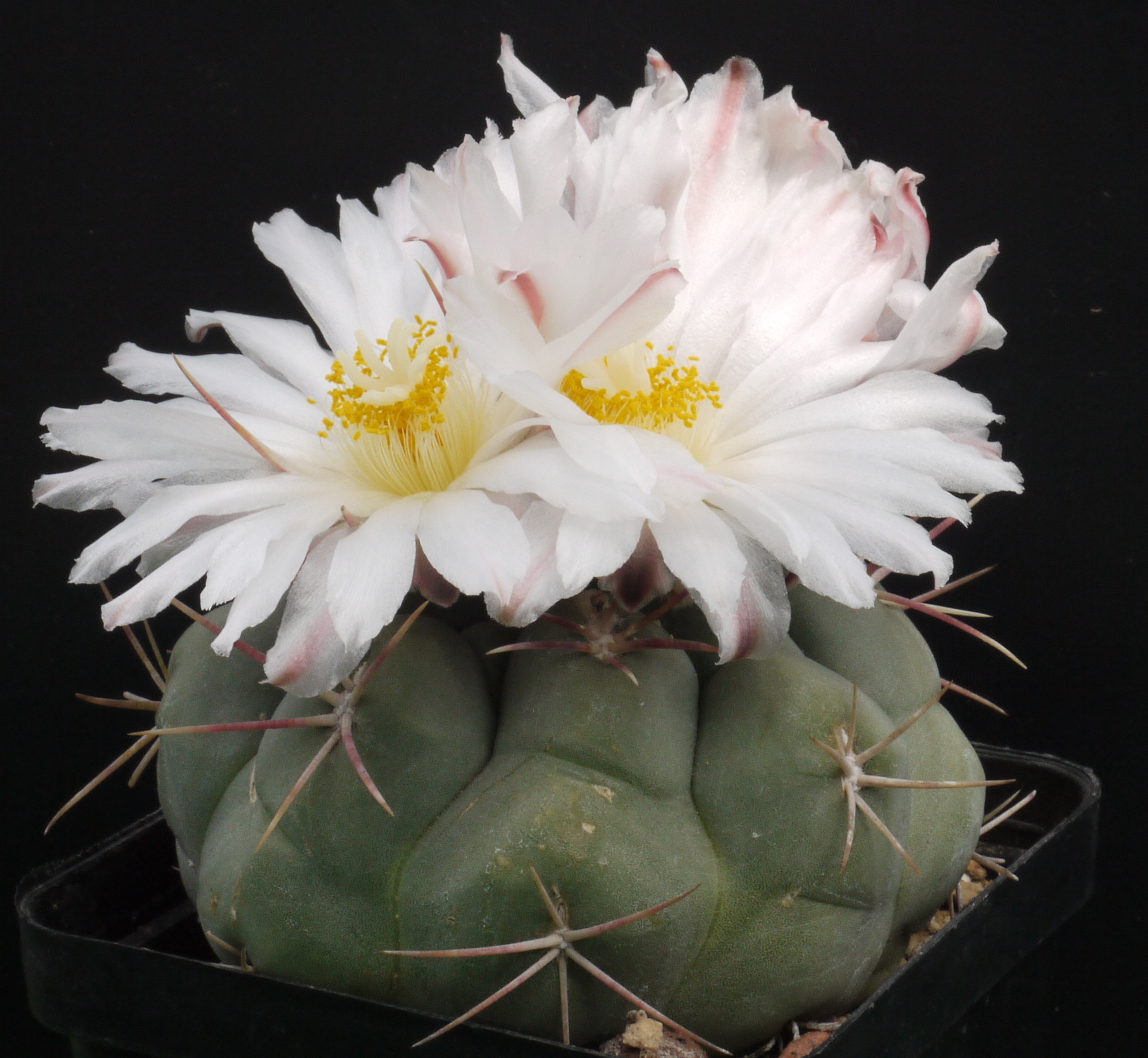

Conservation status
- Least Concern (IUCN 3.1)

Scientific classification
- Kingdom: Plantae
- Clade: Tracheophytes
- Clade: Angiosperms
- Clade: Eudicots
- Order: Caryophyllales
- Family: Cactaceae
- Subfamily: Cactoideae
- Genus: Thelocactus
- Species: T. hexaedrophorus

Binomial name
- Thelocactus hexaedrophorus (Lem.) Britton & Rose 1922

Synonyms
- List: Echinocactus hexaedrophorus Lem. 1839; Echinofossulocactus hexaedrophorus (Lem.) Lawr. 1841; Thelocactus hexaedrophorus var. decipiens (Lem.) Pilbeam 1996; Echinocactus droegeanus Hildm. ex K.Schum. 1898; Echinocactus fossulatus Scheidw. 1841; Echinocactus fossulatus var. quadrispinus Regel 1858; Echinocactus hexaedrophorus var. decipiens A.Berger 1929; Echinocactus hexaedrophorus var. droegeanus Schelle 1907; Echinocactus hexaedrophorus var. fossulatus (Scheidw.) Salm-Dyck 1853; Echinocactus hexaedrophorus f. fossulatus (Scheidw.) Voss 1894; Echinocactus hexaedrophorus f. labouretianus (K.Schum.) Schelle 1907; Echinocactus hexaedrophorus var. labouretianus K.Schum. 1898; Echinocactus hexaedrophorus var. major Quehl 1894; Echinocactus hexaedrophorus f. major (Quehl) Schelle 1907; Echinocactus hexaedrophorus var. subcostatus Salm-Dyck 1850; Echinocactus insculptus Scheidw. 1837; Thelocactus fossulatus (Scheidw.) Britton & Rose 1923; Thelocactus hexaedrophorus var. droegeanus (Schelle) Pilbeam 1996; Thelocactus hexaedrophorus var. fossulatus (Scheidw.) Backeb. 1961; Thelocactus hexaedrophorus subsp. francii Halda & Sladk. 2000; Thelocactus hexaedrophorus subsp. jarmilae Halda & Chvastek 2000; Thelocactus hexaedrophorus subsp. kvetae Chvastek & Halda 2000; Thelocactus hexaedrophorus var. labouretianus (K.Schum.) Pilbeam 1996; Thelocactus hexaedrophorus var. lloydii (Britton & Rose) Kladiwa & Fittkau 1975; Thelocactus hexaedrophorus subsp. lloydii (Britton & Rose) N.P.Taylor 1998; Thelocactus hexaedrophorus var. major (Quehl) Y.Itô 1952; Thelocactus hexaedrophorus var. paradensis Pilbeam 1996; Thelocactus lloydii Britton & Rose 1923

= Thelocactus hexaedrophorus =

Species of cactus

Thelocactus hexaedrophorus is a species of cactus. It is endemic to Mexico.

== Description ==
Thelocactus hexaedrophorus grows solitary, it is a spherical cactus, 3 to 7.5 cm (1.2 to 3.0 in) tall and 8 to 15 cm (3.1 to 5.9 in) in diameter, with a bluish, olive-green, or gray-green body. It has 8 to 13 ribs dissolved into warty, six-sided tubercles, 8 to 20 mm (0.31 to 0.79 in) long and 13 to 26 mm (0.51 to 1.02 in) wide. Areoles are 4 to 13 mm (0.16 to 0.51 in) long, spaced 2 to 3.5 cm (0.79 to 1.38 in) apart. The plant features 4 to 8 radial spines, 5 to 60 mm (0.20 to 2.36 in) long, in colors ranging from white to ocher, reddish, or brown, and a central spine 2 to 3 cm (0.79 to 1.18 in) long. Flowers are large, 5 to 10 cm (2.0 to 3.9 in) wide, ranging from white to pale pink. The fruits are green to magenta, 7 to 11 mm (0.28 to 0.43 in) in size, and dry when open.

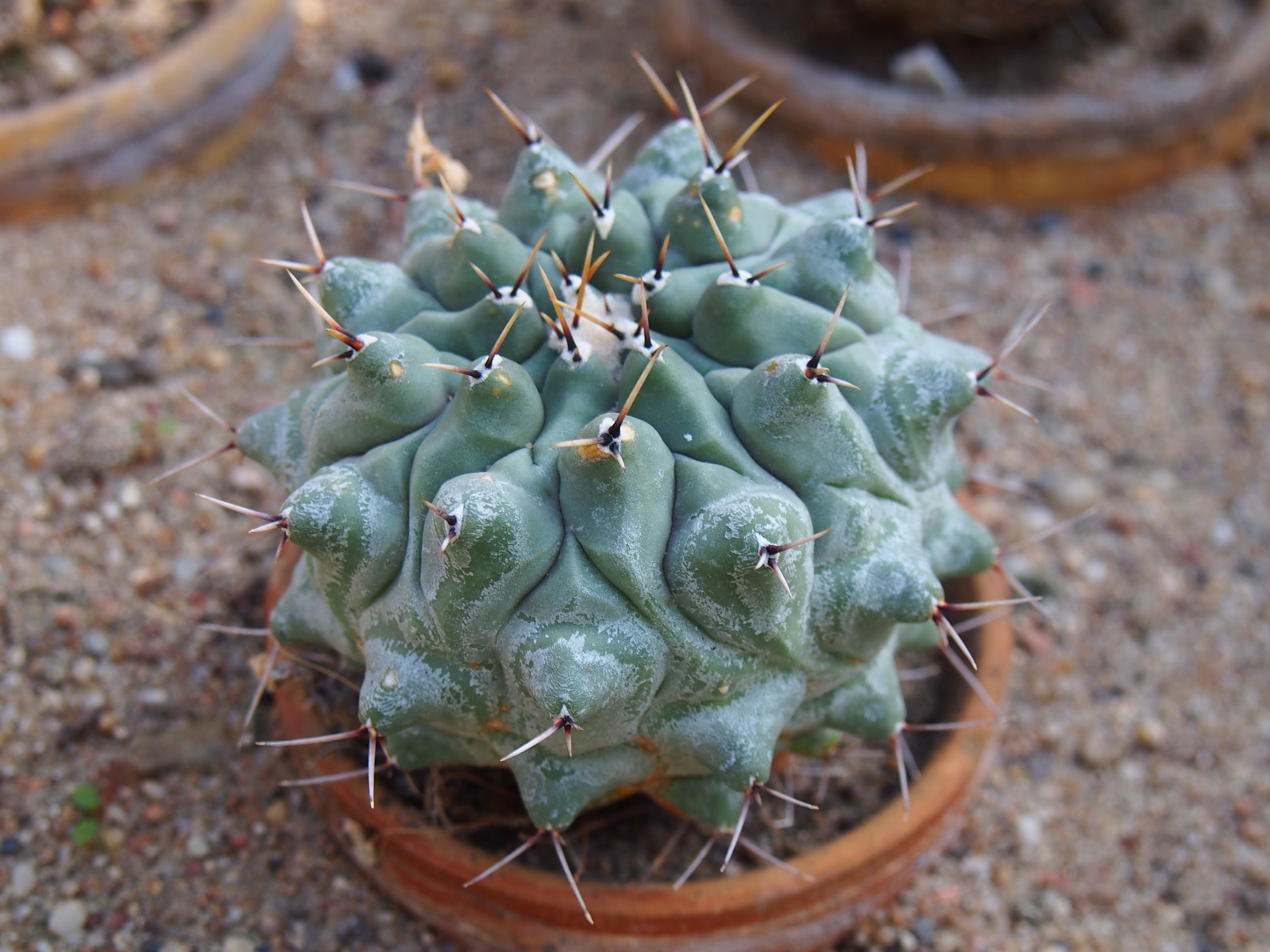
Plant

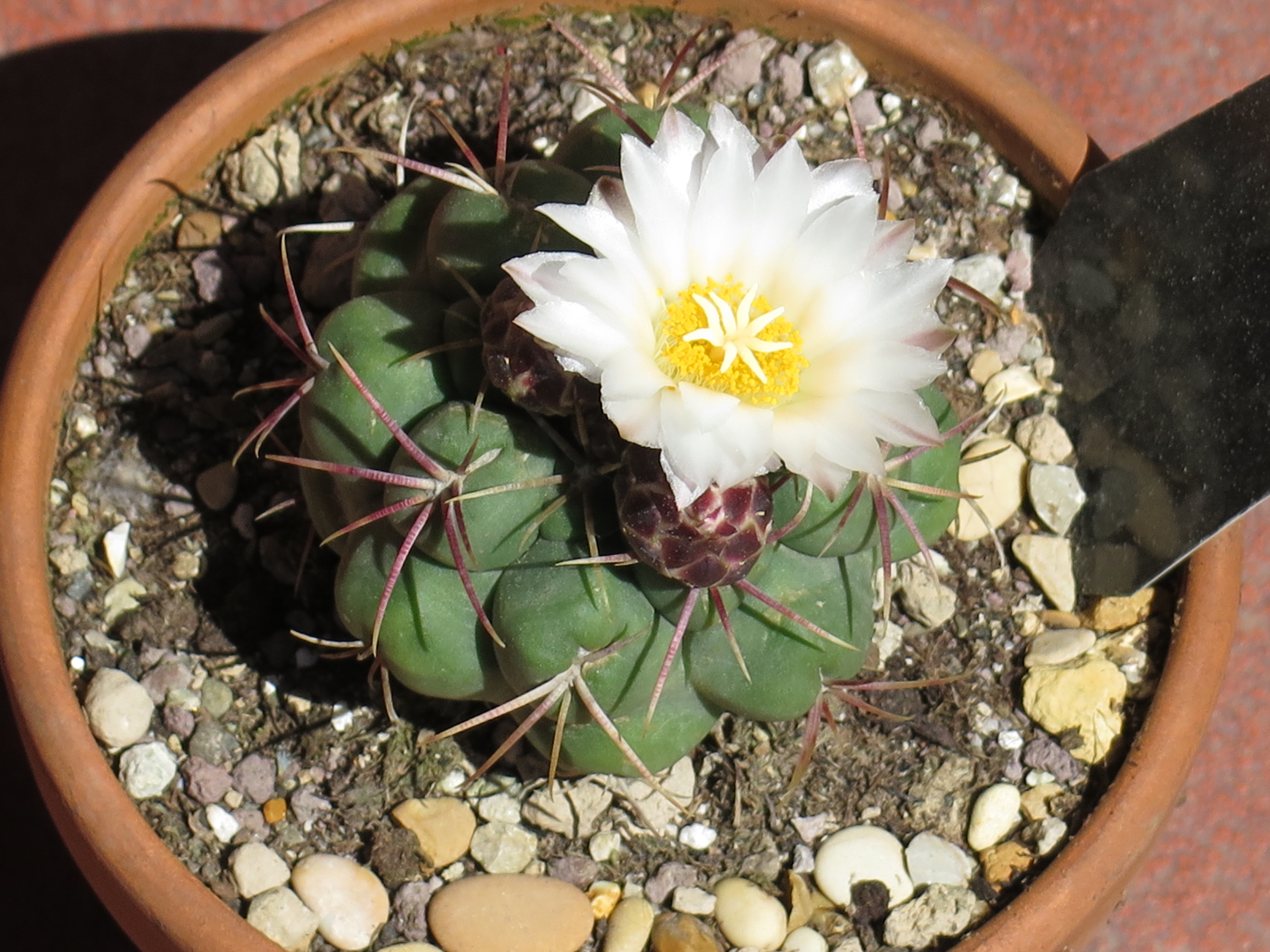
Blooming Plant

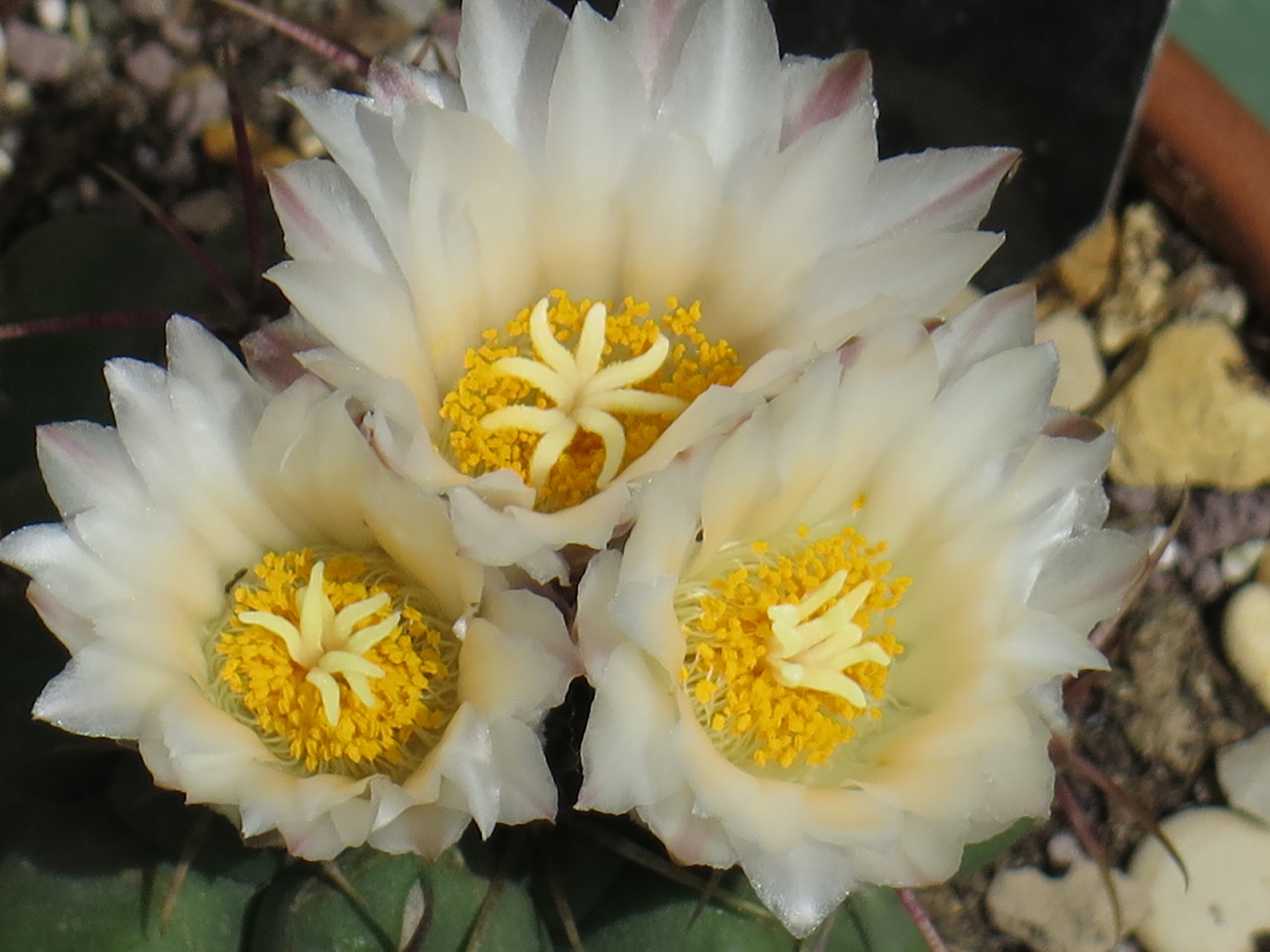
Flowers

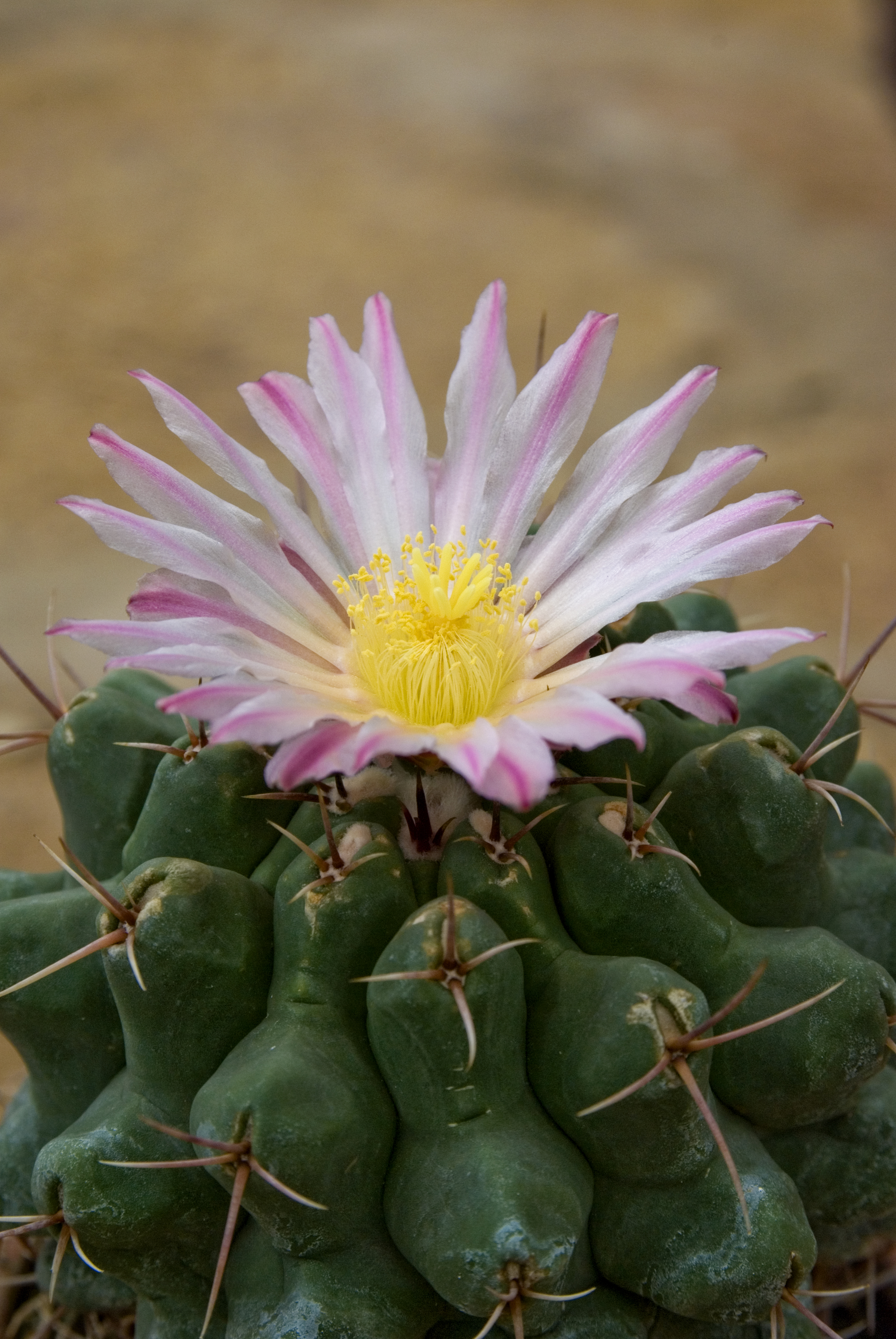
Pink flower form

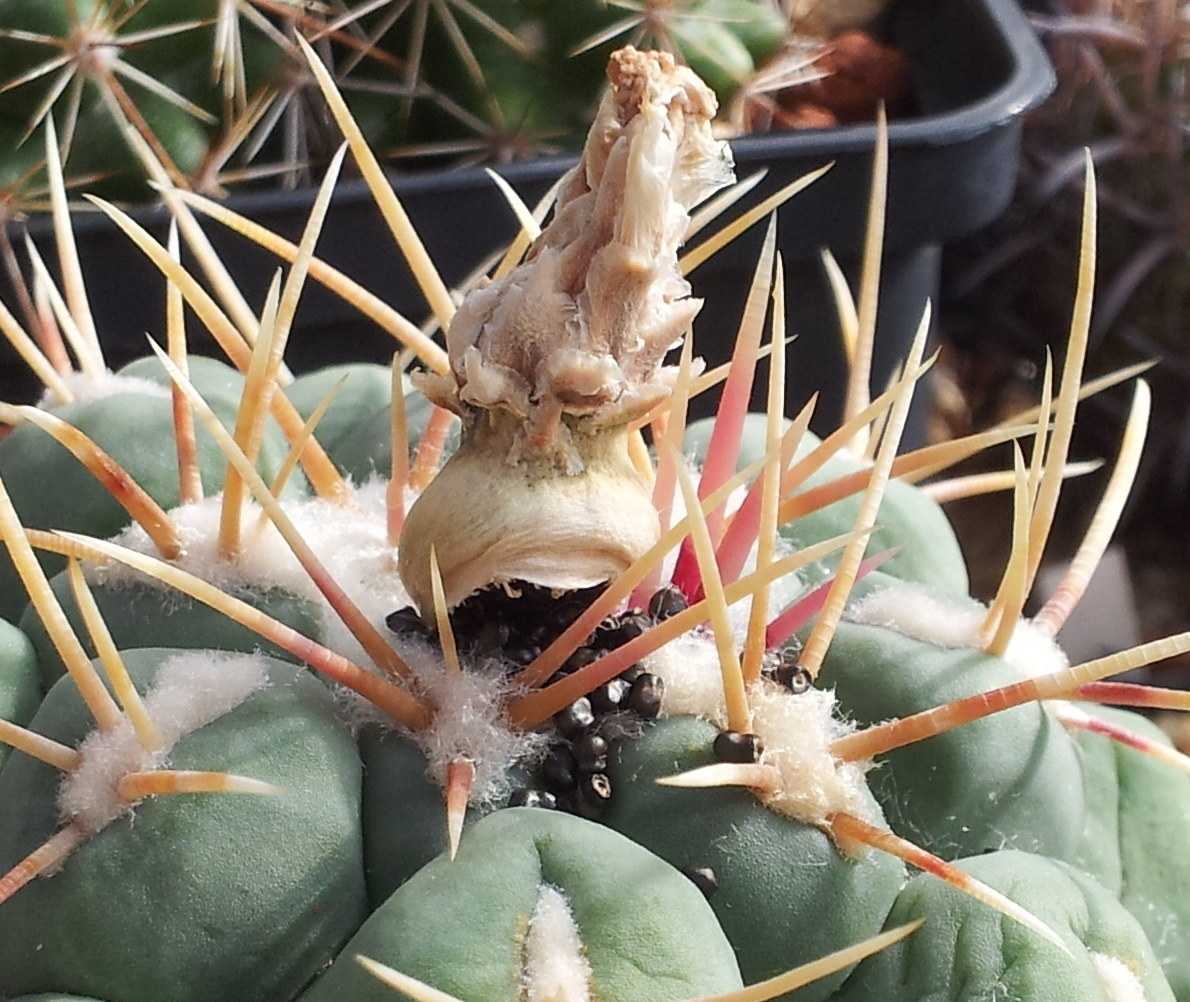
Fruit

== Distribution ==
Thelocactus hexaedrophorus is endemic to the limestone slopes in the Chihuahuan Desert, savanna, and grasslands of San Luis Potosí, Zacatecas, Tamaulipas, and Nuevo León, Mexico at elevations between 1100 and 2000 meters. Plants are found growing along with Mammillaria parkinsonii, Mammillaria aureilanata, Ariocarpus retusus, Turbinicarpus saueri subsp. knuthianus , Coryphantha maiz-tablasensis, Astrophytum myriostigma, Echinocactus platyacanthus, Echinocereus enneacanthus var. carnosus, Coryphantha cornifera, Ferocactus latispinus, Echinocereus pectinatus, Echinocereus cinerascens, Opuntia rastrera, Opuntia lindheimeri, Cylindropuntia imbricata, Myrtillocactus geometrizans, Polaskia chende, Agave salmiana, Yucca filifera, Jatropha dioica and Fritillaria affinis.

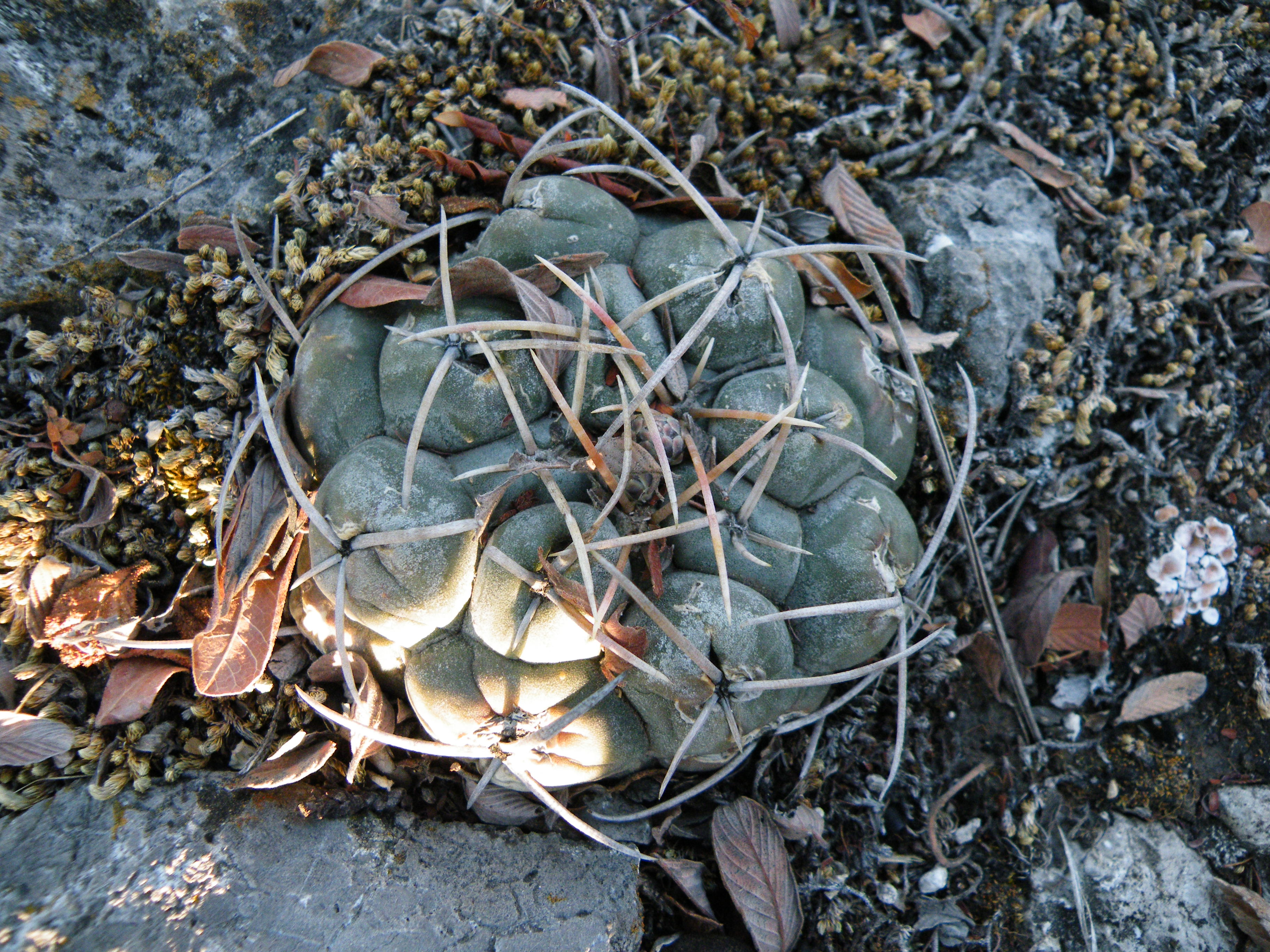
Plant growing in Guadalcázar, San Luis Potosí

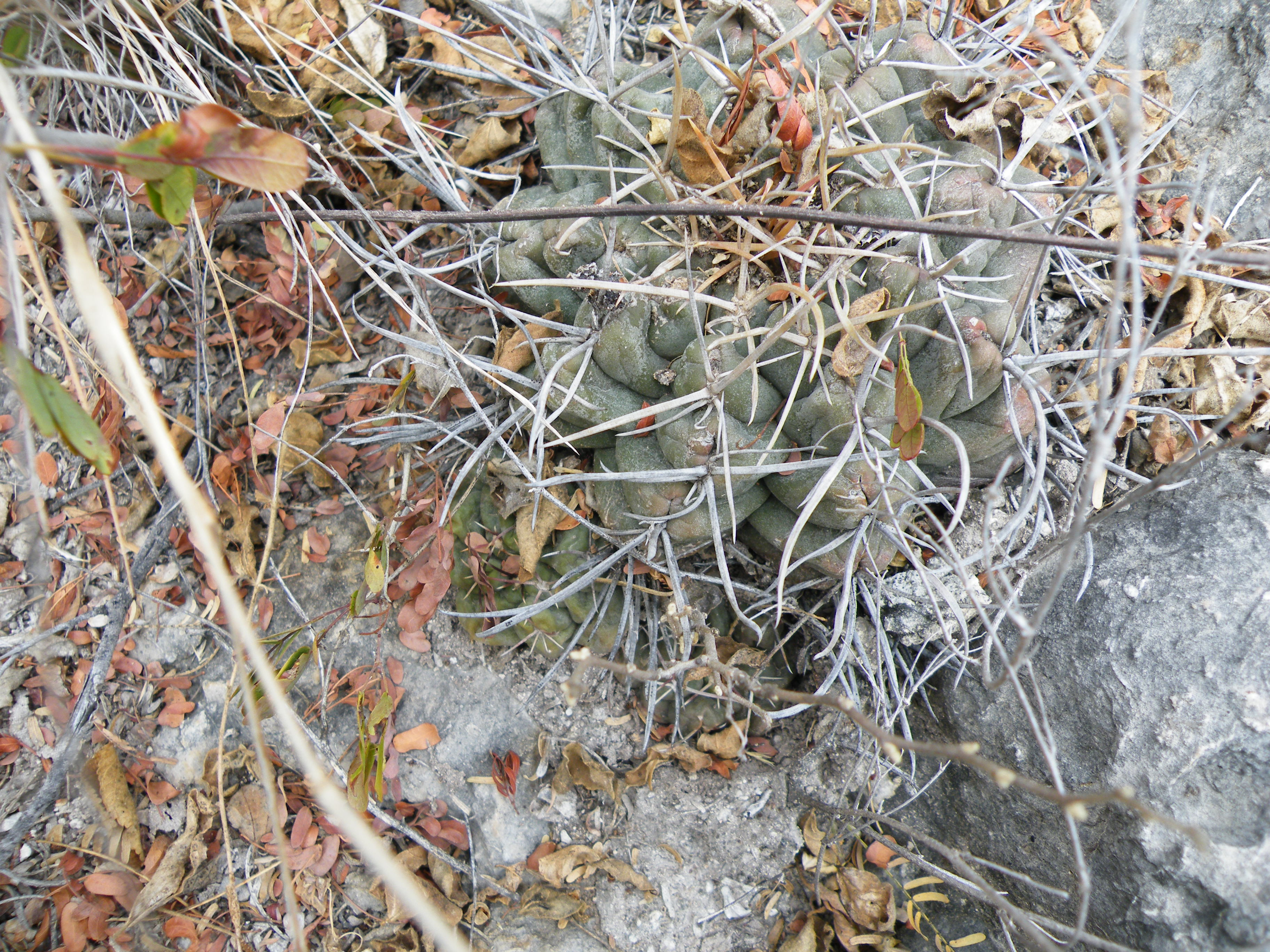
Plant growing near La Muralla, San Luis Potosí

== Taxonomy ==
The plant was first described as Echinocactus hexaedrophorus by Charles Lemaire in 1839, and later placed in the genus Thelocactus by Britton and Rose in 1922. The specific epithet hexaedrophorus is derived from the Greek words hexa- for 'six', hedra for 'level' and -phoros for 'bearing' and refers to hexagonal warts of the species.
