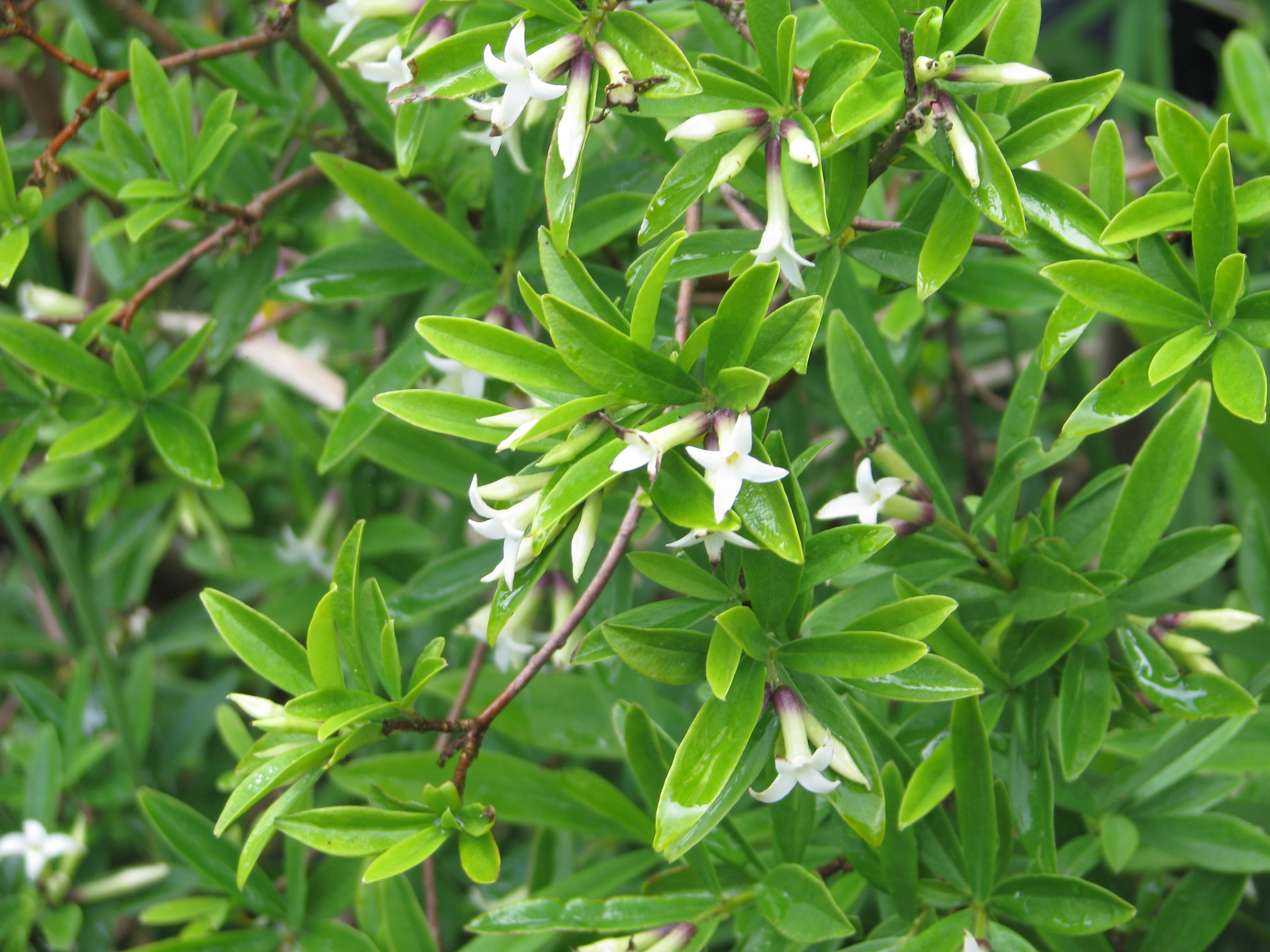
- Daphne longilobata

Scientific classification
- Kingdom: Plantae
- Clade: Embryophytes
- Clade: Tracheophytes
- Clade: Spermatophytes
- Clade: Angiosperms
- Clade: Eudicots
- Clade: Rosids
- Order: Malvales
- Family: Thymelaeaceae
- Genus: Daphne
- Species: D. longilobata

Binomial name
- Daphne longilobata (Lecomte) Turrill

Synonyms
- Daphne altaica var. longilobata Lecomte

= Daphne longilobata =

Species of shrub

Daphne longilobata is a shrub, of the family Thymelaeaceae. It is native to China, specifically eastern Tibet, southwestern Sichuan, and northwestern Yunnan.

== Description ==
The shrub is evergreen, and grows to 1.5 meters tall. Its slender branches are pale green. It is often found in forests, shrubby slopes, and among rocks at around 1600–3500 meters in altitude.

== Taxonomy ==
Daphne longilobata was first described by Paul Henri Lecomte in 1916 as Daphne altaica var. longilobata. It was raised to a full species by William Bertram Turrill in 1959. In 1959, Josef Halda treated Daphne purpurascens as a subspecies of D. longilobata, but this was not accepted by Plants of the World Online as of October 2025, nor by the Flora of China.
