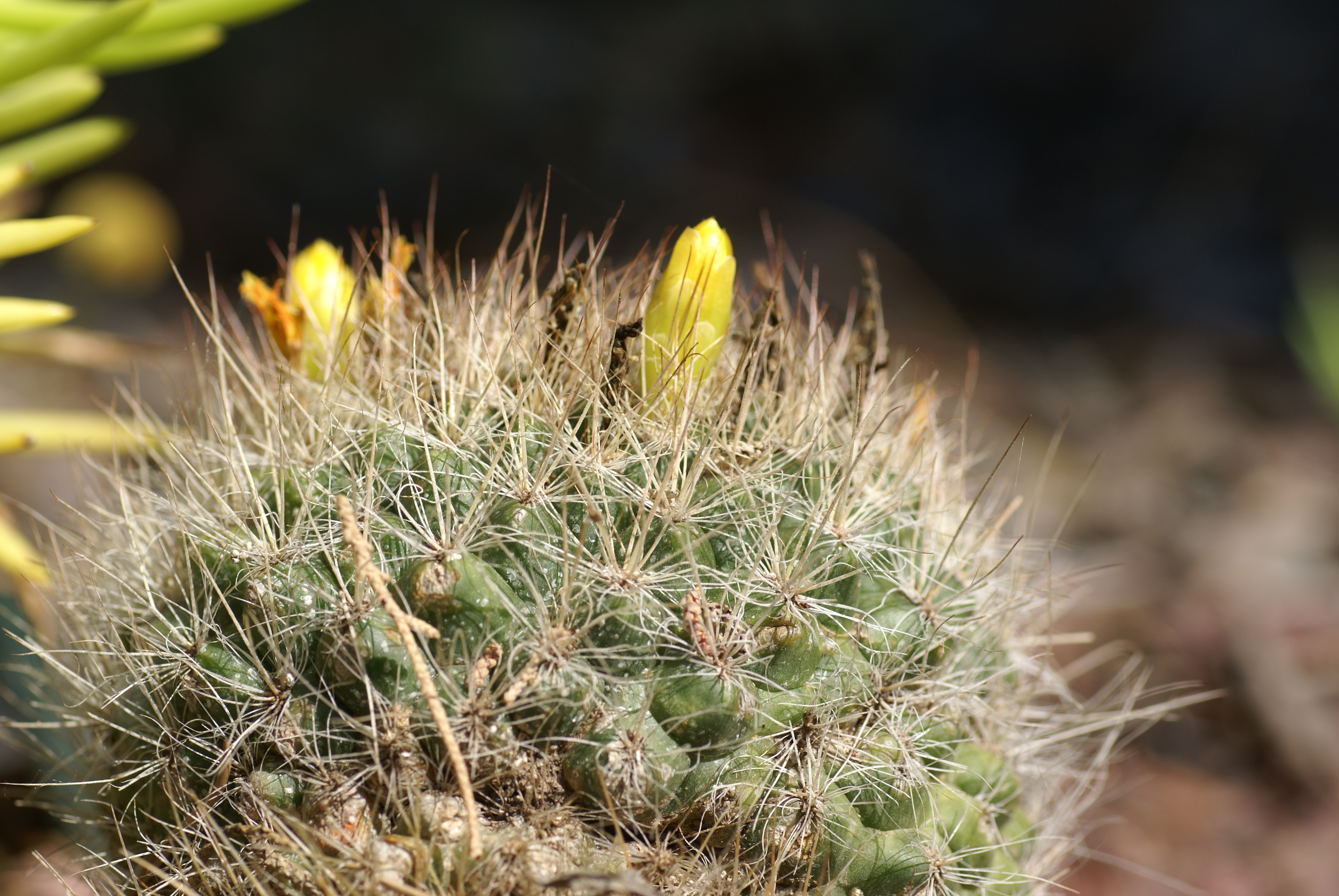

Conservation status
- Least Concern (IUCN 3.1)

Scientific classification
- Kingdom: Plantae
- Clade: Tracheophytes
- Clade: Angiosperms
- Clade: Eudicots
- Order: Caryophyllales
- Family: Cactaceae
- Subfamily: Cactoideae
- Genus: Mammillaria
- Species: M. weingartiana

Binomial name
- Mammillaria weingartiana Boed. 1932

Synonyms
- Chilita weingartiana (Boed.) Buxb. 1954; Ebnerella weingartiana (Boed.) Buxb. 1951; Escobariopsis weingartiana (Boed.) Doweld 2000; Chilita unihamata (Boed.) Buxb. 1954; Ebnerella unihamata (Boed.) Buxb. 1951; Mammillaria unihamata Boed. 1937

= Mammillaria weingartiana =

Species of cactus

Mammillaria weingartiana is a species of plant in the family Cactaceae. It is endemic to Nuevo León state, Mexico.

== Description ==
Mammillaria weingartiana grow solitary or within small groups. It features spherical, slightly glossy, dark green shoots that measure about 4 to 5 centimeters in diameter, with tuberous bases. The plant's tubercles are slender and conical, and it does not produce milky sap. The axils are smooth and glabrous. The plant has a single hooked central spine; later, it develops two to three central spines. These central spines are straight, dark reddish-brown, and can reach up to 12 millimeters in length. Surrounding them are 16 to 25 radial spines that are white and measure between 6 and 8 millimeters long. They have light greenish-yellow to yellowish flowers with reddish-brown mid-veins and fringed edges. They grow up to 1 centimeter long. The small, club-shaped fruits are red and contain black seeds.

== Distribution ==
They live within a terrestrial system, and their habitat can be found on sloping terrains among chalky rocks in deserts in Nuevo León in Mexico at elevations between 2000 and 2300 meters.. The subpopulations are small and scattered widely within a large range. Plants are found growing along with Opuntia rastrera, Cylindropuntia tunicata, and Asphodeline lutea.

The average temperature that they can live in is about 50 °F. They do best in light shade sun exposure.

== Taxonomy ==
This species was first described in 1932 by Friedrich Bödeker. Its specific name, weingartiana, honors Wilhelm Weingart, a German cactus expert and collector from Thuringia.

== Conservation ==
This species is recorded to be vulnerable to becoming an endangered species due to illegal collecting of this cactus for the commercial and amateur trade. Within the last ten years, there has been a ten percent decrease in the population and the population trend is currently decreasing.
