= Daphne purpurascens =

Scientific classification
- Kingdom: Plantae
- Clade: Tracheophytes
- Clade: Angiosperms
- Clade: Eudicots
- Clade: Rosids
- Order: Malvales
- Family: Thymelaeaceae
- Genus: Daphne
- Species: D. purpurascens

Binomial name
- Daphne purpurascens S.C.Huang

Synonyms
- Daphne longilobata subsp. purpurascens (S.C.Huang) Halda

Species of plant

Daphne purpurascens is a species of flowering plant in the family Thymelaeaceae, native to Tibet. It was first described in 1985.

== Description ==
The shrub is evergreen, and grows from 1.5 to 2.0 m tall. Its branches grow dense in its pubescent growth stages. It is often found on shrubby slopes at altitudes of 2,600 to 3,100 m.

== Taxonomy ==
Daphne purpurascens was first described in 1985. In 1999, Josef Halda reduced it to a subspecies of Daphne longilobata. This is not accepted by Plants of the World Online as of October 2025, nor by the Flora of China, which distinguishes D. purpurascens by its shorter purplish-red calyx rather than a longer pale green, cream or white calyx.
