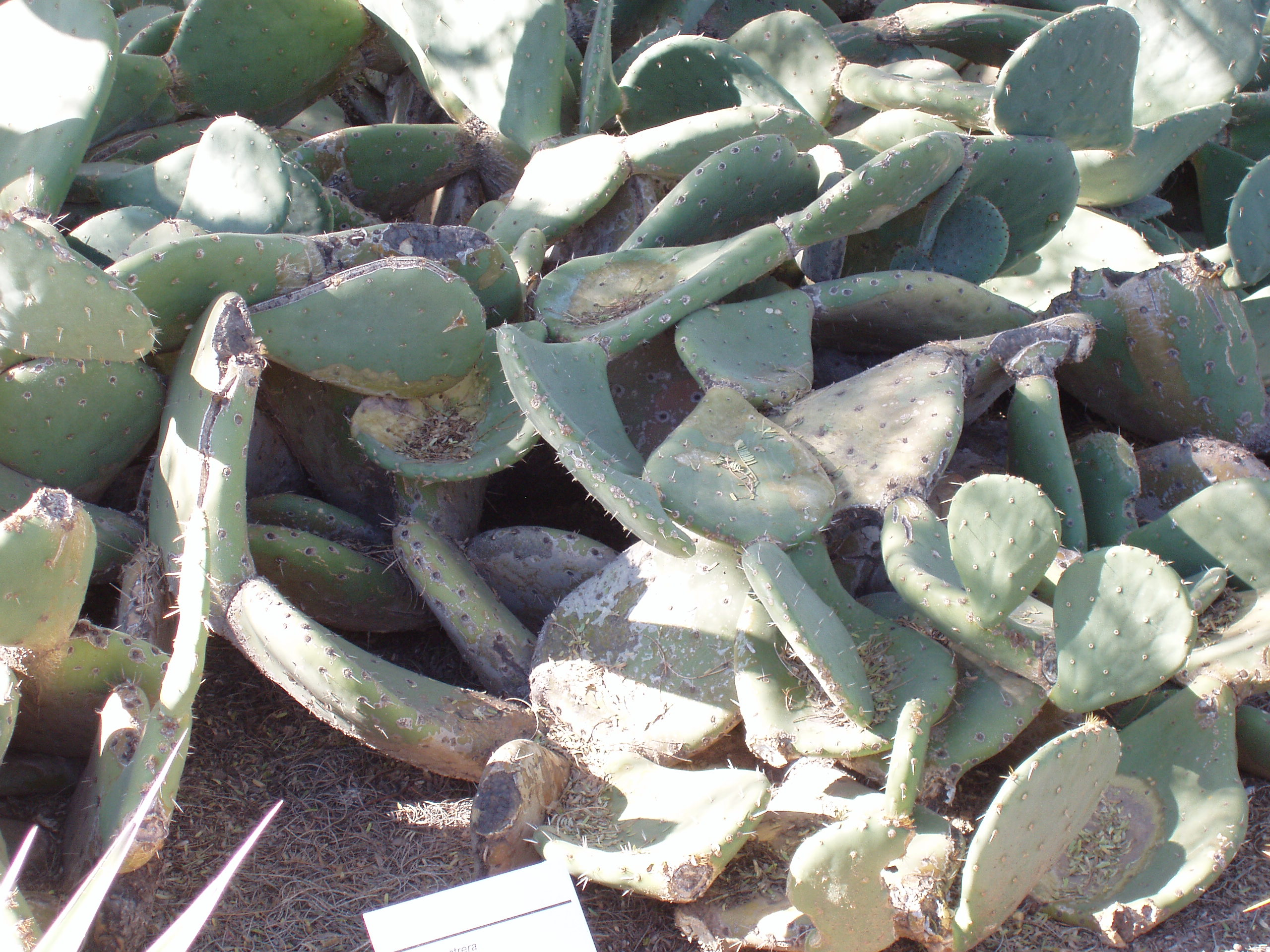

Scientific classification
- Kingdom: Plantae
- Clade: Tracheophytes
- Clade: Angiosperms
- Clade: Eudicots
- Order: Caryophyllales
- Family: Cactaceae
- Genus: Opuntia
- Species: O. rastrera

Binomial name
- Opuntia rastrera F. A. C. Weber

= Opuntia rastrera =

Species of cactus

Opuntia rastrera is a prickly pear which grows in the Mexican state of San Luis Potosí. It is known in Spanish as cuija, although that name can also refer to other cactuses such as Brasiliopuntia.

== Description ==
Opuntia rastrera can be found in bajada, hill-piedmont, and interdune habitats in locations such as the Mapimi biosphere reserve, where it is sometimes the most common cactus in a given location, or sometimes a secondary cactus.

=== Propagation ===
In order to germinate, the seeds require a dormancy period of at least a year. As with other Opuntia species, mechanical or chemical scarification does not seem to help.

The species can reproduce either vegetatively or by seed. In fact, the nature of the habitat determines which is more common, with sexual reproduction dominating in grasslands and vegetative propagation dominating in scrublands.
