= Joseph Halda =

Czech botanist (born 1943)

Josef Halda
- Born: 7 December 1943 (age 82)
- Occupations: horticulturist and botanist
- Scientific career
- Author abbrev. (botany): Halda

Josef Jakob Halda (born 7 December 1943) is a Czech botanist who worked at the Institute of Botany of the Czechoslovak Socialist Republic. He became a member of the Czech Botanical Society in 1987. He studied the flora of the Czech Republic and made a number of expeditions to Mexico. As a scientist, he studied the taxonomy of genera Paeonia, Daphne and Haworthia. He also published popular books such as The genus Primula in cultivation and the wild, which was illustrated by his wife Jarmila Haldová. He proposed new names and combinations such as Begonia jarmilae and Conophytum jarmilae (after his wife), Gentiana arethusae subsp. delicatula (C.Marquand) Halda and ×Jankaendron Halda.

Later, he collected seeds of primarily alpine plants across Europe and Asia, which he sold to gardeners throughout the world.

== Publications ==
The standard author abbreviation Halda is used to indicate this person as the author when citing a botanical name.

=== Science articles ===
- Some taxonomic problems in the genus Daphne L.II (1996). Acta Musei Richnoviensis 6 (3)
- New descriptions and combinations Trillium ×crockeranum (1996), with L. Horáček. Acta Musei Richnoviensis 6 (3)
- Systematic treatment of the Genus Paeonia L. with some nomenclatural changes (1997). Acta Musei Richnoviensis 4 (2)
- Synopsis of the Genus Haworthia Duval, with some nomenclatural changes (1997). Acta Musei Richnoviensis 4 (2)
- Dwarf succulent saxifragas (section Porphyrion Engler & Irmscher) (1997). Acta Musei Richnoviensis 4 (2)

=== Popular books ===
- The genus Primula in cultivation and the wild (1992). Tethys Books
- The Genus Gentiana (1996). Sen Dobre
- The Genus Paeonia (2004) with J.W. Waddick. Timber Press
