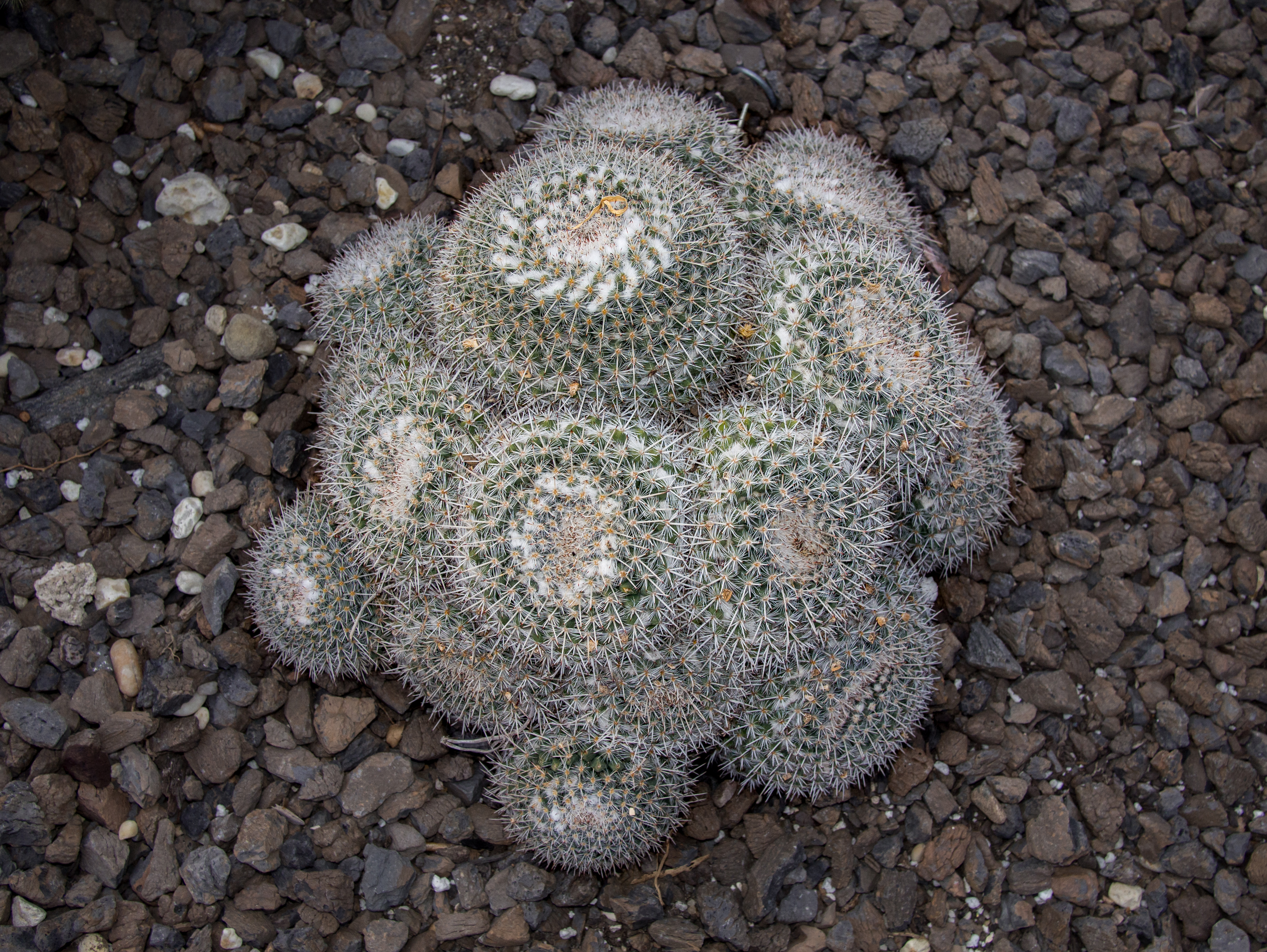

Scientific classification
- Kingdom: Plantae
- Clade: Tracheophytes
- Clade: Angiosperms
- Clade: Eudicots
- Order: Caryophyllales
- Family: Cactaceae
- Subfamily: Cactoideae
- Genus: Mammillaria
- Species: M. parkinsonii

Binomial name
- Mammillaria parkinsonii Ehrenberg

= Mammillaria parkinsonii =

Species of cactus

Mammillaria parkinsonii, also known as owl-eye pincushion or owl-eye cactus, is a species of flowering plant in the family Cactaceae. It is endemic to Queretaro, Mexico. Mammillaria parkinsonii is listed as Endangered due to a limited distribution (extent of occurrence ca 2,500 km2), severe fragmentation, a continuing decline due to illegal collection, and degradation of its habitat across its range. Clarification of the taxonomic status of this species is a research priority.

It was first described by Ehrenberg in 1840 in Linnaea 14: 375.
