= Sirani =

Sirani may refer to:

- Anna Maria Sirani (1645–1715), Italian painter, sister of Elisabetta Sirani
- Elisabetta Sirani (1638–1665), Italian painter
- Giovanni Andrea Sirani (1610–1670), Italian painter, father of Anna Maria and Elisabetta
- Cerani (mountain) or Serani, an Andean mountain in Peru
- Acrobasis sirani, a species of snout moth in the genus Acrobasis
- Sirani, Pakistan, a village in Sindh, Pakistan
