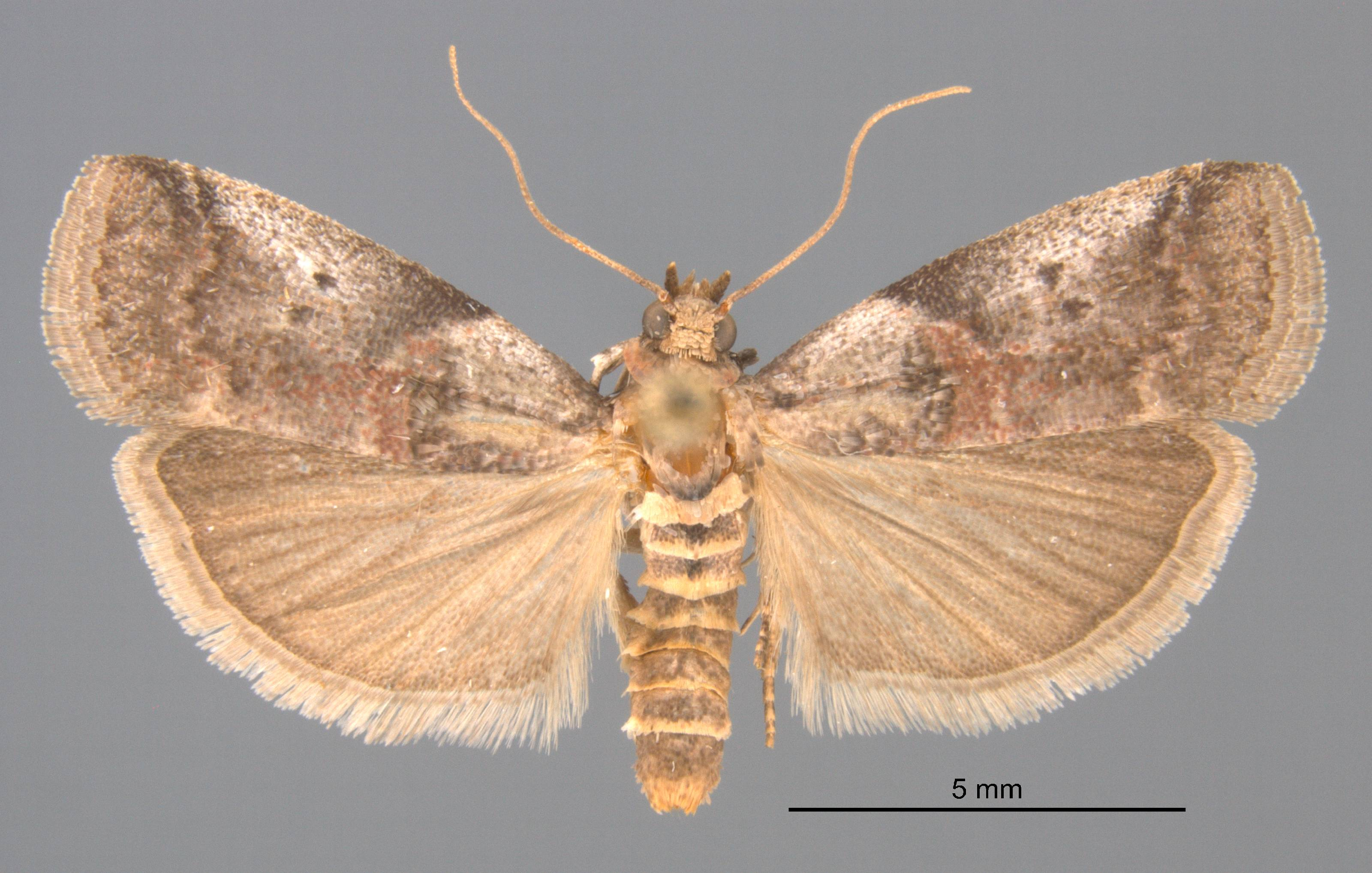

Scientific classification
- Kingdom: Animalia
- Phylum: Arthropoda
- Clade: Pancrustacea
- Class: Insecta
- Order: Lepidoptera
- Family: Pyralidae
- Genus: Acrobasis
- Species: A. normella

Binomial name
- Acrobasis normella Dyar, 1908

Synonyms
- Acrobasis malipennella Dyar, 1908; Acrobasis secundella Ely, 1913

= Acrobasis normella =

Species of moth

Acrobasis normella is a species of snout moth in the genus Acrobasis. It was described by Harrison Gray Dyar Jr. in 1908, and is known from Ontario, Canada, and central and eastern United States.

The larvae feed on Corylus americana and Corylus cornuta.
