= Acrobasis birgitella =

Scientific classification
- Kingdom: Animalia
- Phylum: Arthropoda
- Clade: Pancrustacea
- Class: Insecta
- Order: Lepidoptera
- Family: Pyralidae
- Genus: Acrobasis
- Species: A. birgitella

Binomial name
- Acrobasis birgitella (Roesler, 1975)

Synonyms
- Conobathra birgitella Roesler, 1975

Species of moth

Acrobasis birgitella is a species of snout moth in the genus Acrobasis. It was described by Roesler in 1975. It is found in China and Taiwan.
