= Acrobasis lienpingialis =

Scientific classification
- Kingdom: Animalia
- Phylum: Arthropoda
- Clade: Pancrustacea
- Class: Insecta
- Order: Lepidoptera
- Family: Pyralidae
- Genus: Acrobasis
- Species: A. lienpingialis

Binomial name
- Acrobasis lienpingialis (Caradja, 1925)

Synonyms
- Rhodophaea lienpingialis Caradja, 1925

Species of moth

Acrobasis lienpingialis is a species of snout moth in the genus Acrobasis. It was described by Aristide Caradja in 1925. It is found in China.
