= Acrobasis homoeosomidia =

Scientific classification
- Kingdom: Animalia
- Phylum: Arthropoda
- Clade: Pancrustacea
- Class: Insecta
- Order: Lepidoptera
- Family: Pyralidae
- Genus: Acrobasis
- Species: A. homoeosomidia

Binomial name
- Acrobasis homoeosomidia (Hampson, 1901)

Synonyms
- Numonia homoeosomidia Hampson, 1901

Species of moth

Acrobasis homoeosomidia is a species of snout moth in the genus Acrobasis. It was described by George Hampson in 1901. It is found in Peninsular Malaysia.
