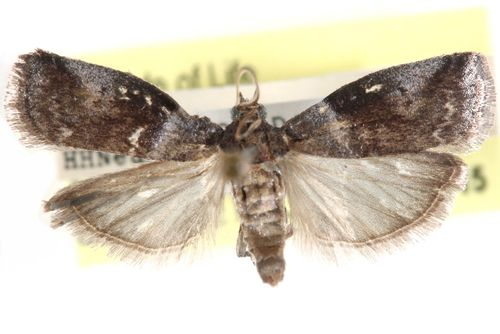

Scientific classification
- Kingdom: Animalia
- Phylum: Arthropoda
- Clade: Pancrustacea
- Class: Insecta
- Order: Lepidoptera
- Family: Pyralidae
- Genus: Acrobasis
- Species: A. evanescentella

Binomial name
- Acrobasis evanescentella Dyar, 1908

= Acrobasis evanescentella =

Species of moth

Acrobasis evanescentella is a species of snout moth in the genus Acrobasis. It was described by Harrison Gray Dyar Jr., in 1908, and is known from southern Georgia and Florida.

There is probably only one generation per year with adults on wing in late May.

The larvae feed on Carya species, including Carya illinoinensis. They tunnel into the shoots of their host plant.
