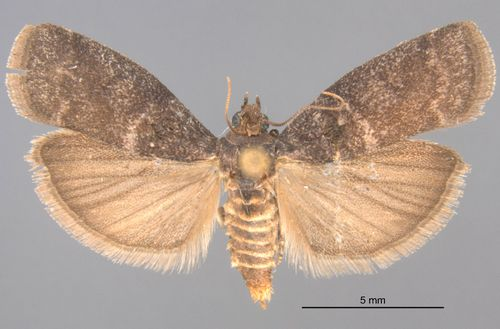

Scientific classification
- Kingdom: Animalia
- Phylum: Arthropoda
- Clade: Pancrustacea
- Class: Insecta
- Order: Lepidoptera
- Family: Pyralidae
- Genus: Acrobasis
- Species: A. betulivorella

Binomial name
- Acrobasis betulivorella Neunzig, 1975

= Acrobasis betulivorella =

Species of moth

Acrobasis betulivorella is a species of snout moth in the genus Acrobasis. It was described by Herbert H. Neunzig in 1975 and is often found in the eastern United States.

The larvae feed on Betula species including Betula nigra.
