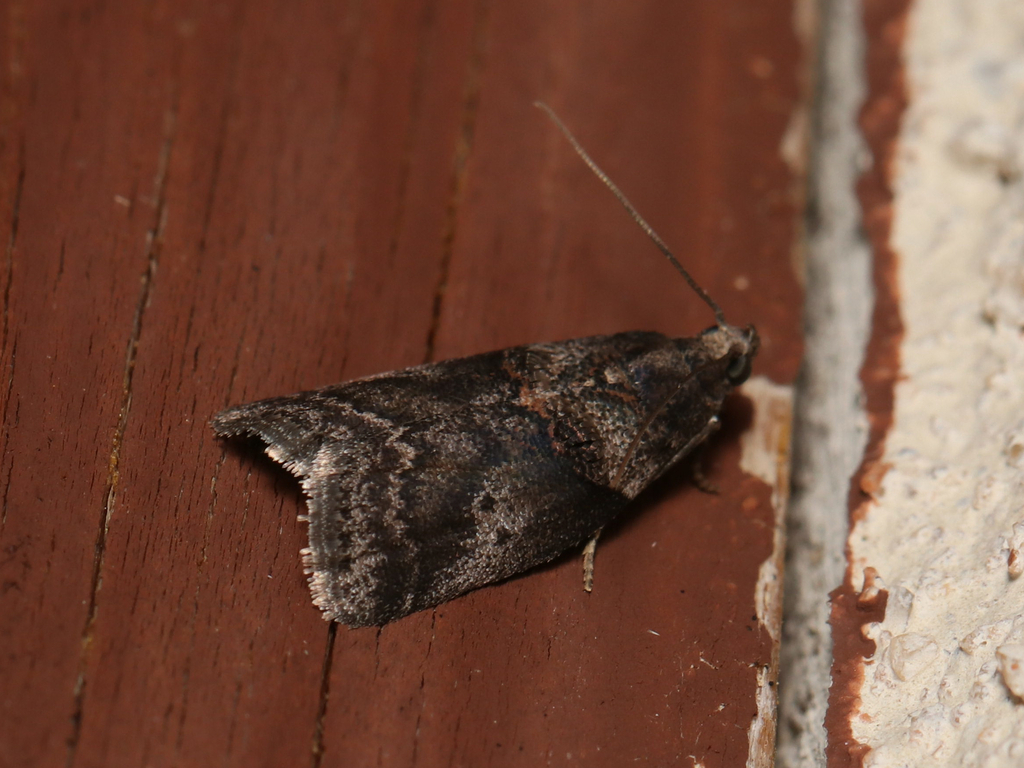

Scientific classification
- Kingdom: Animalia
- Phylum: Arthropoda
- Clade: Pancrustacea
- Class: Insecta
- Order: Lepidoptera
- Family: Pyralidae
- Genus: Acrobasis
- Species: A. elyi

Binomial name
- Acrobasis elyi Neunzig, 1970

= Acrobasis elyi =

Species of moth

Acrobasis elyi is a species of snout moth in the genus Acrobasis. It was described by Herbert H. Neunzig in 1970, and is known from Connecticut to Florida in the United States.

There is one generation per year.

The larvae feed on Carya species including Carya tomentosa. The species overwinters in the larval stage.
