= Acrobasis sasakii =

Scientific classification
- Kingdom: Animalia
- Phylum: Arthropoda
- Clade: Pancrustacea
- Class: Insecta
- Order: Lepidoptera
- Family: Pyralidae
- Genus: Acrobasis
- Species: A. sasakii

Binomial name
- Acrobasis sasakii Yamanaka, 2003

Species of moth

Acrobasis sasakii is a species of snout moth in the genus Acrobasis. It was described by Hiroshi Yamanaka in 2003 and is endemic to Japan.
