= Acrobasis eburnella =

Scientific classification
- Kingdom: Animalia
- Phylum: Arthropoda
- Clade: Pancrustacea
- Class: Insecta
- Order: Lepidoptera
- Family: Pyralidae
- Genus: Acrobasis
- Species: A. eburnella

Binomial name
- Acrobasis eburnella (Amsel, 1954)

Synonyms
- Rhodophaea eburnella Amsel, 1954

Species of moth

Acrobasis eburnella is a species of snout moth in the genus Acrobasis. It was described by Hans Georg Amsel in 1954. It is found in Iran.
