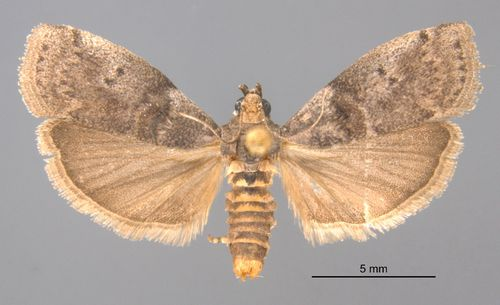

Scientific classification
- Kingdom: Animalia
- Phylum: Arthropoda
- Clade: Pancrustacea
- Class: Insecta
- Order: Lepidoptera
- Family: Pyralidae
- Genus: Acrobasis
- Species: A. carpinivorella

Binomial name
- Acrobasis carpinivorella Neunzig, 1970

= Acrobasis carpinivorella =

Species of moth

Acrobasis carpinivorella is a species of snout moth in the genus Acrobasis. It was described by Herbert H. Neunzig in 1970, and is known from Ontario, Canada, and the eastern United States.

There is one generation per year.
