= Acrobasis modisequa =

Scientific classification
- Kingdom: Animalia
- Phylum: Arthropoda
- Clade: Pancrustacea
- Class: Insecta
- Order: Lepidoptera
- Family: Pyralidae
- Genus: Acrobasis
- Species: A. modisequa

Binomial name
- Acrobasis modisequa Meyrick, 1934

Species of moth

Acrobasis modisequa is a species of snout moth in the genus Acrobasis. It was described by Edward Meyrick in 1934. It is found on Java.
