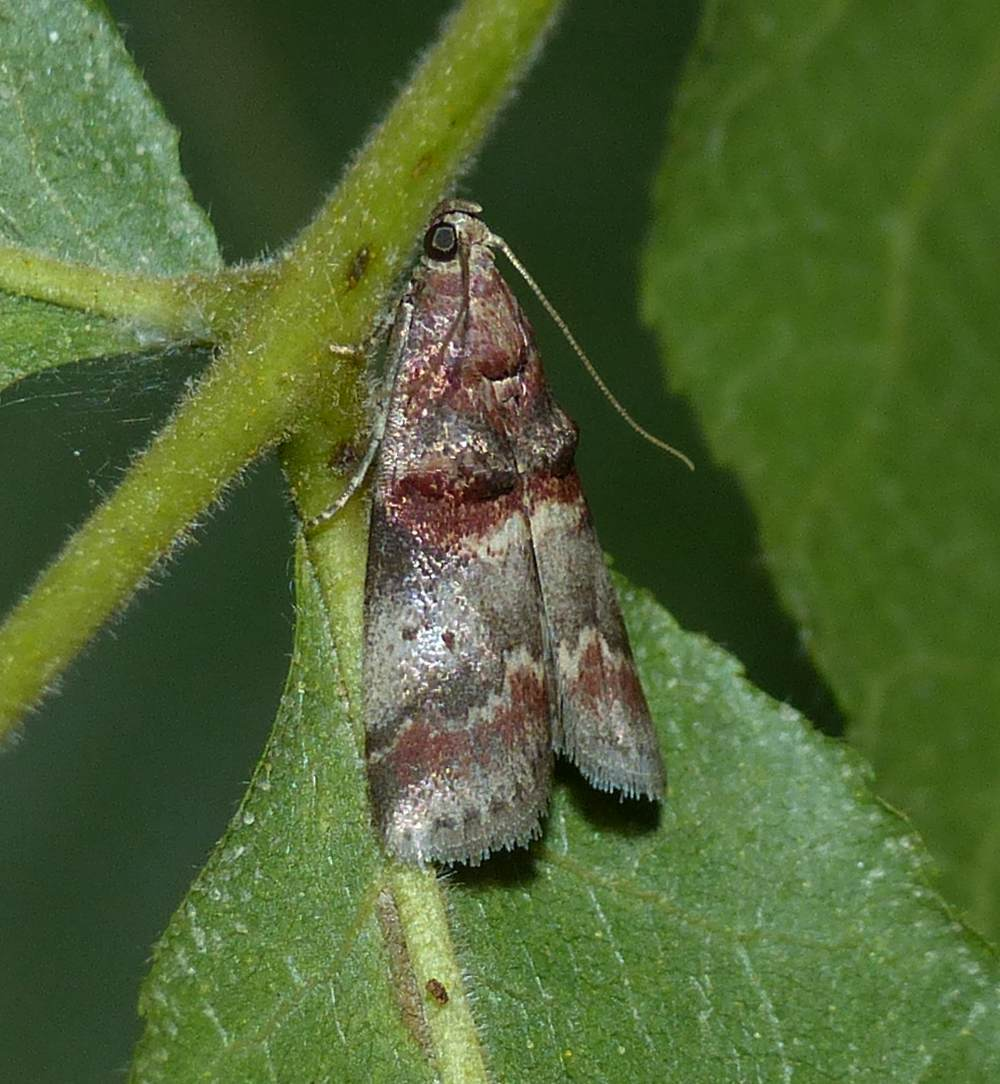

Scientific classification
- Kingdom: Animalia
- Phylum: Arthropoda
- Clade: Pancrustacea
- Class: Insecta
- Order: Lepidoptera
- Family: Pyralidae
- Genus: Acrobasis
- Species: A. angusella

Binomial name
- Acrobasis angusella Grote, 1880

Synonyms
- Acrobasis eliella Dyar, 1908

= Acrobasis angusella =

Species of moth

Acrobasis angusella, the hickory leafstem borer or leafstem borer, is a species of snout moth. It was described by Augustus Radcliffe Grote in 1880, and is known from Quebec, Canada, and the north-eastern United States.

The wingspan is about 18 mm. Adults are on wing from May to September.

The larvae feed on Carya species, including Carya glabra, Carya ovalis and Carya tomentosa. They bore in the leaf stems of their host plant, causing the leaves to fall off.
