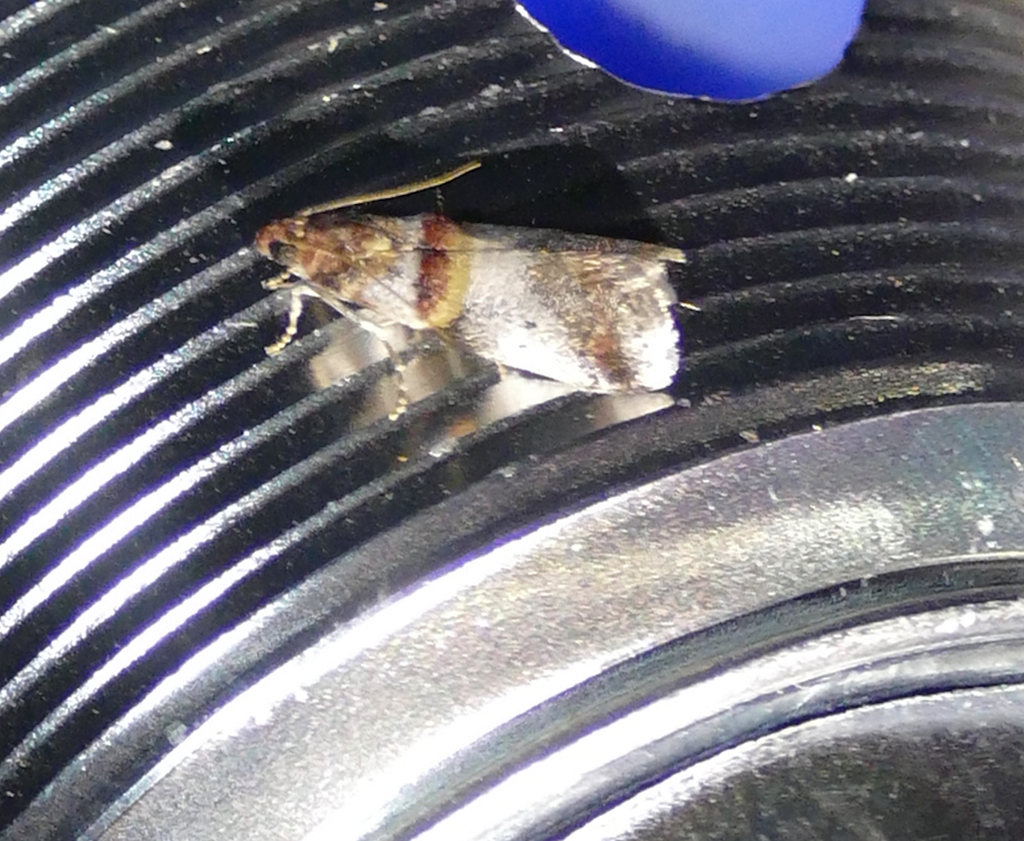

Scientific classification
- Kingdom: Animalia
- Phylum: Arthropoda
- Clade: Pancrustacea
- Class: Insecta
- Order: Lepidoptera
- Family: Pyralidae
- Genus: Acrobasis
- Species: A. blanchardorum

Binomial name
- Acrobasis blanchardorum Neunzig, 1973

= Acrobasis blanchardorum =

Species of moth

Acrobasis blanchardorum is a species of snout moth in the genus Acrobasis. It was described by Herbert H. Neunzig in 1973 and is known from North America, including the type location of Texas.

The larvae feed on Quercus species including Quercus grisea.
