= Acrobasis diversicolor =

Scientific classification
- Kingdom: Animalia
- Phylum: Arthropoda
- Clade: Pancrustacea
- Class: Insecta
- Order: Lepidoptera
- Family: Pyralidae
- Genus: Acrobasis
- Species: A. diversicolor

Binomial name
- Acrobasis diversicolor Ragonot, 1893

Species of moth

Acrobasis diversicolor is a species of snout moth in the genus Acrobasis. It was described by Ragonot in 1893. It is found in South Africa.
