= Acrobasis cymindella =

Scientific classification
- Kingdom: Animalia
- Phylum: Arthropoda
- Clade: Pancrustacea
- Class: Insecta
- Order: Lepidoptera
- Family: Pyralidae
- Genus: Acrobasis
- Species: A. cymindella

Binomial name
- Acrobasis cymindella (Ragonot, 1893)

Synonyms
- Numonia cymindella Ragonot, 1893

Species of moth

Acrobasis cymindella is a species of snout moth in the genus Acrobasis. It was described by Ragonot in 1893. It is found in Russia.
