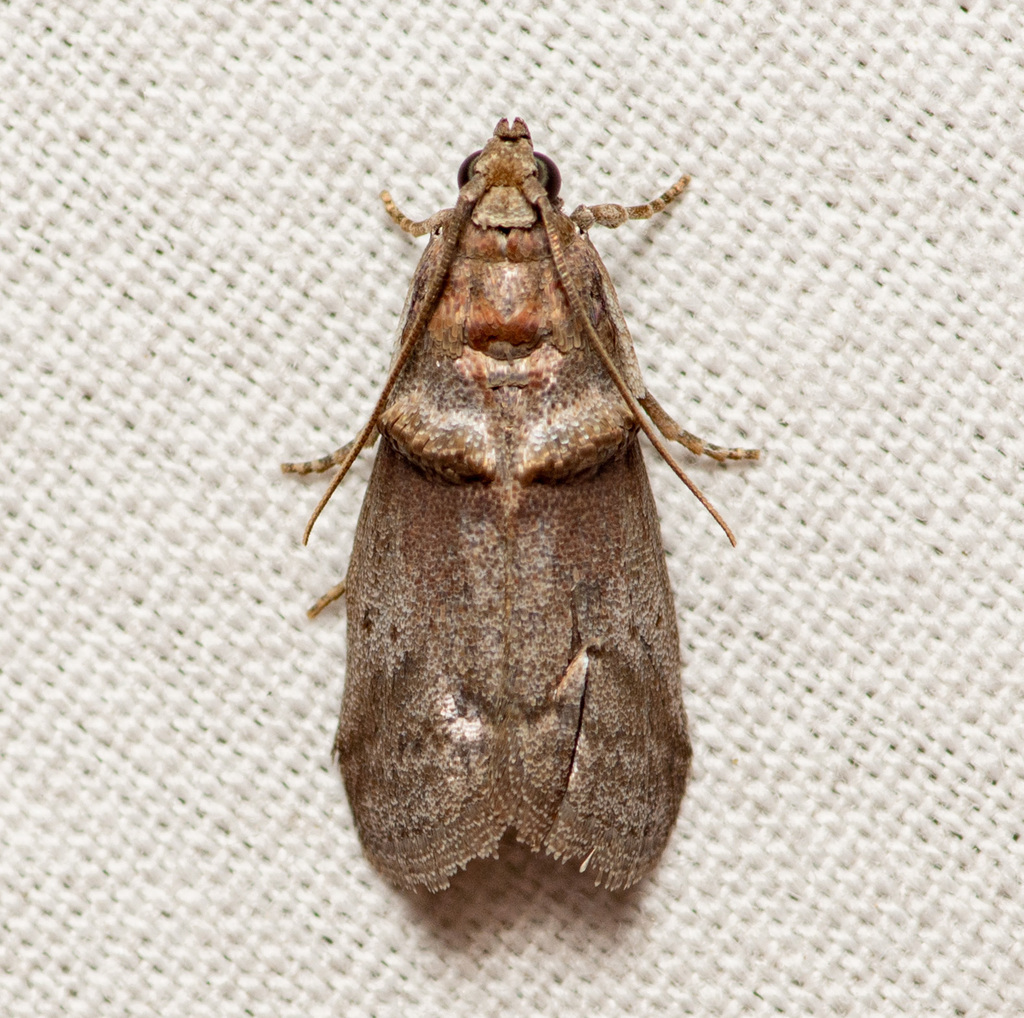

Scientific classification
- Kingdom: Animalia
- Phylum: Arthropoda
- Clade: Pancrustacea
- Class: Insecta
- Order: Lepidoptera
- Family: Pyralidae
- Genus: Acrobasis
- Species: A. texana

Binomial name
- Acrobasis texana Neunzig, 1986

= Acrobasis texana =

Species of moth

Acrobasis texana is a species of snout moth in the genus Acrobasis. It was described by Herbert H. Neunzig in 1986, and is known from the US state of Texas, from which its species epithet is derived.
