= Acrobasis rufizonella =

Scientific classification
- Kingdom: Animalia
- Phylum: Arthropoda
- Clade: Pancrustacea
- Class: Insecta
- Order: Lepidoptera
- Family: Pyralidae
- Genus: Acrobasis
- Species: A. rufizonella

Binomial name
- Acrobasis rufizonella Ragonot, 1887

Synonyms
- Conobathra rubiginella Inoue, 1982

Species of moth

Acrobasis rufizonella is a species of snout moth in the genus Acrobasis. It was described by Émile Louis Ragonot in 1887, and is known from south-eastern Siberia, Japan and Taiwan.

The wingspan is 22 mm.
