= Acrobasis aqualidella =

Scientific classification
- Kingdom: Animalia
- Phylum: Arthropoda
- Clade: Pancrustacea
- Class: Insecta
- Order: Lepidoptera
- Family: Pyralidae
- Genus: Acrobasis
- Species: A. aqualidella

Binomial name
- Acrobasis aqualidella Christoph, 1881

Species of moth

Acrobasis aqualidella is a species of snout moth in the genus Acrobasis. It was described by Hugo Theodor Christoph in 1881.
