= Acrobasis ptilophanes =

Scientific classification
- Kingdom: Animalia
- Phylum: Arthropoda
- Clade: Pancrustacea
- Class: Insecta
- Order: Lepidoptera
- Family: Pyralidae
- Genus: Acrobasis
- Species: A. ptilophanes

Binomial name
- Acrobasis ptilophanes Meyrick, 1929

Species of moth

Acrobasis ptilophanes is a species of snout moth in the genus Acrobasis. It was described by Edward Meyrick in 1929. It is found on the Society Islands.
