= Acrobasis caulivorella =

Scientific classification
- Kingdom: Animalia
- Phylum: Arthropoda
- Clade: Pancrustacea
- Class: Insecta
- Order: Lepidoptera
- Family: Pyralidae
- Genus: Acrobasis
- Species: A. caulivorella

Binomial name
- Acrobasis caulivorella Neunzig, 1986

Species of moth

Acrobasis caulivorella is a species of snout moth in the genus Acrobasis. It was described by Herbert H. Neunzig in 1986, and is known from Florida, United States.

The larvae feed on Carya illinoinensis.
