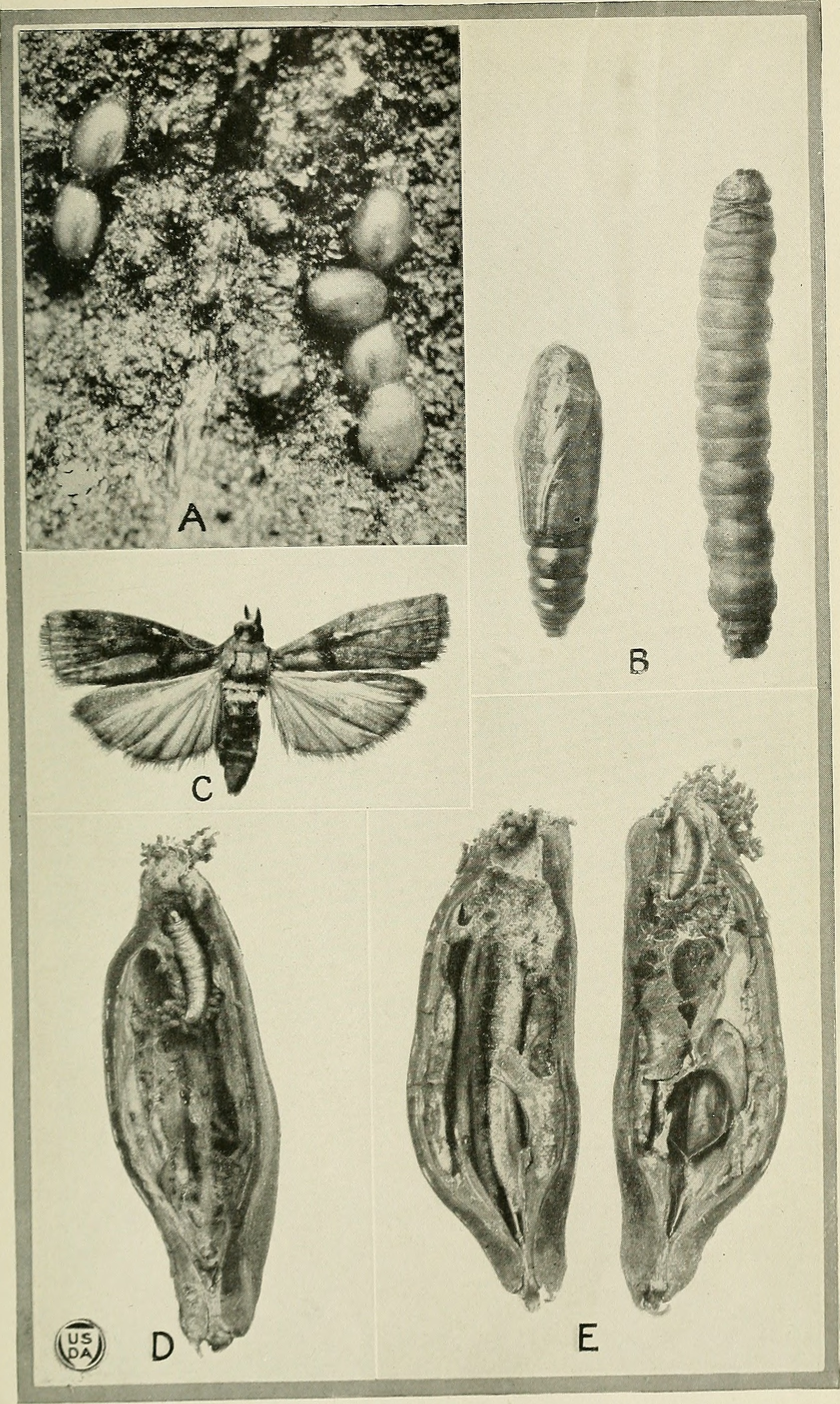

Scientific classification
- Kingdom: Animalia
- Phylum: Arthropoda
- Clade: Pancrustacea
- Class: Insecta
- Order: Lepidoptera
- Family: Pyralidae
- Genus: Acrobasis
- Species: A. betulella

Binomial name
- Acrobasis betulella Hulst, 1890

Synonyms
- Acrobasis hebescella Hulst, 1890

= Acrobasis betulella =

Species of moth

Acrobasis betulella, the birch tubemaker, is a species of snout moth in the genus Acrobasis. It was described by George Duryea Hulst in 1890, and is known from southeastern Canada and the United States.

There is one generation per year.

The larvae feed on Betula species, including Betula populifolia and Betula papyrifera. The species overwinters in the larval stage. Young larvae probably bore into unfolding buds. Older larvae draw several leaves together with silk and consume the margins of the leaves. Pupation takes place in a pupal chamber which is made at the end of the tube.
