= Acrobasis foroiuliensis =

Scientific classification
- Kingdom: Animalia
- Phylum: Arthropoda
- Clade: Pancrustacea
- Class: Insecta
- Order: Lepidoptera
- Family: Pyralidae
- Genus: Acrobasis
- Species: A. foroiuliensis

Binomial name
- Acrobasis foroiuliensis Huemer & Nuss, 2007

Species of moth

Acrobasis foroiuliensis is a species of snout moth in the genus Acrobasis. It was described by Peter Huemer and Matthias Nuss in 2007. It is found in Italy.
