= Acrobasis regina =

Scientific classification
- Kingdom: Animalia
- Phylum: Arthropoda
- Clade: Pancrustacea
- Class: Insecta
- Order: Lepidoptera
- Family: Pyralidae
- Genus: Acrobasis
- Species: A. regina

Binomial name
- Acrobasis regina Roesler & Küppers, 1981

Species of moth

Acrobasis regina is a species of snout moth in the genus Acrobasis. It was described by Roesler and Küppers, in 1981. It is found on Sumatra.
