= Conobathra tricolorella =

Scientific classification
- Kingdom: Animalia
- Phylum: Arthropoda
- Clade: Pancrustacea
- Class: Insecta
- Order: Lepidoptera
- Family: Pyralidae
- Genus: Acrobasis
- Species: A. tricolorella

Binomial name
- Acrobasis tricolorella (Inoue, 1982)

Synonyms
- Conobathra tricolorella Inoue, 1982

Species of moth

Acrobasis tricolorella is a species of snout moth in the genus Acrobasis. It was described by Hiroshi Inoue in 1982. It is found in Japan.

== Taxonomy ==
The species was first described as Conobathra tricolorella. When moved to Acrobasis, the name tricolorella was preoccupied by Acrobasis tricolorella, an unrelated North American species discovered in 1878. In 2012 Chinese lepidopterist Ying-Dang Ren proposed A. inouei as a replacement name.
