= Acrobasis aicha =

Scientific classification
- Kingdom: Animalia
- Phylum: Arthropoda
- Clade: Pancrustacea
- Class: Insecta
- Order: Lepidoptera
- Family: Pyralidae
- Genus: Acrobasis
- Species: A. aicha

Binomial name
- Acrobasis aicha Asselbergs, 1998

Species of moth

Acrobasis aicha is a species of snout moth in the genus Acrobasis. It was described by Jan Asselbergs in 1998 and is found in Morocco.
