= Acrobasis cantonella =

Scientific classification
- Kingdom: Animalia
- Phylum: Arthropoda
- Clade: Pancrustacea
- Class: Insecta
- Order: Lepidoptera
- Family: Pyralidae
- Genus: Acrobasis
- Species: A. cantonella

Binomial name
- Acrobasis cantonella (Caradja, 1925)

Synonyms
- Salebria cantonella Caradja, 1925; Salebria griseotincta Caradja, 1939

Species of moth

Acrobasis cantonella is a species of snout moth in the genus Acrobasis. It was described by Aristide Caradja in 1925. It is found in China.
