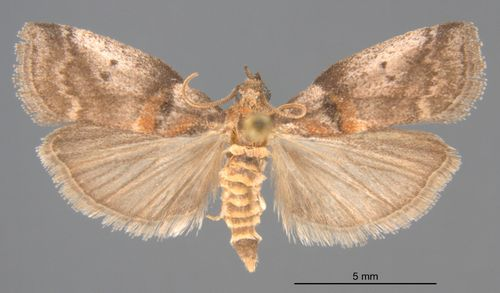

Scientific classification
- Kingdom: Animalia
- Phylum: Arthropoda
- Clade: Pancrustacea
- Class: Insecta
- Order: Lepidoptera
- Family: Pyralidae
- Genus: Acrobasis
- Species: A. kylesi

Binomial name
- Acrobasis kylesi Neunzig, 1986

= Acrobasis kylesi =

Species of moth

Acrobasis kylesi is a species of snout moth in the genus Acrobasis. It was described by Herbert H. Neunzig in 1986 and is known from Louisiana, United States.

The larvae feed on Ostrya virginiana.
