= Acrobasis xanthogramma =

Scientific classification
- Kingdom: Animalia
- Phylum: Arthropoda
- Clade: Pancrustacea
- Class: Insecta
- Order: Lepidoptera
- Family: Pyralidae
- Genus: Acrobasis
- Species: A. xanthogramma

Binomial name
- Acrobasis xanthogramma (Staudinger, 1870)

Synonyms
- Myelois xanthogramma Staudinger, 1870; Conobathra xanthogramma; Acrobasis pumilella Rebel, 1926; Acrobasis zizyphella Rebel, 1914; Eurhodope arenella Dufrane, 1955; Acrobasis xanthogramma jordanella Amsel, 1965

Species of moth

Acrobasis xanthogramma is a species of snout moth in the genus Acrobasis. It was described by Staudinger in 1870. It is endemic to Spain, North Africa and Jordan.
