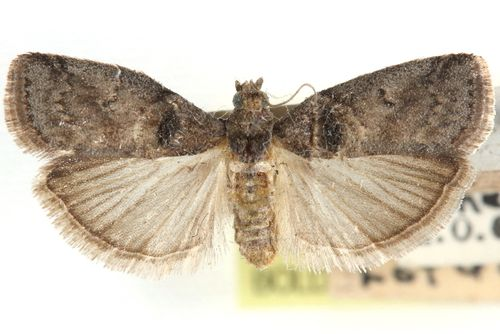

Scientific classification
- Kingdom: Animalia
- Phylum: Arthropoda
- Clade: Pancrustacea
- Class: Insecta
- Order: Lepidoptera
- Family: Pyralidae
- Genus: Acrobasis
- Species: A. coryliella

Binomial name
- Acrobasis coryliella Dyar, 1908

= Acrobasis coryliella =

Species of moth

Acrobasis coryliella is a species of snout moth in the genus Acrobasis. It was described by Harrison Gray Dyar Jr. in 1908, and is known from the eastern United States.

There is one generation per year.

The larvae feed on Corylus species.
