= Acrobasis atelogramma =

Scientific classification
- Kingdom: Animalia
- Phylum: Arthropoda
- Clade: Pancrustacea
- Class: Insecta
- Order: Lepidoptera
- Family: Pyralidae
- Genus: Acrobasis
- Species: A. atelogramma

Binomial name
- Acrobasis atelogramma (Meyrick, 1937)

Synonyms
- Myelois atelogramma Meyrick, 1937; Conobathra atelogramma

Species of moth

Acrobasis atelogramma is a species of snout moth in the genus Acrobasis. It was described by Edward Meyrick in 1937. It is found in India.
