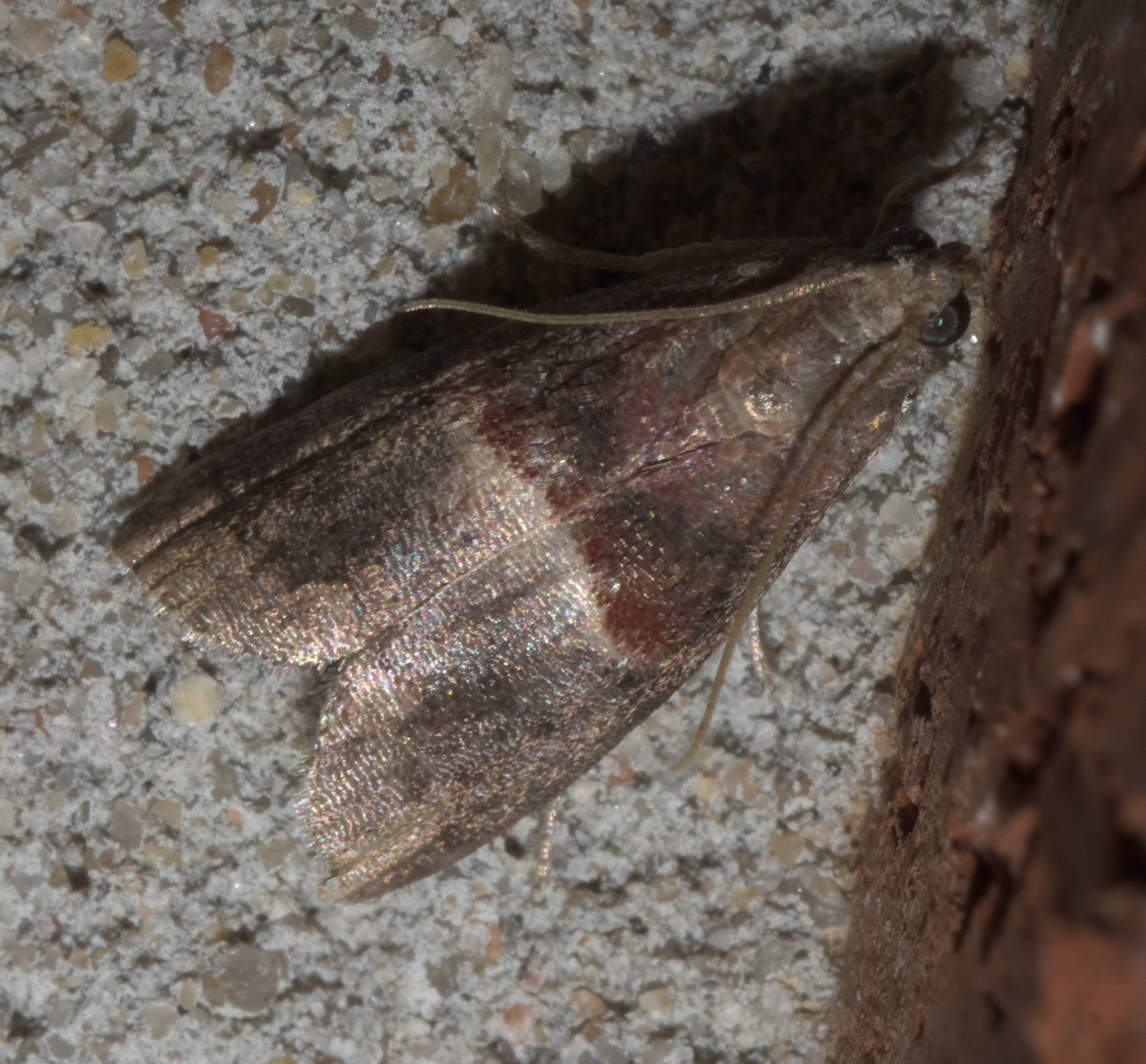

Scientific classification
- Kingdom: Animalia
- Phylum: Arthropoda
- Clade: Pancrustacea
- Class: Insecta
- Order: Lepidoptera
- Family: Pyralidae
- Genus: Acrobasis
- Species: A. exsulella

Binomial name
- Acrobasis exsulella (Zeller, 1848)

Synonyms
- Myelois exsulella Zeller, 1848; Acrobasis septentrionella Dyar, 1925; Acrobasis peplifera Dyar, 1925

= Acrobasis exsulella =

Species of moth

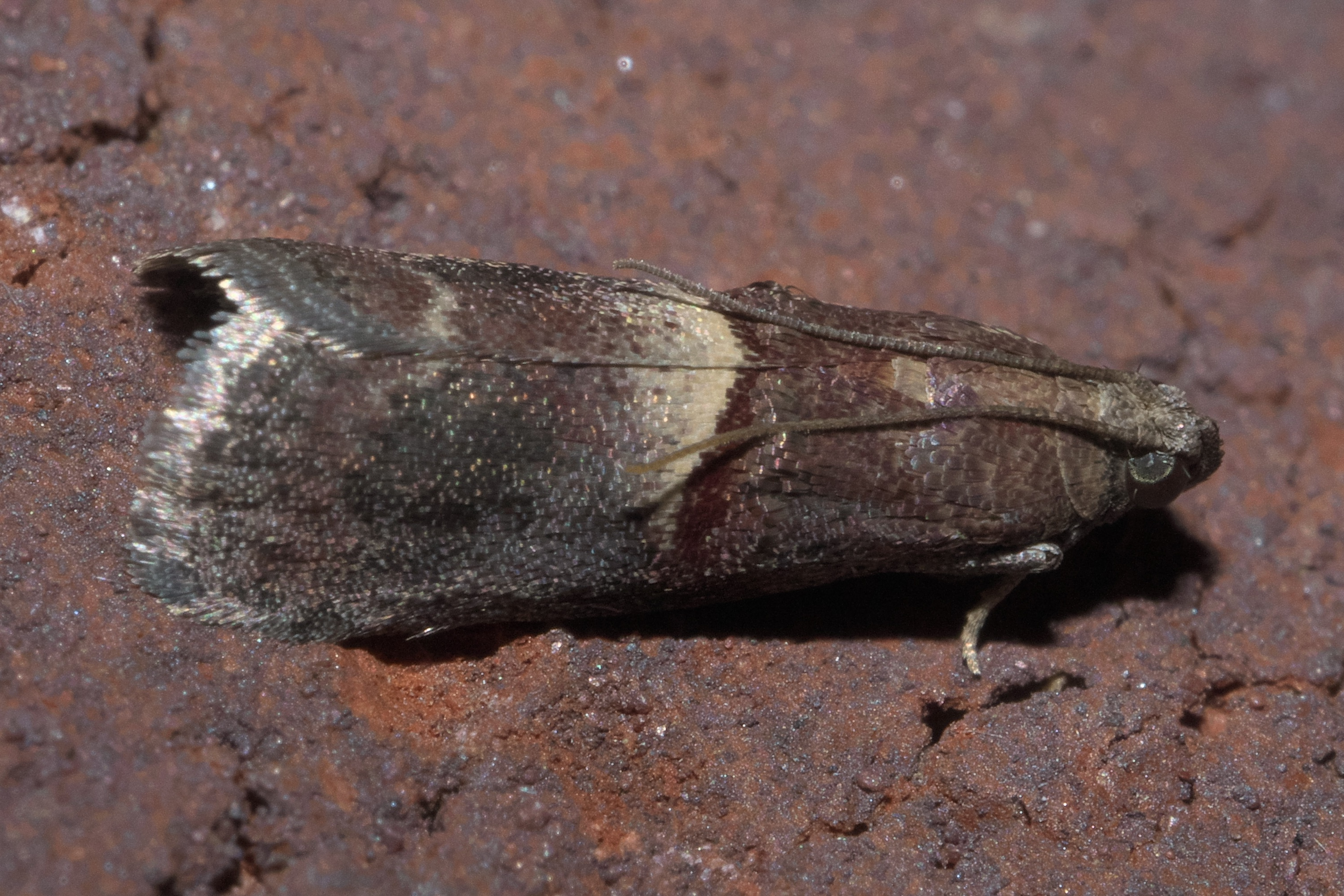
Acrobasis exsulella, cordovan pyralid, Size: 9 mm

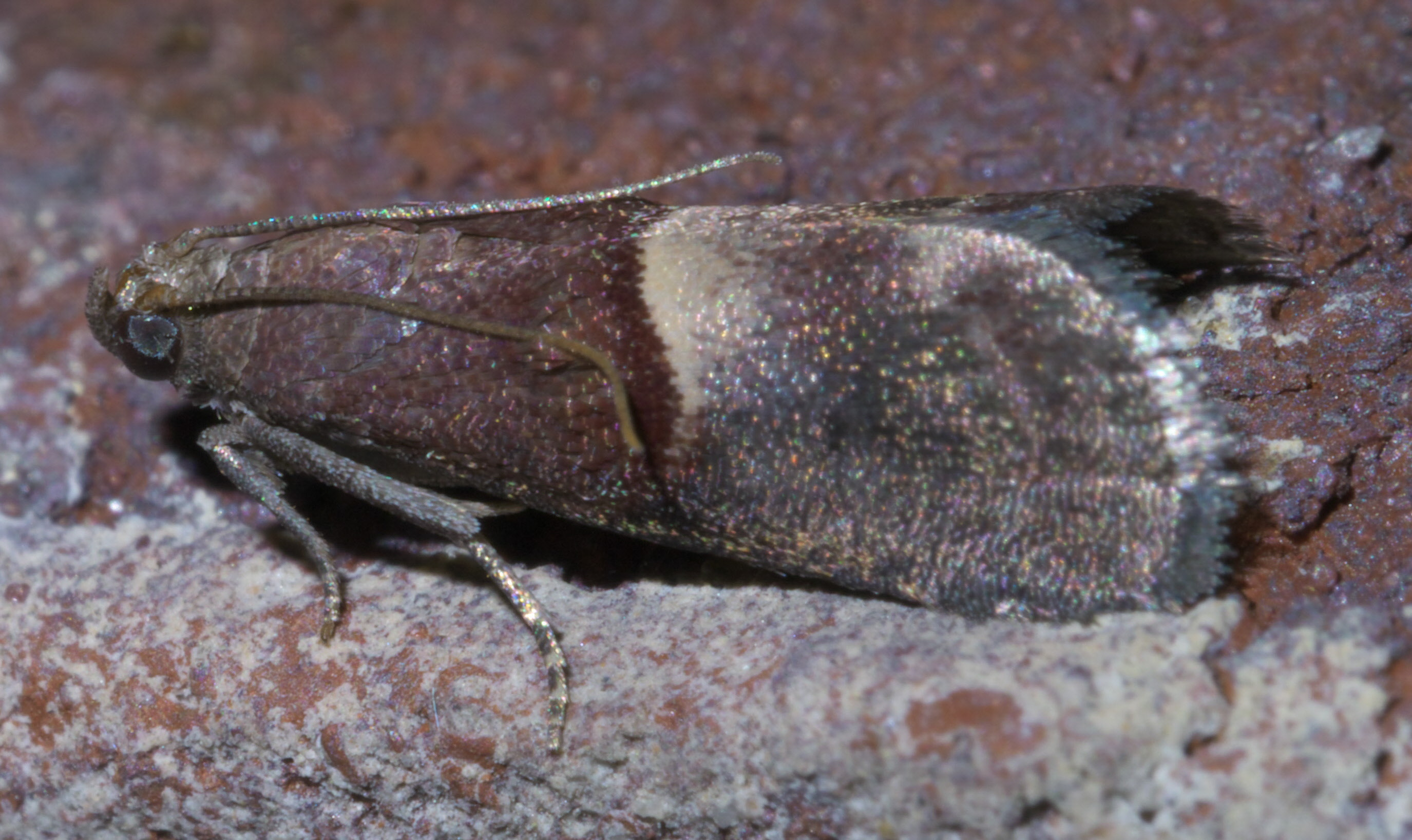
Acrobasis exsulella, cordovan pyralid

Acrobasis exsulella, the cordovan pyralid moth, is a species of snout moth in the genus Acrobasis. It was described by Philipp Christoph Zeller in 1848, and is known from the southeastern United States.
