= Acrobasis curvella =

Scientific classification
- Kingdom: Animalia
- Phylum: Arthropoda
- Clade: Pancrustacea
- Class: Insecta
- Order: Lepidoptera
- Family: Pyralidae
- Genus: Acrobasis
- Species: A. curvella

Binomial name
- Acrobasis curvella (Ragonot, 1893)

Synonyms
- Rhodophaea curvella Ragonot, 1893

Species of moth

Acrobasis curvella is a species of snout moth in the genus Acrobasis. It was described by Émile Louis Ragonot in 1893. It is found in Amur, Russia.
