= Acrobasis hemichlaena =

Scientific classification
- Kingdom: Animalia
- Phylum: Arthropoda
- Clade: Pancrustacea
- Class: Insecta
- Order: Lepidoptera
- Family: Pyralidae
- Genus: Acrobasis
- Species: A. hemichlaena

Binomial name
- Acrobasis hemichlaena (Meyrick, 1887)

Synonyms
- Pempelia hemichlaena Meyrick, 1887; Conobathra hemichlaena

Species of moth

Acrobasis hemichlaena is a species of snout moth in the genus Acrobasis. It was described by Edward Meyrick in 1887. It is found in Australia.
