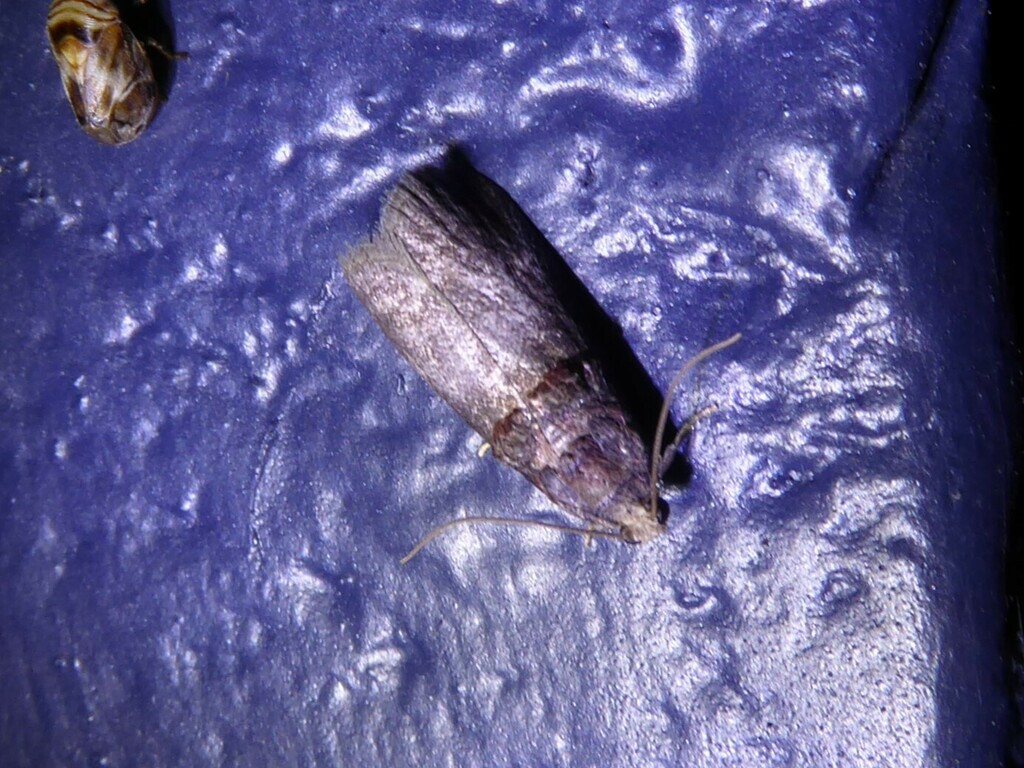

Scientific classification
- Kingdom: Animalia
- Phylum: Arthropoda
- Clade: Pancrustacea
- Class: Insecta
- Order: Lepidoptera
- Family: Pyralidae
- Genus: Acrobasis
- Species: A. cunulae

Binomial name
- Acrobasis cunulae Dyar & Heinrich, 1929

= Acrobasis cunulae =

Species of moth

Acrobasis cunulae is a species of snout moth in the genus Acrobasis. It was described by Harrison Gray Dyar Jr. and Heinrich, in 1929, and is known from Ontario, Canada, and eastern United States.

There is one generation per year.

The larvae feed on Carya species, including Carya illinoinensis. Late stage larvae feed on the terminal leaflets of their host plant. They pull together the three most external leaflets with silk. They then construct a tube of frass and silk which is attached to the underside of the midrib of the central leaflet. They then feed on the three leaflets. Pupation takes place in a pupal chamber which is constructed at the end of the tube.
