= Acrobasis khachella =

Scientific classification
- Kingdom: Animalia
- Phylum: Arthropoda
- Clade: Pancrustacea
- Class: Insecta
- Order: Lepidoptera
- Family: Pyralidae
- Genus: Acrobasis
- Species: A. khachella

Binomial name
- Acrobasis khachella (Amsel, 1950)

Synonyms
- Rhodophaea khachella Amsel, 1950

Species of moth

Acrobasis khachella is a species of snout moth in the genus Acrobasis. It was described by Hans Georg Amsel in 1950. It is found in Iran.
