= Acrobasis flavifasciella =

Scientific classification
- Kingdom: Animalia
- Phylum: Arthropoda
- Clade: Pancrustacea
- Class: Insecta
- Order: Lepidoptera
- Family: Pyralidae
- Genus: Acrobasis
- Species: A. flavifasciella

Binomial name
- Acrobasis flavifasciella Yamanaka, 1990

Species of moth

Acrobasis flavifasciella is a species of snout moth in the genus Acrobasis. It was described by Hiroshi Yamanaka in 1990. It is found in Japan.
