= Acrobasis obrutella =

Scientific classification
- Kingdom: Animalia
- Phylum: Arthropoda
- Clade: Pancrustacea
- Class: Insecta
- Order: Lepidoptera
- Family: Pyralidae
- Genus: Acrobasis
- Species: A. obrutella

Binomial name
- Acrobasis obrutella (Christoph, 1881)

Synonyms
- Myelois obrutella Christoph, 1881; Myelois rufofusellus Caradja, 1931; Rhodophaea bellulella Ragonot, 1893

Species of moth

Acrobasis obrutella is a species of snout moth in the genus Acrobasis. It was described by Hugo Theodor Christoph in 1881. It is found in China and Japan.
