= Acrobasis hemiargyralis =

Scientific classification
- Kingdom: Animalia
- Phylum: Arthropoda
- Clade: Pancrustacea
- Class: Insecta
- Order: Lepidoptera
- Family: Pyralidae
- Genus: Acrobasis
- Species: A. hemiargyralis

Binomial name
- Acrobasis hemiargyralis (Hampson, 1908)

Synonyms
- Nephopteryx hemiargyralis Hampson, 1908

Species of moth

Acrobasis hemiargyralis is a species of snout moth in the genus Acrobasis. It was described by George Hampson in 1908. It is found in India.
