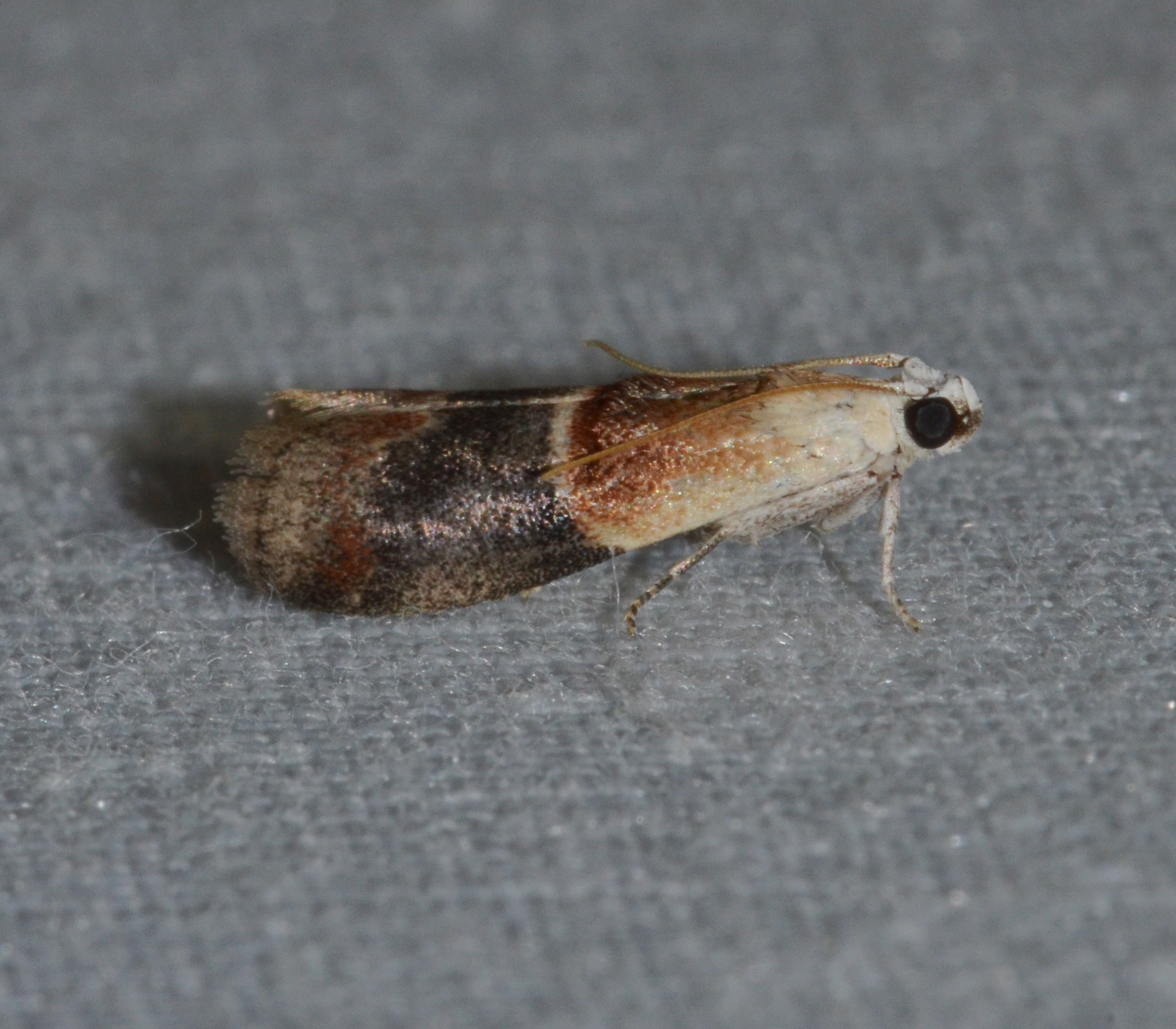
- Adult
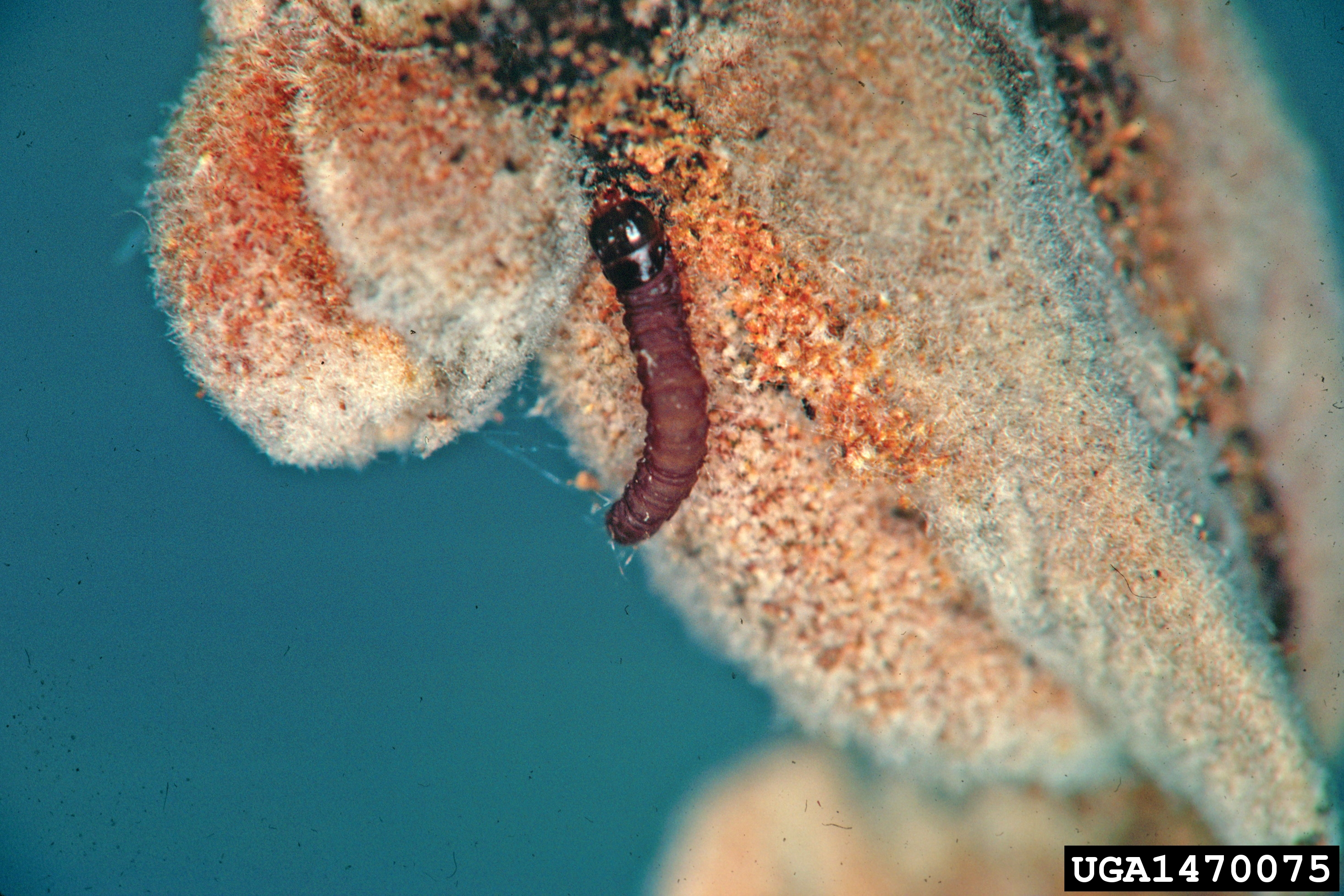
- Larva

Scientific classification
- Kingdom: Animalia
- Phylum: Arthropoda
- Clade: Pancrustacea
- Class: Insecta
- Order: Lepidoptera
- Family: Pyralidae
- Genus: Acrobasis
- Species: A. demotella

Binomial name
- Acrobasis demotella Grote, 1881

= Acrobasis demotella =

Species of moth

Acrobasis demotella, the walnut shoot moth, is a moth of the family Pyralidae described by Augustus Radcliffe Grote in 1881. It is found in North America, from Ontario south to North Carolina and west to Missouri and Michigan.

The wingspan is 20–24 mm.

The larva feeds on Juglans species, Carya illinoinensis and other Carya species.
