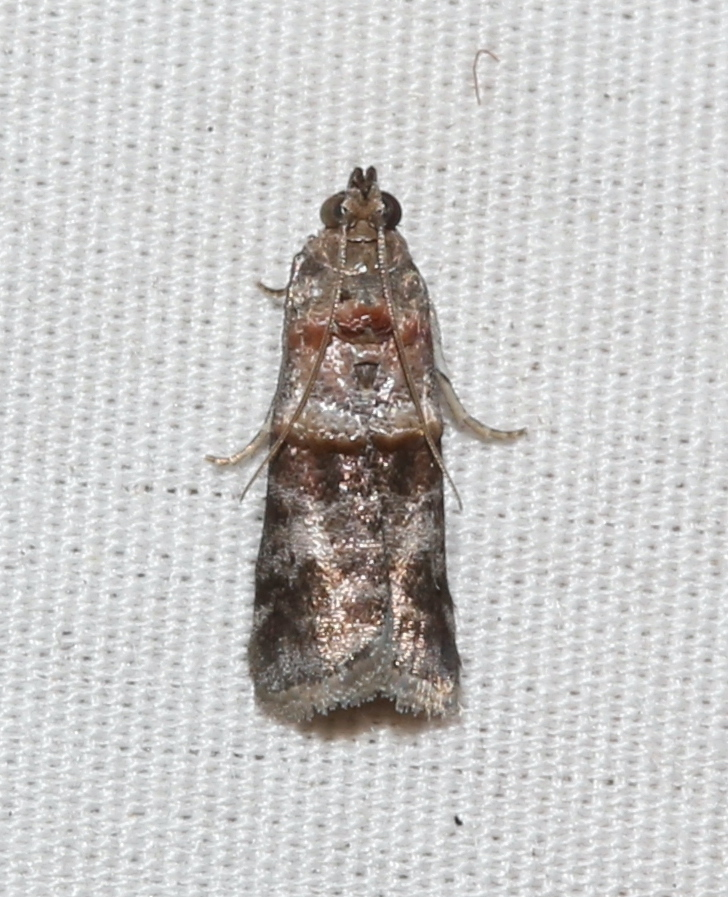

Scientific classification
- Kingdom: Animalia
- Phylum: Arthropoda
- Clade: Pancrustacea
- Class: Insecta
- Order: Lepidoptera
- Family: Pyralidae
- Genus: Acrobasis
- Species: A. aurorella

Binomial name
- Acrobasis aurorella Ely, 1910

= Acrobasis aurorella =

Species of moth

Acrobasis aurorella is a species of snout moth in the genus Acrobasis. It was described by Charles Russell Ely in 1910, and is known from the eastern United States.
