= Acrobasis baharaca =

Scientific classification
- Kingdom: Animalia
- Phylum: Arthropoda
- Clade: Pancrustacea
- Class: Insecta
- Order: Lepidoptera
- Family: Pyralidae
- Genus: Acrobasis
- Species: A. baharaca

Binomial name
- Acrobasis baharaca (Roesler, 1987)

Synonyms
- Trachycera baharaca Roesler, 1987

Species of moth

Acrobasis baharaca is a species of snout moth in the genus Acrobasis. It was described by Roesler in 1987. It is found in Afghanistan.
