= Acrobasis nigribasalis =

Scientific classification
- Kingdom: Animalia
- Phylum: Arthropoda
- Clade: Pancrustacea
- Class: Insecta
- Order: Lepidoptera
- Family: Pyralidae
- Genus: Acrobasis
- Species: A. nigribasalis

Binomial name
- Acrobasis nigribasalis Amsel, 1954

Species of moth

Acrobasis nigribasalis is a species of snout moth in the genus Acrobasis. It is found in Iran.
