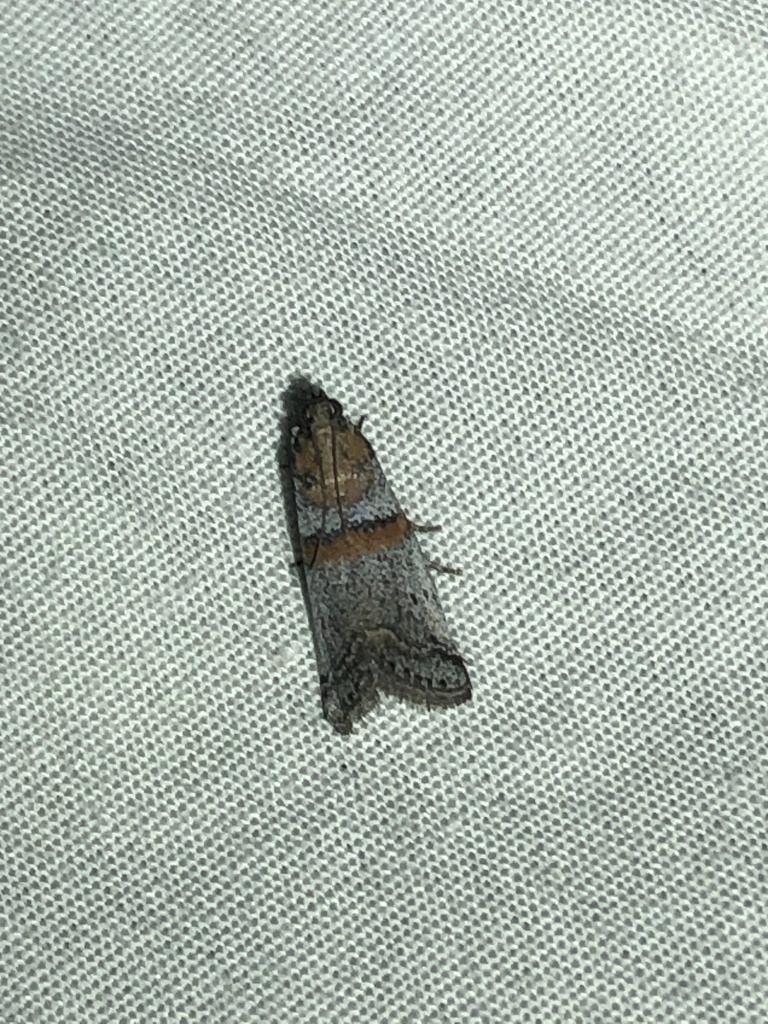

Scientific classification
- Kingdom: Animalia
- Phylum: Arthropoda
- Clade: Pancrustacea
- Class: Insecta
- Order: Lepidoptera
- Family: Pyralidae
- Genus: Acrobasis
- Species: A. pallicornella

Binomial name
- Acrobasis pallicornella (Ragonot, 1887)

Synonyms
- Rhodophaea pallicornella Ragonot, 1887; Trachycera pallicornella

= Acrobasis pallicornella =

Species of moth

Acrobasis pallicornella is a species of snout moth in the genus Acrobasis. It was described by Ragonot in 1887. It is found in Texas.
