= Acrobasis minorella =

Scientific classification
- Kingdom: Animalia
- Phylum: Arthropoda
- Clade: Pancrustacea
- Class: Insecta
- Order: Lepidoptera
- Family: Pyralidae
- Genus: Acrobasis
- Species: A. minorella

Binomial name
- Acrobasis minorella (Caradja, 1910)

Synonyms
- Ephestia minorella Caradja, 1910; Rhodophaea minorella

Species of moth

Acrobasis minorella is a species of snout moth in the genus Acrobasis. It was described by Aristide Caradja in 1910. It is found in Algeria.
