= Acrobasis olivalis =

Scientific classification
- Kingdom: Animalia
- Phylum: Arthropoda
- Clade: Pancrustacea
- Class: Insecta
- Order: Lepidoptera
- Family: Pyralidae
- Genus: Acrobasis
- Species: A. olivalis

Binomial name
- Acrobasis olivalis (Hampson, 1896)

Synonyms
- Phycita olivalis Hampson, 1896

Species of moth

Acrobasis olivalis is a species of snout moth in the genus Acrobasis. It was described by George Hampson in 1896, and is known from Australia.
