= Acrobasis fallouella =

Scientific classification
- Kingdom: Animalia
- Phylum: Arthropoda
- Clade: Pancrustacea
- Class: Insecta
- Order: Lepidoptera
- Family: Pyralidae
- Genus: Acrobasis
- Species: A. fallouella

Binomial name
- Acrobasis fallouella (Ragonot, 1871)

Synonyms
- Myelois fallouella Ragonot, 1871

Species of moth

Acrobasis fallouella is a species of snout moth in the genus Acrobasis. It was described by Ragonot in 1871. It is found in France.
