= Acrobasis ereboscopa =

Scientific classification
- Kingdom: Animalia
- Phylum: Arthropoda
- Clade: Pancrustacea
- Class: Insecta
- Order: Lepidoptera
- Family: Pyralidae
- Genus: Acrobasis
- Species: A. ereboscopa

Binomial name
- Acrobasis ereboscopa (Lower, 1903)

Synonyms
- Nephopteryx ereboscopa Lower, 1903

Species of moth

Acrobasis ereboscopa is a species of snout moth in the genus Acrobasis. It was described by Oswald Bertram Lower in 1903, and is known from Australia.
