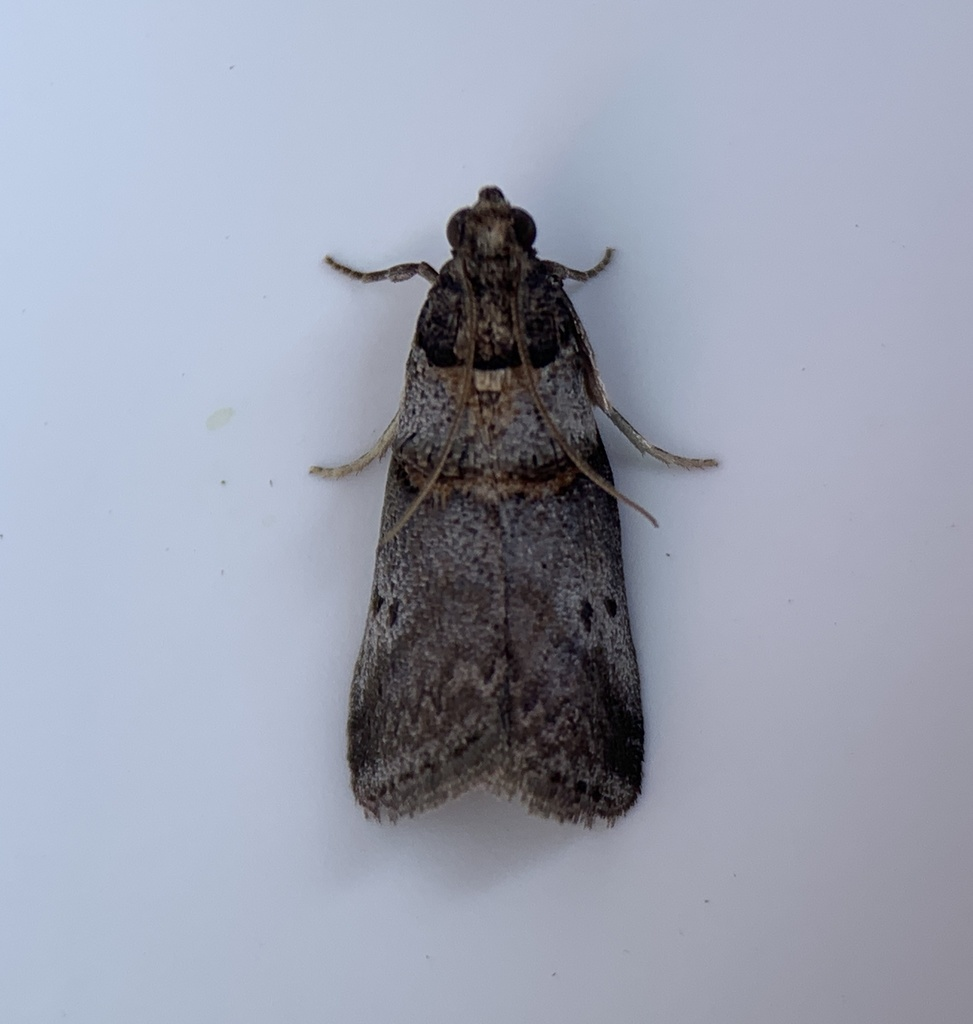

Scientific classification
- Kingdom: Animalia
- Phylum: Arthropoda
- Clade: Pancrustacea
- Class: Insecta
- Order: Lepidoptera
- Family: Pyralidae
- Genus: Acrobasis
- Species: A. sylviella

Binomial name
- Acrobasis sylviella Ely, 1908

= Acrobasis sylviella =

Species of moth

Acrobasis sylviella, the ironwood tubemaker moth, is a species of snout moth in the genus Acrobasis. It was described by Charles Russell Ely in 1908 and is known from eastern Canada and the United States.
