= Acrobasis izuensis =

Scientific classification
- Kingdom: Animalia
- Phylum: Arthropoda
- Clade: Pancrustacea
- Class: Insecta
- Order: Lepidoptera
- Family: Pyralidae
- Genus: Acrobasis
- Species: A. izuensis

Binomial name
- Acrobasis izuensis Yamanaka, 2004

Species of moth

Acrobasis izuensis is a species of snout moth in the genus Acrobasis. It was described by Hiroshi Yamanaka in 2004. It is found in Japan.
