= Acrobasis niveicinctella =

Scientific classification
- Kingdom: Animalia
- Phylum: Arthropoda
- Clade: Pancrustacea
- Class: Insecta
- Order: Lepidoptera
- Family: Pyralidae
- Genus: Acrobasis
- Species: A. niveicinctella

Binomial name
- Acrobasis niveicinctella (Ragonot, 1887)

Synonyms
- Rhodophaea niveinctella Ragonot, 1887; Rhodophaea iranalis Amsel, 1950

Species of moth

Acrobasis niveicinctella is a species of snout moth in the genus Acrobasis. It was described by Ragonot in 1887. It is found in Russia and Turkmenistan.
