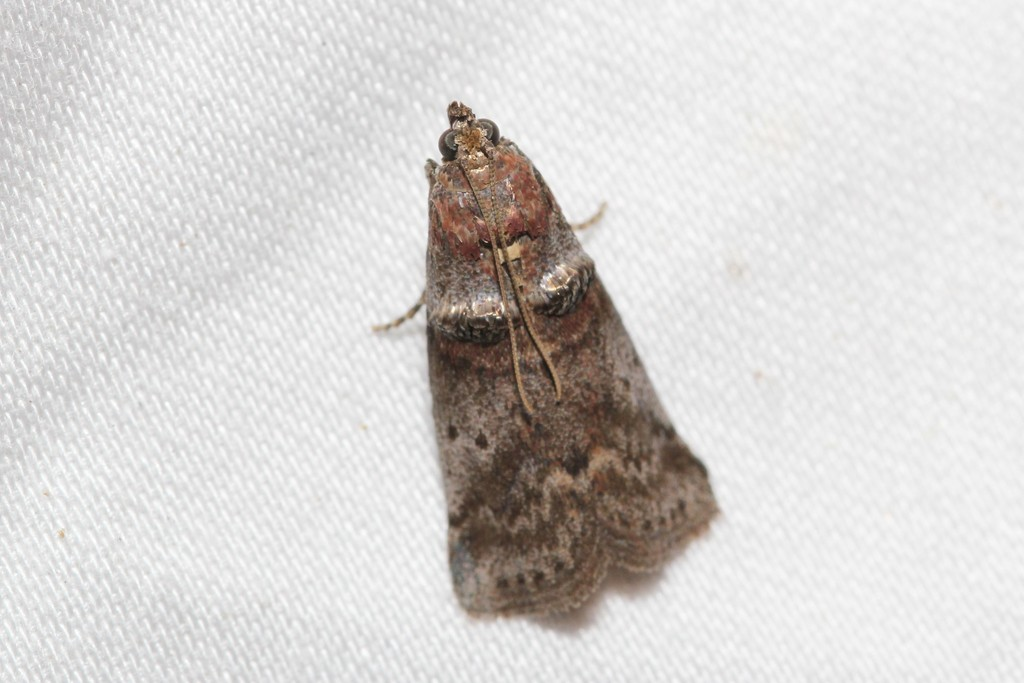

Scientific classification
- Kingdom: Animalia
- Phylum: Arthropoda
- Clade: Pancrustacea
- Class: Insecta
- Order: Lepidoptera
- Family: Pyralidae
- Genus: Acrobasis
- Species: A. comptoniella

Binomial name
- Acrobasis comptoniella Hulst, 1890

= Acrobasis comptoniella =

Species of moth

Acrobasis comptoniella, the sweetfern leaf casebearer or sweet-fern moth, is a species of snout moth in the subfamily Phycitinae. It was described by George Duryea Hulst in 1890 and is known from eastern Canada and the United States.

The wingspan is about 22 mm (0.87 in). There is one generation per year.

The larvae feed on Comptonia peregrina.
