= Acrobasis zyziphella =

Scientific classification
- Kingdom: Animalia
- Phylum: Arthropoda
- Clade: Pancrustacea
- Class: Insecta
- Order: Lepidoptera
- Family: Pyralidae
- Genus: Acrobasis
- Species: A. zyziphella

Binomial name
- Acrobasis zyziphella Rebel, 1914

Species of moth

Acrobasis zyziphella is a species of snout moth in the genus Acrobasis. It was described by Rebel in 1914. It is found in Egypt.
