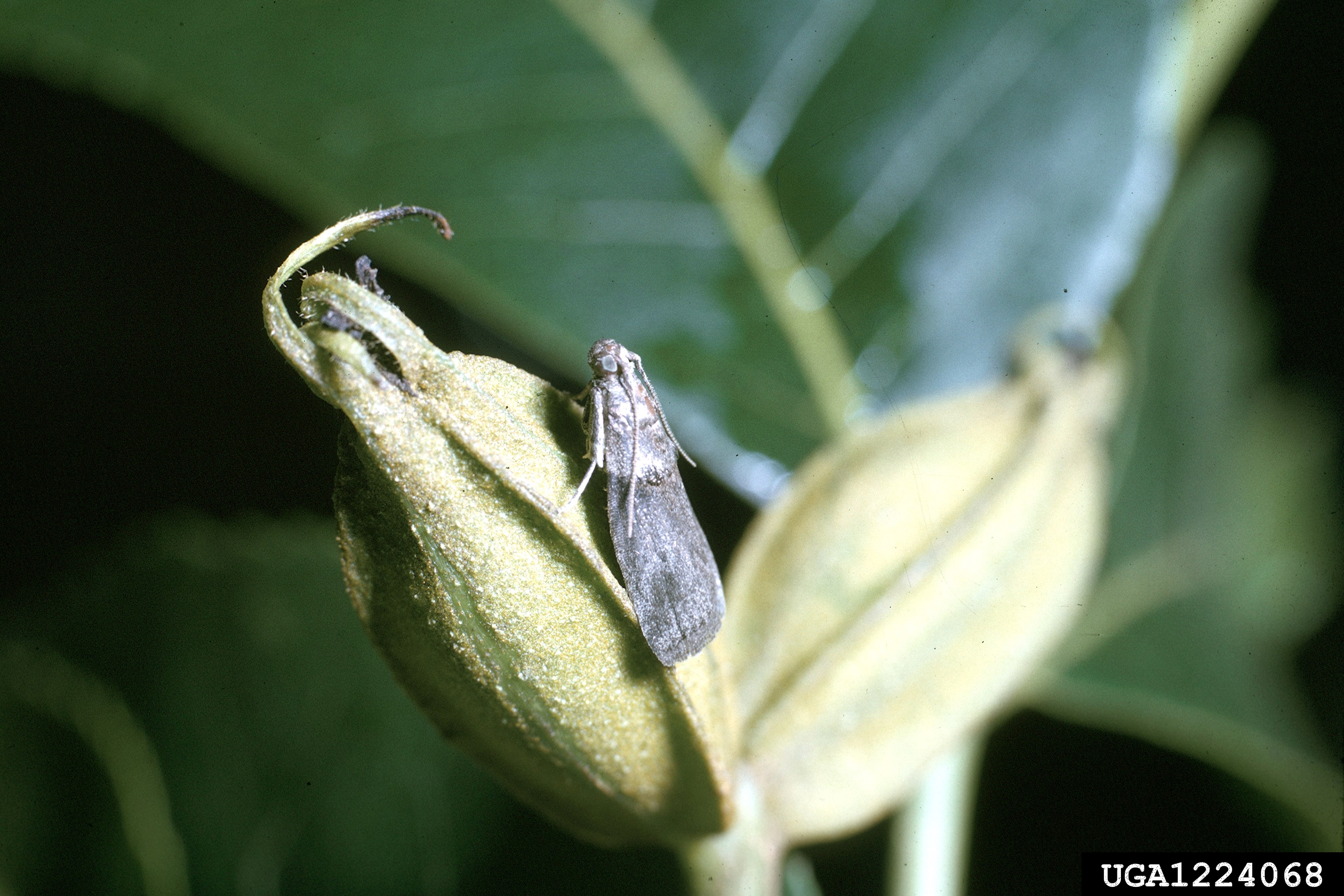

Scientific classification
- Kingdom: Animalia
- Phylum: Arthropoda
- Clade: Pancrustacea
- Class: Insecta
- Order: Lepidoptera
- Family: Pyralidae
- Genus: Acrobasis
- Species: A. nuxvorella

Binomial name
- Acrobasis nuxvorella Neunzig, 1970

= Acrobasis nuxvorella =

Species of moth

Acrobasis nuxvorella, the pecan nut casebearer, is a moth of the family Pyralidae described by Herbert H. Neunzig in 1970. It is found in the United States in eastern New Mexico, Texas, Oklahoma, Louisiana, Missouri, southern Illinois, Mississippi, Alabama, Florida, Georgia, South Carolina and North Carolina.

The larvae feed on Carya illinoinensis.
