= Acrobasis juglanivorella =

Scientific classification
- Kingdom: Animalia
- Phylum: Arthropoda
- Clade: Pancrustacea
- Class: Insecta
- Order: Lepidoptera
- Family: Pyralidae
- Genus: Acrobasis
- Species: A. juglanivorella

Binomial name
- Acrobasis juglanivorella Neunzig, 1986

Species of moth

Acrobasis juglanivorella is a species of snout moth in the genus Acrobasis. It was described by Herbert H. Neunzig in 1986, and is known from Wisconsin, United States.

The larvae feed on Juglans nigra. They mine the buds of their host plant shortly after bud break in spring. They cause further damage by mining out new shoots.
