= Acrobasis atrisquamella =

Scientific classification
- Kingdom: Animalia
- Phylum: Arthropoda
- Clade: Pancrustacea
- Class: Insecta
- Order: Lepidoptera
- Family: Pyralidae
- Genus: Acrobasis
- Species: A. atrisquamella

Binomial name
- Acrobasis atrisquamella Ragonot, 1887

Synonyms
- Acrobasis nigrisquamella Amsel, 1954

Species of moth

Acrobasis atrisquamella is a species of snout moth in the genus Acrobasis. It was described by Émile Louis Ragonot in 1887, and is known from Asia Minor, Israel and Iran.
