= Acrobasis erastriella =

Scientific classification
- Kingdom: Animalia
- Phylum: Arthropoda
- Clade: Pancrustacea
- Class: Insecta
- Order: Lepidoptera
- Family: Pyralidae
- Genus: Acrobasis
- Species: A. erastriella

Binomial name
- Acrobasis erastriella (Ragonot, 1887)

Synonyms
- Rhodophaea erastriella Ragonot, 1887; Rhodophaea lella Chrétien, 1911; Rhodophaea semistrigella Mabille, 1908

Species of moth

Acrobasis erastriella is a species of snout moth in the genus Acrobasis. It was described by Émile Louis Ragonot in 1887. It is found in Azerbaijan.
