= Acrobasis corethropus =

Scientific classification
- Kingdom: Animalia
- Phylum: Arthropoda
- Clade: Pancrustacea
- Class: Insecta
- Order: Lepidoptera
- Family: Pyralidae
- Genus: Acrobasis
- Species: A. corethropus

Binomial name
- Acrobasis corethropus (Turner, 1904)

Synonyms
- Phycita corethropus Turner, 1904; Conobathra corethropus

Species of moth

Acrobasis corethropus is a species of snout moth in the genus Acrobasis. It was described by Turner in 1904. It is found in Australia.
