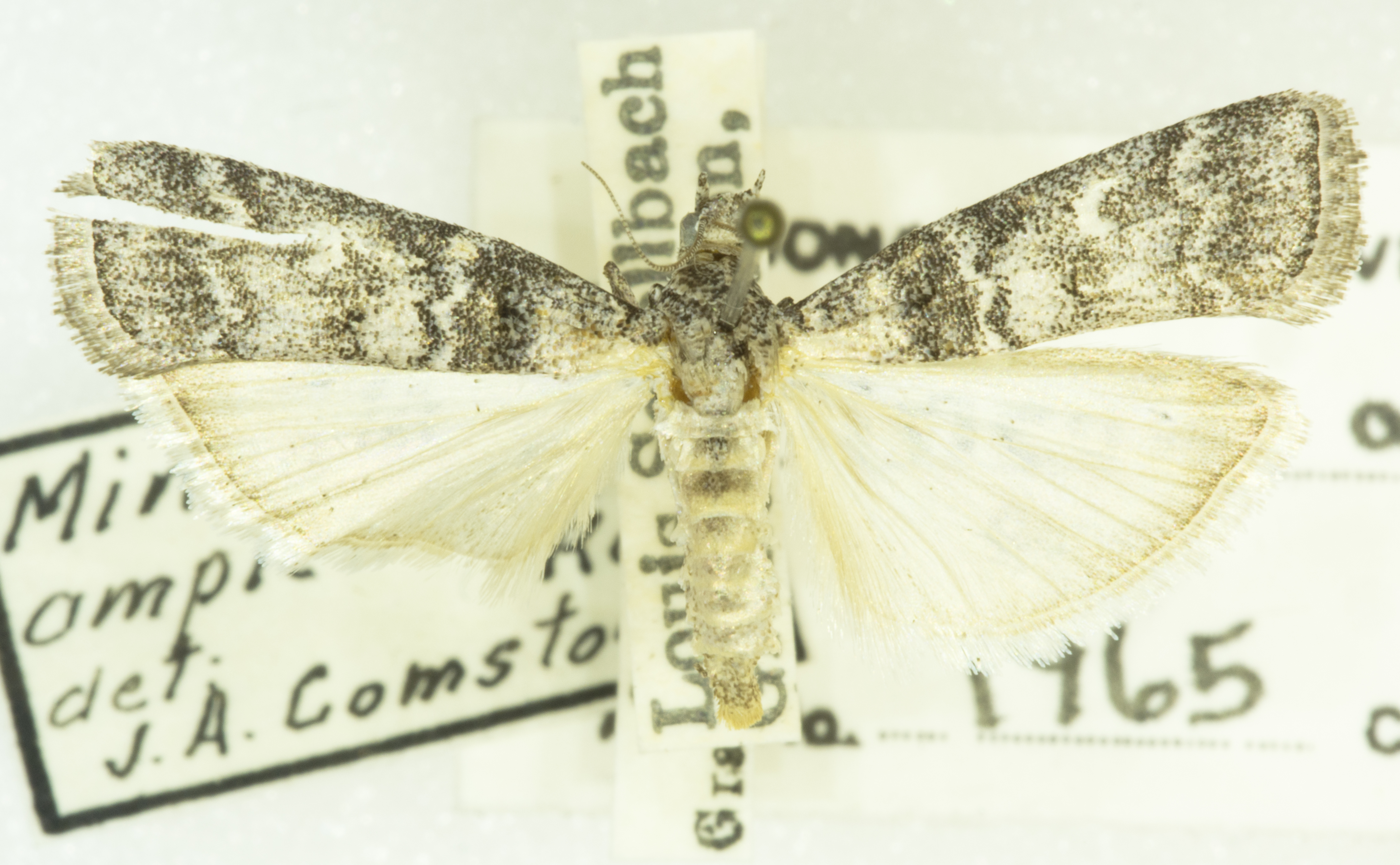

Scientific classification
- Kingdom: Animalia
- Phylum: Arthropoda
- Clade: Pancrustacea
- Class: Insecta
- Order: Lepidoptera
- Family: Pyralidae
- Genus: Acrobasis
- Species: A. amplexella

Binomial name
- Acrobasis amplexella Ragonot, 1887

= Acrobasis amplexella =

Species of moth

Acrobasis amplexella is a species of snout moth in the genus Acrobasis. It was described by Ragonot in 1887, and is known from eastern Canada and the United States.

The larvae feed on laurel species, including Kalmia angustifolia and Kalmia latifolia.
