= Acrobasis craterantis =

Scientific classification
- Kingdom: Animalia
- Phylum: Arthropoda
- Clade: Pancrustacea
- Class: Insecta
- Order: Lepidoptera
- Family: Pyralidae
- Genus: Acrobasis
- Species: A. craterantis

Binomial name
- Acrobasis craterantis (Meyrick, 1933)

Synonyms
- Hylopylora craterantis Meyrick, 1933

Species of moth

Acrobasis craterantis is a species of snout moth in the genus Acrobasis. It was described by Edward Meyrick in 1933. It is found in the Congo Basin.
