= Acrobasis klimeschi =

Scientific classification
- Kingdom: Animalia
- Phylum: Arthropoda
- Clade: Pancrustacea
- Class: Insecta
- Order: Lepidoptera
- Family: Pyralidae
- Genus: Acrobasis
- Species: A. klimeschi

Binomial name
- Acrobasis klimeschi Roesler, 1978

Species of moth

Acrobasis klimeschi is a species of snout moth in the genus Acrobasis. It was described by Roesler, in 1978. It is found on the Canary Islands.
