= Acrobasis persicella =

Scientific classification
- Kingdom: Animalia
- Phylum: Arthropoda
- Clade: Pancrustacea
- Class: Insecta
- Order: Lepidoptera
- Family: Pyralidae
- Genus: Acrobasis
- Species: A. persicella

Binomial name
- Acrobasis persicella (Amsel, 1951)

Synonyms
- Rhodophaea persicella Amsel, 1951; Acrobasis persicella pagmanalis Amsel, 1961

Species of moth

Acrobasis persicella is a species of snout moth in the genus Acrobasis. It was described by Hans Georg Amsel in 1951. It is found in Iran.
