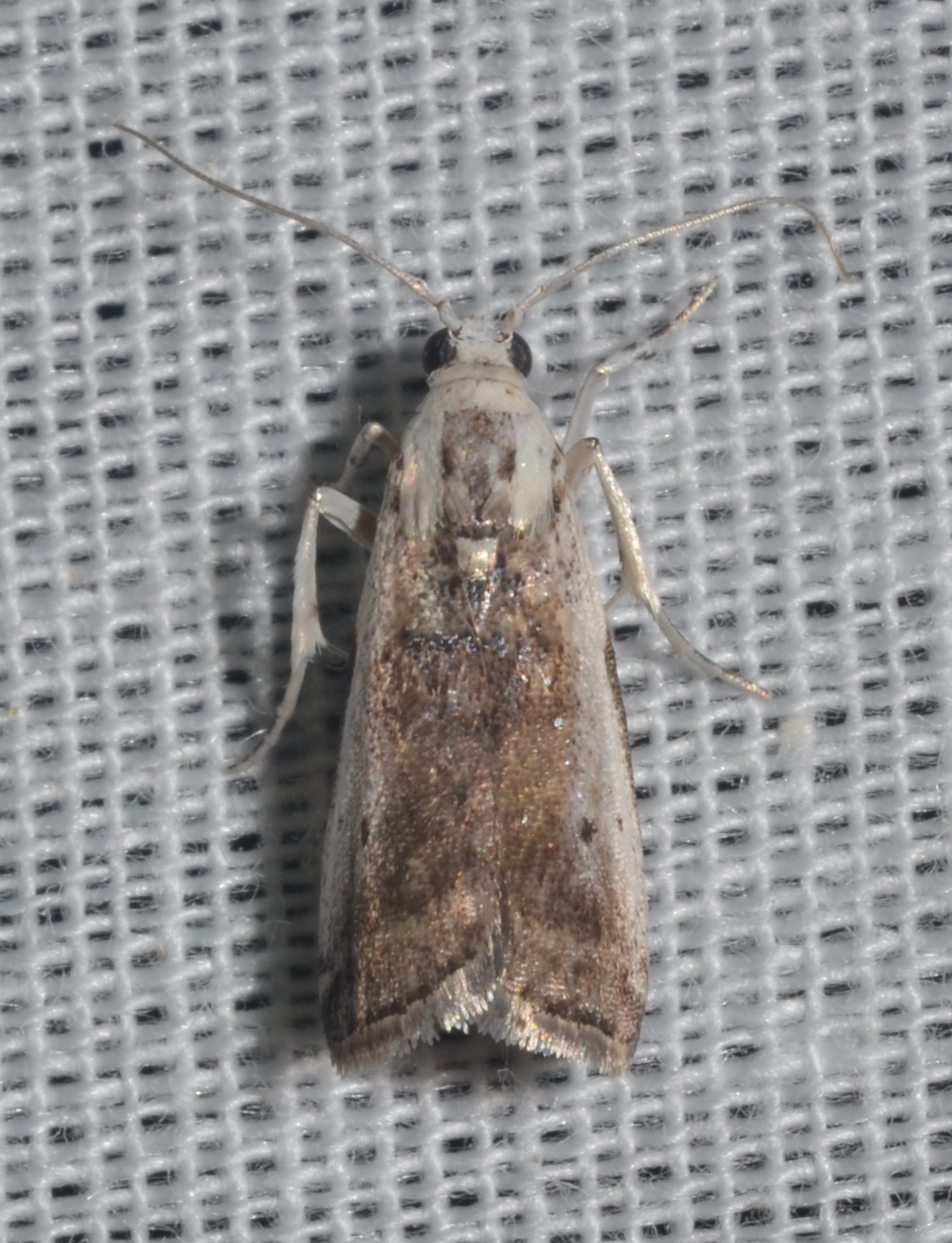

Scientific classification
- Kingdom: Animalia
- Phylum: Arthropoda
- Clade: Pancrustacea
- Class: Insecta
- Order: Lepidoptera
- Family: Pyralidae
- Genus: Acrobasis
- Species: A. caryivorella

Binomial name
- Acrobasis caryivorella Ragonot, 1887

Synonyms
- Cateremna tumidulella Ragonot, 1887; Acrocaula comacornella Hulst, 1900

= Acrobasis caryivorella =

Pecan nursery casemaker

Species of moth

Acrobasis caryivorella, the pecan nursery casemaker, is a species of snout moth in the genus Acrobasis. It was described by Émile Louis Ragonot in 1887, and is known from southeastern Ontario, Canada, and the eastern United States.

There are two to four generations per year.

The larvae feed on Carya and Juglans species. Larvae of the first generation bore into the new growth of their host plant. The species overwinters in the larval stage. Larvae of the following generation hollow out the interior of the nut and pupate within.
