= Acrobasis yakushimensis =

Scientific classification
- Kingdom: Animalia
- Phylum: Arthropoda
- Clade: Pancrustacea
- Class: Insecta
- Order: Lepidoptera
- Family: Pyralidae
- Genus: Acrobasis
- Species: A. yakushimensis

Binomial name
- Acrobasis yakushimensis (Yamanaka, 2000)

Synonyms
- Trachycera yakushimensis Yamanaka, 2000

Species of moth

Acrobasis yakushimensis is a species of snout moth in the genus Acrobasis. It was described by Hiroshi Yamanaka in 2000. It is found in Japan.
