= Acrobasis minutalis =

Scientific classification
- Kingdom: Animalia
- Phylum: Arthropoda
- Clade: Pancrustacea
- Class: Insecta
- Order: Lepidoptera
- Family: Pyralidae
- Genus: Acrobasis
- Species: A. minutalis

Binomial name
- Acrobasis minutalis Asselbergs, 2008

Species of moth

Acrobasis minutalis is a species of snout moth in the genus Acrobasis. It was described by Jan Asselbergs in 2008 and is found in the United Arab Emirates.
