= Acrobasis ottomana =

Scientific classification
- Kingdom: Animalia
- Phylum: Arthropoda
- Clade: Pancrustacea
- Class: Insecta
- Order: Lepidoptera
- Family: Pyralidae
- Genus: Acrobasis
- Species: A. ottomana

Binomial name
- Acrobasis ottomana Caradja, 1916

Species of moth

Acrobasis ottomana is a species of snout moth in the subfamily Phycitinae. It was described by Aristide Caradja in 1916. It is found in Israel.

== Taxonomy ==
Acrobasis ottomana is also listed as a synonym of Acrobasis obtusella.
