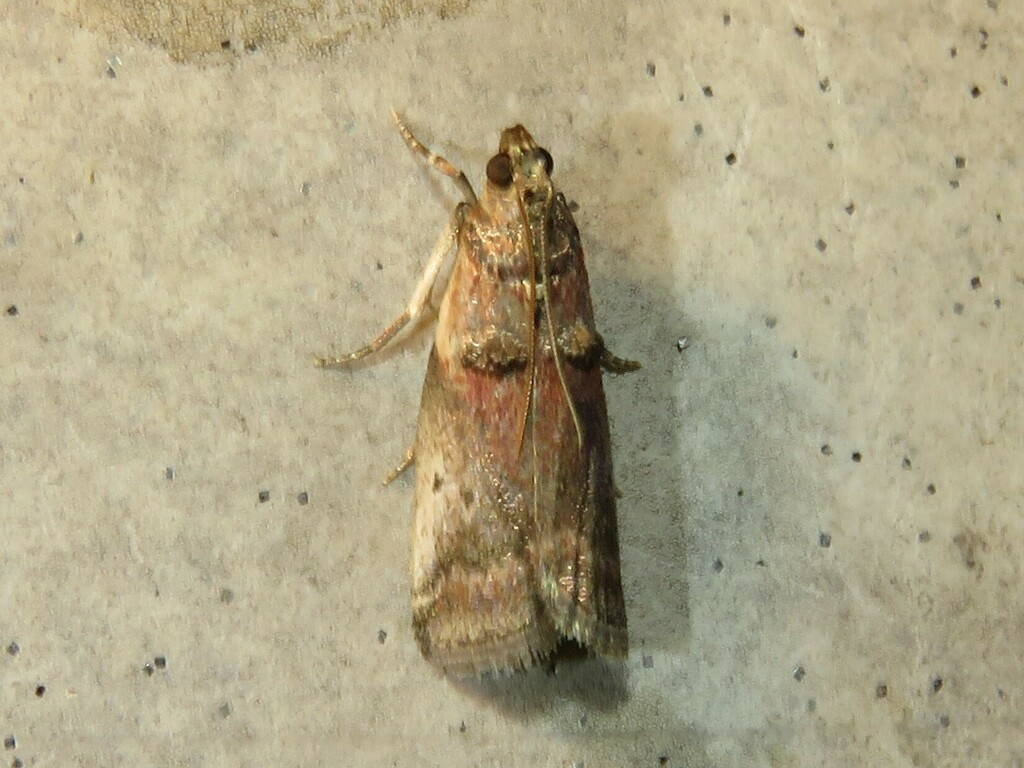

Scientific classification
- Kingdom: Animalia
- Phylum: Arthropoda
- Clade: Pancrustacea
- Class: Insecta
- Order: Lepidoptera
- Family: Pyralidae
- Genus: Acrobasis
- Species: A. ostryella

Binomial name
- Acrobasis ostryella Ely, 1913

= Acrobasis ostryella =

Species of moth

Acrobasis ostryella is a species of snout moth in the genus Acrobasis. It was described by Charles Russell Ely in 1913 and is known from Ontario in Canada and the eastern United States. There is one generation per year.

The larvae feed on Ostrya virginiana. The species overwinters in the larval stage. After overwintering, young larvae feed on the undersurface of the base of a leaf. A tube is constructed and several nearby leaves are pulled together around the tube. The larvae usually leave this tube to construct a second one. Pupation takes place in a pupal chamber which is made at the end of the tube.
