= Acrobasis subceltifoliella =

Scientific classification
- Kingdom: Animalia
- Phylum: Arthropoda
- Clade: Pancrustacea
- Class: Insecta
- Order: Lepidoptera
- Family: Pyralidae
- Genus: Acrobasis
- Species: A. subceltifoliella

Binomial name
- Acrobasis subceltifoliella Yamanaka, 2006

Species of moth

Acrobasis subceltifoliella is a species of snout moth in the genus Acrobasis. It was described by Hiroshi Yamanaka in 2006 and is endemic to Japan.
