= Acrobasis praefectella =

Scientific classification
- Kingdom: Animalia
- Phylum: Arthropoda
- Clade: Pancrustacea
- Class: Insecta
- Order: Lepidoptera
- Family: Pyralidae
- Genus: Acrobasis
- Species: A. praefectella

Binomial name
- Acrobasis praefectella (Zerny, 1936)

Synonyms
- Rhodophaea praefectella Zerny, 1936; Rhodophaea chirazella Amsel, 1951

Species of moth

Acrobasis praefectella is a species of snout moth in the genus Acrobasis. It was described by Zerny in 1936. It is found in Morocco.
