= Acrobasis caribbeana =

Scientific classification
- Kingdom: Animalia
- Phylum: Arthropoda
- Clade: Pancrustacea
- Class: Insecta
- Order: Lepidoptera
- Family: Pyralidae
- Genus: Acrobasis
- Species: A. caribbeana

Binomial name
- Acrobasis caribbeana J. C. Shaffer, 1978

Species of moth

Acrobasis caribbeana is a species of snout moth in the genus Acrobasis. It was described by Jay C. Shaffer in 1978. It is found on Dominica.
