= Acrobasis vinaceellum =

Scientific classification
- Kingdom: Animalia
- Phylum: Arthropoda
- Clade: Pancrustacea
- Class: Insecta
- Order: Lepidoptera
- Family: Pyralidae
- Genus: Acrobasis
- Species: A. vinaceellum

Binomial name
- Acrobasis vinaceellum (Ragonot, 1901)

Synonyms
- Hyphantidium vinaceellum Ragonot, 1901

Species of moth

Acrobasis vinaceellum is a species of snout moth in the genus Acrobasis. It was described by Ragonot in 1901. It is found in Syria.
