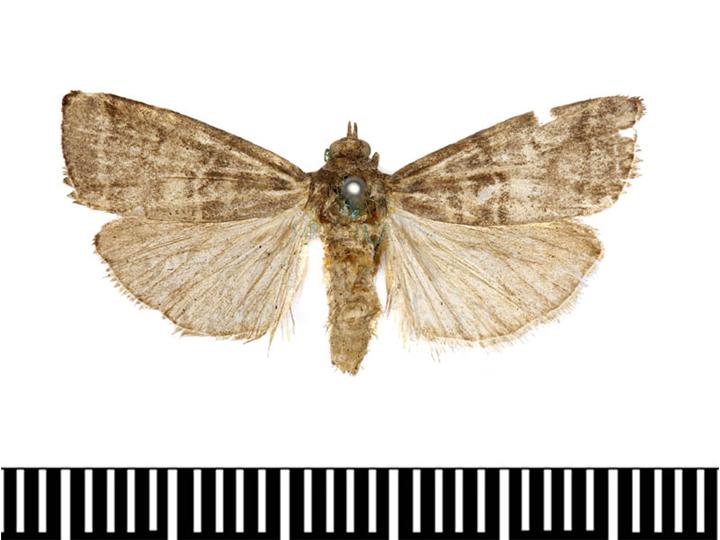

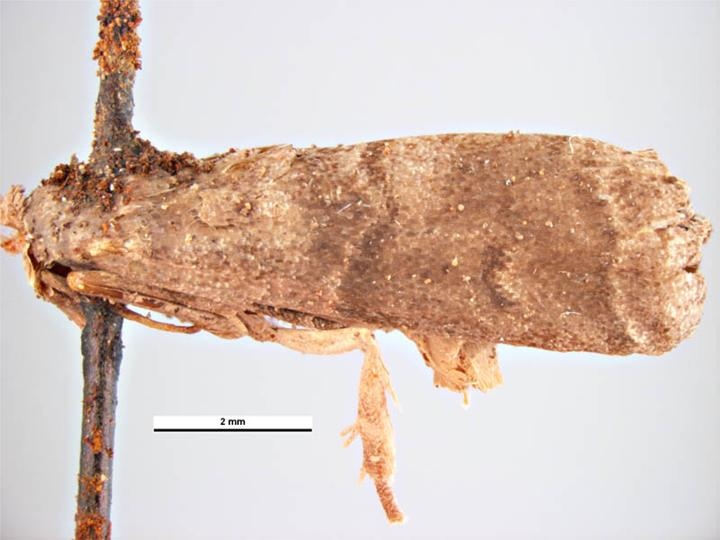

Scientific classification
- Kingdom: Animalia
- Phylum: Arthropoda
- Clade: Pancrustacea
- Class: Insecta
- Order: Lepidoptera
- Family: Pyralidae
- Genus: Acrobasis
- Species: A. pirivorella

Binomial name
- Acrobasis pirivorella (Matsumura, 1900)

Synonyms
- Acrobasis pyrivorella; Eurhodope pirivorella; Rhodophaea pirivorella; Ectomyelois pyrivorella (Matsumura, 1899); Numonia pirivorella (Matsumura, 1900); Nephopteryx pirivorella Matsumura, 1900; Nephopteryx pauperculella Wileman, 1911; Numonia pyrivora Gerasimov, 1926

= Acrobasis pirivorella =

Species of moth

Acrobasis pyrivorella, the pear fruit moth, pear moth or pear pyralid, is a moth of the family Pyralidae. It is native to the temperate zone of eastern Asia, where it is widely distributed. It has been recorded from northern China, the Korean Peninsula, Japan, Taiwan and Russia (Primor'ye and Khabarovskii provinces).

The wingspan is 14.5–21.5 mm. In Russia, adults are on wing from mid July to mid-August and again in September. The first generation adults bore into the bud and go into hibernation.
