= Acrobasis celticola =

Scientific classification
- Kingdom: Animalia
- Phylum: Arthropoda
- Clade: Pancrustacea
- Class: Insecta
- Order: Lepidoptera
- Family: Pyralidae
- Genus: Acrobasis
- Species: A. celticola

Binomial name
- Acrobasis celticola Staudinger, 1879

Species of moth

Acrobasis celticola is a species of snout moth in the genus Acrobasis. It was described by Staudinger, 1879. It is found in Asia Minor.
