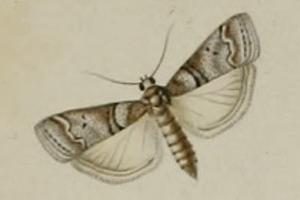

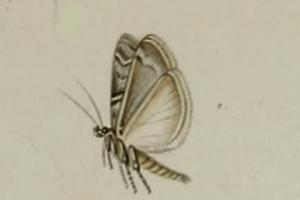

Scientific classification
- Kingdom: Animalia
- Phylum: Arthropoda
- Clade: Pancrustacea
- Class: Insecta
- Order: Lepidoptera
- Family: Pyralidae
- Genus: Acrobasis
- Species: A. romanella

Binomial name
- Acrobasis romanella (Millière, 1870)

Synonyms
- Rhodophaea romanella Millière, 1870; Acrobasis predotai Hartig, 1941; Acrobasis singularis Staudinger, 1876; Phycita omanella guilhemella D. Lucas, 1909; Acrobasis predotai Hartig, 1941; Eurhodope guelbenella Rungs, 1979; Acrobasis quilhemella D. Lucas, 1909

= Acrobasis romanella =

Species of moth

Acrobasis romanella is a species of snout moth in the genus Acrobasis. It was described by Pierre Millière, in 1870. It is found in France, Spain, Portugal and Italy.

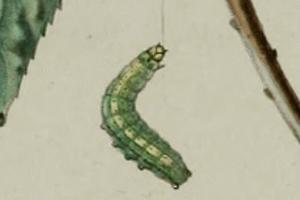
