= Acrobasis injunctella =

Scientific classification
- Kingdom: Animalia
- Phylum: Arthropoda
- Clade: Pancrustacea
- Class: Insecta
- Order: Lepidoptera
- Family: Pyralidae
- Genus: Acrobasis
- Species: A. injunctella

Binomial name
- Acrobasis injunctella (Christoph, 1881)

Synonyms
- Myelois injunctella Christoph, 1881; Salebria yuennanella Caradja in Caradja & Meyrick, 1937

Species of moth

Acrobasis injunctella is a species of snout moth in the genus Acrobasis. It was described by Hugo Theodor Christoph in 1881. It is found in Russia and China.
