= Acrobasis subflavella =

Scientific classification
- Kingdom: Animalia
- Phylum: Arthropoda
- Clade: Pancrustacea
- Class: Insecta
- Order: Lepidoptera
- Family: Pyralidae
- Genus: Acrobasis
- Species: A. subflavella

Binomial name
- Acrobasis subflavella (Inoue, 1982)

Synonyms
- Conobathra subflavella Inoue, 1982

Species of moth

Acrobasis subflavella is a species of snout moth in the genus Acrobasis. It was described by Hiroshi Inoue in 1982. It is found in Japan.
