= Acrobasis canella =

Scientific classification
- Kingdom: Animalia
- Phylum: Arthropoda
- Clade: Pancrustacea
- Class: Insecta
- Order: Lepidoptera
- Family: Pyralidae
- Genus: Acrobasis
- Species: A. canella

Binomial name
- Acrobasis canella Yamanaka, 2003

Species of moth

Acrobasis canella is a species of snout moth in the genus Acrobasis. It was described by Hiroshi Yamanaka in 2003. It is found in Japan.
