= Acrobasis ferruginella =

Scientific classification
- Kingdom: Animalia
- Phylum: Arthropoda
- Clade: Pancrustacea
- Class: Insecta
- Order: Lepidoptera
- Family: Pyralidae
- Genus: Acrobasis
- Species: A. ferruginella

Binomial name
- Acrobasis ferruginella Wileman, 1911

Synonyms
- Acrobasis ferruginella var. decolorata Caradja, 1938

Species of moth

Acrobasis ferruginella is a species of snout moth in the genus Acrobasis. It was described by Alfred Ernest Wileman in 1911. It is found in China.
