= Acrobasis mirabiella =

Scientific classification
- Kingdom: Animalia
- Phylum: Arthropoda
- Clade: Pancrustacea
- Class: Insecta
- Order: Lepidoptera
- Family: Pyralidae
- Genus: Acrobasis
- Species: A. mirabiella

Binomial name
- Acrobasis mirabiella (Toll, 1948)

Synonyms
- Anoristia mirabiella Toll, 1948; Rhodophaea senganella Amsel, 1950

Species of moth

Acrobasis mirabiella is a species of snout moth in the genus Acrobasis. It was described by Sergiusz Graf von Toll in 1948. It is found in Iran.
