= Acrobasis frankella =

Scientific classification
- Kingdom: Animalia
- Phylum: Arthropoda
- Clade: Pancrustacea
- Class: Insecta
- Order: Lepidoptera
- Family: Pyralidae
- Genus: Acrobasis
- Species: A. frankella

Binomial name
- Acrobasis frankella (Roesler, 1975)

Synonyms
- Conobathra frankella Roesler, 1975

Species of moth

Acrobasis frankella is a species of snout moth in the genus Acrobasis. It was described by Roesler in 1975. It is found in China.
