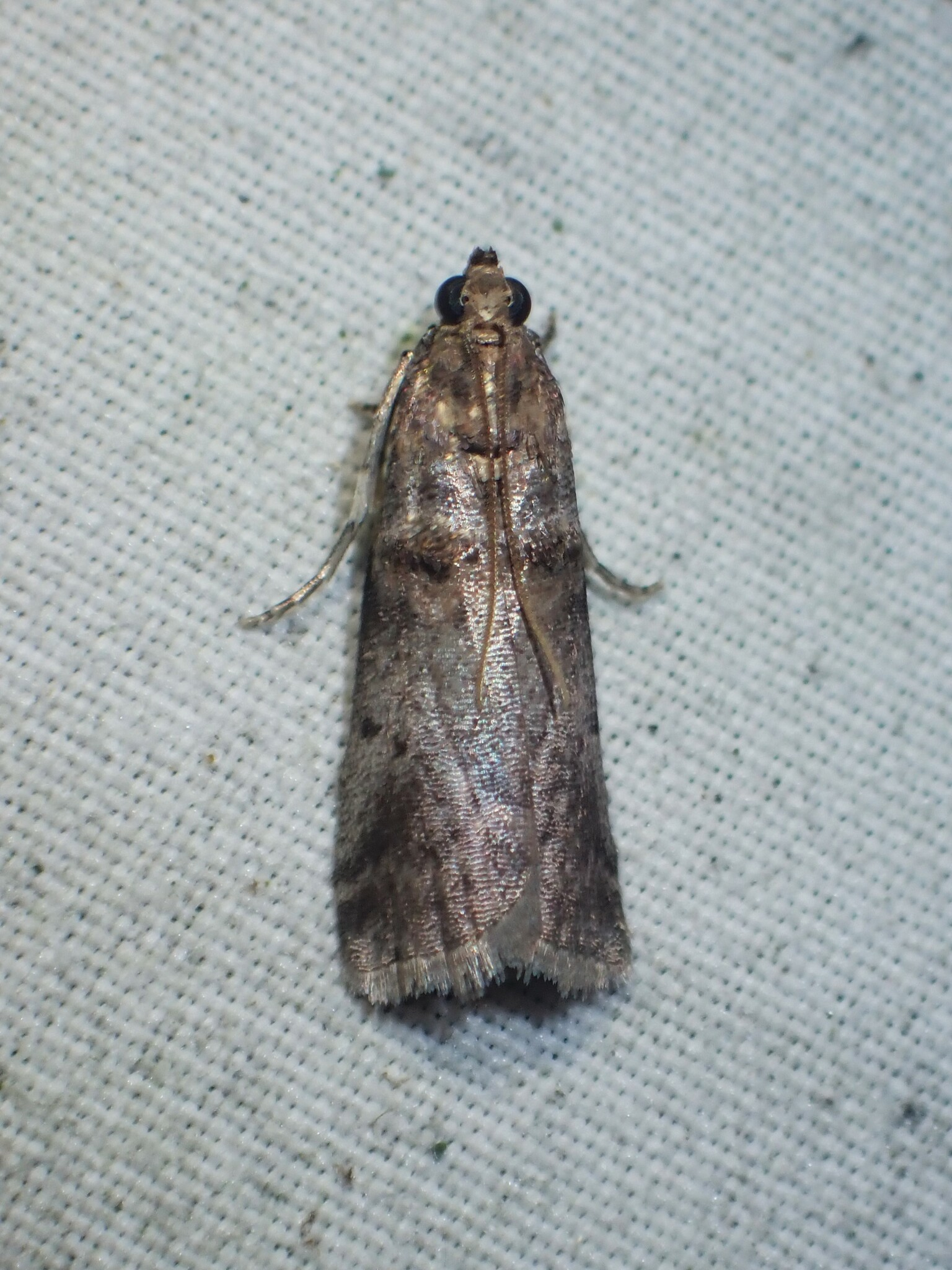

Scientific classification
- Kingdom: Animalia
- Phylum: Arthropoda
- Clade: Pancrustacea
- Class: Insecta
- Order: Lepidoptera
- Family: Pyralidae
- Genus: Acrobasis
- Species: A. rubrifasciella

Binomial name
- Acrobasis rubrifasciella Packard, 1874

Synonyms
- Acrobasis alnella McDunnough, 1922; Acrobasis dyarella Ely, 1910

= Acrobasis rubrifasciella =

Species of moth

Acrobasis rubrifasciella, the alder tubemaker moth, is a species of snout moth in the genus Acrobasis. It was described by Alpheus Spring Packard in 1874, and is known from central-eastern Canada and eastern United States.

The larvae feed on Alnus species, including Alnus serrulata and Alnus rugosa. Young larvae feed on wintered leaf-buds of their host plant.
