= Acrobasis rufilimbalis =

Scientific classification
- Kingdom: Animalia
- Phylum: Arthropoda
- Clade: Pancrustacea
- Class: Insecta
- Order: Lepidoptera
- Family: Pyralidae
- Genus: Acrobasis
- Species: A. rufilimbalis

Binomial name
- Acrobasis rufilimbalis (Wileman, 1911)

Synonyms
- Rhodophaea rufilimbalis Wileman, 1911

Species of moth

Acrobasis rufilimbalis is a species of snout moth in the genus Acrobasis. It was described by Wileman in 1911. It is found in Japan.

The wingspan is 15–18 mm.
