= Acrobasis automorpha =

Scientific classification
- Kingdom: Animalia
- Phylum: Arthropoda
- Clade: Pancrustacea
- Class: Insecta
- Order: Lepidoptera
- Family: Pyralidae
- Genus: Acrobasis
- Species: A. automorpha

Binomial name
- Acrobasis automorpha (Meyrick, 1886)

Synonyms
- Conobathra automorpha Meyrick, 1886

Species of moth

Acrobasis automorpha is a species of snout moth in the genus Acrobasis. It was described by Edward Meyrick in 1886. It is found on New Guinea.
