= Acrobasis mienshani =

Scientific classification
- Kingdom: Animalia
- Phylum: Arthropoda
- Clade: Pancrustacea
- Class: Insecta
- Order: Lepidoptera
- Family: Pyralidae
- Genus: Acrobasis
- Species: A. mienshani

Binomial name
- Acrobasis mienshani Caradja, 1939

Species of moth

Acrobasis mienshani is a species of snout moth in the genus Acrobasis. It was described by Aristide Caradja in 1939. It is found in China.
