= Acrobasis bifidella =

Scientific classification
- Kingdom: Animalia
- Phylum: Arthropoda
- Clade: Pancrustacea
- Class: Insecta
- Order: Lepidoptera
- Family: Pyralidae
- Genus: Acrobasis
- Species: A. bifidella

Binomial name
- Acrobasis bifidella (Leech, 1889)

Synonyms
- Melitene bifidella Leech, 1889; Acrobasis sarcothorax Meyrick, 1937

Species of moth

Acrobasis bifidella is a species of snout moth in the genus Acrobasis. It was described by John Henry Leech in 1889. It is found in China, Japan and Korea.
