= Acrobasis encaustella =

Scientific classification
- Kingdom: Animalia
- Phylum: Arthropoda
- Clade: Pancrustacea
- Class: Insecta
- Order: Lepidoptera
- Family: Pyralidae
- Genus: Acrobasis
- Species: A. encaustella

Binomial name
- Acrobasis encaustella Ragonot, 1893

Synonyms
- Salebria confluella Caradja, 1916

Species of moth

Acrobasis encaustella is a species of snout moth in the genus Acrobasis. It was described by Ragonot, in 1893. It is found in China.
