= Acrobasis zacharias =

Scientific classification
- Kingdom: Animalia
- Phylum: Arthropoda
- Clade: Pancrustacea
- Class: Insecta
- Order: Lepidoptera
- Family: Pyralidae
- Genus: Acrobasis
- Species: A. zacharias

Binomial name
- Acrobasis zacharias Roesler, 1988

Species of moth

Acrobasis zacharias is a species of snout moth in the genus Acrobasis. It was described by Roesler in 1988. It is found in Afghanistan.
