= Acrobasis epaxia =

Scientific classification
- Kingdom: Animalia
- Phylum: Arthropoda
- Clade: Pancrustacea
- Class: Insecta
- Order: Lepidoptera
- Family: Pyralidae
- Genus: Acrobasis
- Species: A. epaxia

Binomial name
- Acrobasis epaxia (Turner, 1947)

Synonyms
- Tylochares epaxia Turner, 1947

Species of moth

Acrobasis epaxia is a species of snout moth in the genus Acrobasis. It was described by Alfred Jefferis Turner in 1947, and is known from Australia.
