= Acrobasis vicinella =

Scientific classification
- Kingdom: Animalia
- Phylum: Arthropoda
- Clade: Pancrustacea
- Class: Insecta
- Order: Lepidoptera
- Family: Pyralidae
- Genus: Acrobasis
- Species: A. vicinella

Binomial name
- Acrobasis vicinella (Yamanaka, 2000)

Synonyms
- Trachycera vicinella Yamanaka, 2000

Species of moth

Acrobasis vicinella is a species of snout moth in the genus Acrobasis. It was described by Hiroshi Yamanaka in 2000. It is found in Japan.
