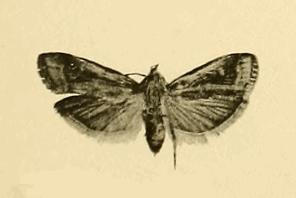

Scientific classification
- Kingdom: Animalia
- Phylum: Arthropoda
- Clade: Pancrustacea
- Class: Insecta
- Order: Lepidoptera
- Family: Pyralidae
- Genus: Acrobasis
- Species: A. getuliella

Binomial name
- Acrobasis getuliella (Zerny, 1914)

Synonyms
- Rhodophaea getuliella Zerny, 1914; Trachycera getuliella; Cyprusia wiltshirei Amsel, 1958

= Acrobasis getuliella =

Species of moth

Acrobasis getuliella is a species of snout moth in the genus Acrobasis. It was described by Zerny in 1914. It is found in Croatia and on Sicily and Cyprus.
