= Acrobasis squalidella =

Scientific classification
- Kingdom: Animalia
- Phylum: Arthropoda
- Clade: Pancrustacea
- Class: Insecta
- Order: Lepidoptera
- Family: Pyralidae
- Genus: Acrobasis
- Species: A. squalidella

Binomial name
- Acrobasis squalidella Christoph, 1881

Synonyms
- Nephopteryx trigonalis Wileman, 1911; Rhodophaea tokiella Ragonot, 1893

Species of moth

Acrobasis squalidella is a species of snout moth in the genus Acrobasis. It was described by Hugo Theodor Christoph in 1881. It is found in Russia and Japan.
