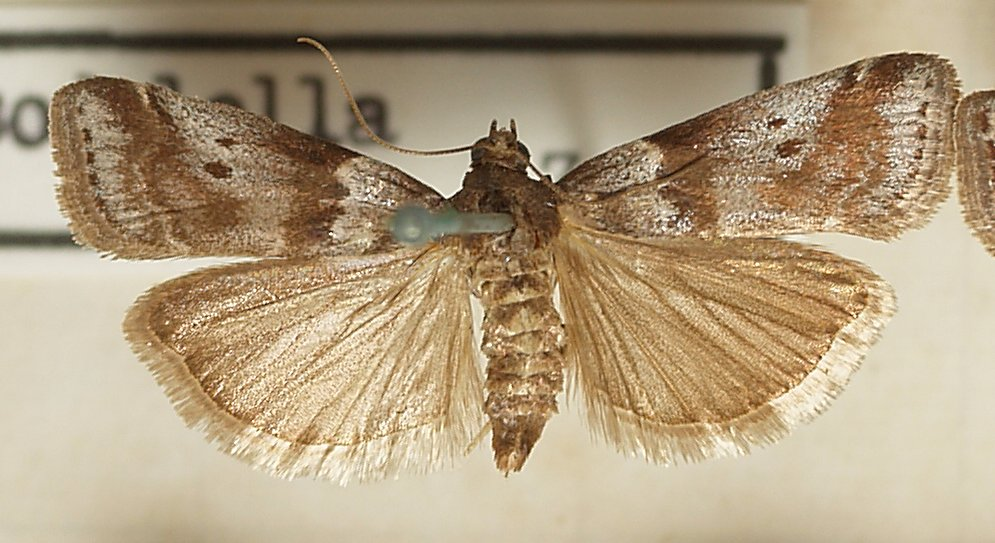
- Acrobasis sodalella

Scientific classification
- Domain: Eukaryota
- Kingdom: Animalia
- Phylum: Arthropoda
- Class: Insecta
- Order: Lepidoptera
- Family: Pyralidae
- Tribe: Phycitini
- Genus: Acrobasis; Zeller, 1839

Species
- See text

Synonyms
- Acrocaula Hulst, 1900; Catacrobasis Gozmány, 1958; Conobathra Meyrick, 1886; Cyphita Roesler, 1971; Cyprusia Amsel, 1958; Mineola Hulst, 1890; Numonia Ragonot, 1893; Hylopylora Meyrick, 1933; Hylophora Whalley, 1970; Rhodophaeopsis Amsel, 1950; Seneca Hulst, 1890; Trachycera Ragonot, 1893

= Acrobasis =

Genus of moths

Acrobasis is a genus of moths of the family Pyralidae.

== Species ==
- vaccinii species group
  - Acrobasis amplexella
  - Acrobasis vaccinii – cranberry fruitworm moth
- indigenella species group
  - Acrobasis indigenella – leaf crumpler moth
- tricolorella species group
  - Acrobasis tricolorella – destructive prune worm, tricolored acrobasis moth
- comptella species group
  - Acrobasis comptella
- minimella species group
  - Acrobasis blanchardorum
  - Acrobasis minimella
- caryae species group
  - Acrobasis caryae – hickory shoot borer moth
  - Acrobasis caulivorella
  - Acrobasis elyi
  - Acrobasis evanescentella
  - Acrobasis juglanivorella
  - Acrobasis nuxvorella – pecan nut casebearer moth
  - Acrobasis texana
- stigmella species group
  - Acrobasis angusella – hickory leafstem borer moth
  - Acrobasis aurorella
  - Acrobasis demotella – walnut shoot moth
  - Acrobasis exsulella – cordovan pyralid moth
  - Acrobasis latifasciella
  - Acrobasis stigmella
- palliolella species group
  - Acrobasis caryalbella
  - Acrobasis juglandis – pecan leaf casebearer moth
  - Acrobasis kearfottella – Kearfott's acrobasis moth
  - Acrobasis palliolella – mantled acrobasis moth
- caryivorella species group
  - Acrobasis caryivorella
- cunulae species group
  - Acrobasis betulella – birch tubemaker moth
  - Acrobasis betulivorella
  - Acrobasis carpinivorella
  - Acrobasis cirroferella
  - Acrobasis comptoniella – sweetfern leaf casebearer moth
  - Acrobasis coryliella
  - Acrobasis cunulae
  - Acrobasis irrubriella
  - Acrobasis kylesi
  - Acrobasis normella
  - Acrobasis ostryella
  - Acrobasis rubrifasciella – alder tubemaker moth
  - Acrobasis sylviella – ironwood tubemaker moth
- Unknown species group
  - Acrobasis advenella (Zincken, 1818) [?same as Dusungwua advenella, from Furcata]
  - Acrobasis africanella Balinsky, 1994
  - Acrobasis aicha Asselbergs, 1998
  - Acrobasis alexandra Roesler & Küppers, 1981
  - Acrobasis aqualidella Christoph, 1881
  - Acrobasis atelogramma (Meyrick, 1937)
  - Acrobasis atrisquamella
  - Acrobasis automorpha (Meyrick, 1886)
  - Acrobasis baharaca (Roesler, 1987)
  - Acrobasis bifidella (Leech, 1889)
  - Acrobasis birgitella (Roesler, 1975)
  - Acrobasis bithynella
  - Acrobasis bouchirella (Amsel, 1951)
  - Acrobasis caliginella (Hulst, 1878)
  - Acrobasis canella Yamanaka, 2003
  - Acrobasis cantonella (Caradja, 1925)
  - Acrobasis caribbeana J. C. Shaffer, 1978
  - Acrobasis celticola Staudinger, 1879
  - Acrobasis celtifoliella Yamanaka, 2004
  - Acrobasis centunculella
  - Acrobasis consociella
  - Acrobasis corethropus (Turner, 1904)
  - Acrobasis craterantis (Meyrick, 1933)
  - Acrobasis curvella (Ragonot, 1893)
  - Acrobasis cymindella (Ragonot, 1893)
  - Acrobasis dharma Roesler & Küppers, 1981
  - Acrobasis diversicolor Ragonot, 1893
  - Acrobasis dulcella (Zeller, 1848)
  - Acrobasis eburnella (Amsel, 1954)
  - Acrobasis encaustella Ragonot, 1893
  - Acrobasis epaxia
  - Acrobasis erastriella (Ragonot, 1887)
  - Acrobasis ereboscopa
  - Acrobasis eva Roesler & Küppers, 1981
  - Acrobasis fallouella (Ragonot, 1871)
  - Acrobasis farsella (Amsel, 1950)
  - Acrobasis ferruginella Wileman, 1911
  - Acrobasis flavifasciella Yamanaka, 1990
  - Acrobasis foroiuliensis Huemer & Nuss, 2007
  - Acrobasis frankella (Roesler, 1975)
  - Acrobasis fuscatella Yamanaka, 2004
  - Acrobasis getuliella (Zerny, 1914)
  - Acrobasis glaucella
  - Acrobasis hemiargyralis (Hampson, 1908)
  - Acrobasis hemichlaena (Meyrick, 1887)
  - Acrobasis hollandella (Ragonot, 1893)
  - Acrobasis homoeosomidia Hampson, 1901
  - Acrobasis injunctella (Christoph, 1881)
  - Acrobasis izuensis Yamanaka, 2004
  - Acrobasis khachella (Amsel, 1950)
  - Acrobasis klimeschi Roesler, 1978
  - Acrobasis legatea (Haworth, 1811)
  - Acrobasis lienpingialis (Caradja, 1925)
  - Acrobasis lutulentella Yamanaka, 2003
  - Acrobasis malifoliella Yamanaka, 2003
  - Acrobasis marmorea (Haworth, 1811)
  - Acrobasis mienshani Caradja, 1939
  - Acrobasis minorella (Caradja, 1910)
  - Acrobasis minutalis Asselbergs, 2008
  - Acrobasis mirabiella (Toll, 1948)
  - Acrobasis mniaropis
  - Acrobasis modisequa Meyrick, 1934
  - Acrobasis nigribasalis Amsel, 1954
  - Acrobasis nipponella (Yamanaka, 2000)
  - Acrobasis niveicinctella (Ragonot, 1887)
  - Acrobasis obliqua
  - Acrobasis obrutella (Christoph, 1881)
  - Acrobasis obtusella
  - Acrobasis ochrifasciella Yamanaka, 2006 or Acrobasis ochrofasciella
  - Acrobasis olivalis
  - Acrobasis ottomana Caradja, 1916
  - Acrobasis pallicornella (Ragonot, 1887)
  - Acrobasis persicella (Amsel, 1951)
  - Acrobasis pirivorella
  - Acrobasis porphyrella
  - Acrobasis praefectella (Zerny, 1936)
  - Acrobasis ptilophanes Meyrick, 1929
  - Acrobasis quarcella (Roesler, 1987)
  - Acrobasis ramosella Walker, 1866
  - Acrobasis regina Roesler & Küppers, 1981
  - Acrobasis repandana (Fabricius, 1798)
  - Acrobasis romanella
  - Acrobasis rufilimbalis (Wileman, 1911)
  - Acrobasis rufizonella
  - Acrobasis sasakii Yamanaka, 2003
  - Acrobasis sirani (Roesler & Küppers, 1981)
  - Acrobasis sodalella
  - Acrobasis squalidella Christoph, 1881
  - Acrobasis suavella (Zincken, 1818)
  - Acrobasis subceltifoliella Yamanaka, 2006
  - Acrobasis subflavella (Inoue, 1982)
  - Acrobasis susanna Roesler & Küppers, 1981
  - Acrobasis tricolorella (Inoue, 1982) (described as Conobathra tricolorella. Preocc. Acrobasis tricolorella. Replacement name unknown) – destructive pruneworm moth
  - Acrobasis tumidana
  - Acrobasis vicinella (Yamanaka, 2000)
  - Acrobasis vinaceellum (Ragonot, 1901)
  - Acrobasis xanthogramma (Staudinger, 1870)
  - Acrobasis yakushimensis (Yamanaka, 2000)
  - Acrobasis zacharias Roesler, 1988
  - Acrobasis zamantha (Roesler, 1987)
  - Acrobasis zyziphella Rebel, 1914
