= Acrobasis irrubriella =

Scientific classification
- Kingdom: Animalia
- Phylum: Arthropoda
- Clade: Pancrustacea
- Class: Insecta
- Order: Lepidoptera
- Family: Pyralidae
- Genus: Acrobasis
- Species: A. irrubriella

Binomial name
- Acrobasis irrubriella Ely, 1908

Species of moth

Acrobasis irrubriella is a species of snout moth in the genus Acrobasis. It was described by Charles Russell Ely in 1908 and is known from Connecticut, United States.
