= Acrobasis mniaropis =

Scientific classification
- Kingdom: Animalia
- Phylum: Arthropoda
- Clade: Pancrustacea
- Class: Insecta
- Order: Lepidoptera
- Family: Pyralidae
- Genus: Acrobasis
- Species: A. mniaropis

Binomial name
- Acrobasis mniaropis (Turner, 1904)

Synonyms
- Ceroprepes mniaropis Turner, 1904

Species of moth

Acrobasis mniaropis is a species of snout moth in the genus Acrobasis. It was described by Turner in 1904, and is known from Australia.
