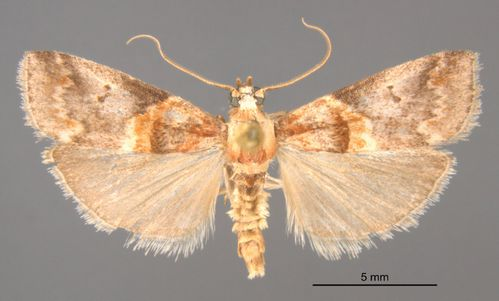

Scientific classification
- Kingdom: Animalia
- Phylum: Arthropoda
- Clade: Pancrustacea
- Class: Insecta
- Order: Lepidoptera
- Family: Pyralidae
- Genus: Acrobasis
- Species: A. latifasciella

Binomial name
- Acrobasis latifasciella Dyar, 1908

= Acrobasis latifasciella =

Species of moth

Acrobasis latifasciella is a species of snout moth in the genus Acrobasis. It was described by Harrison Gray Dyar Jr., in 1908, and is known from the northeastern United States.

The larvae feed on Juglans nigra and possibly Carya species.
