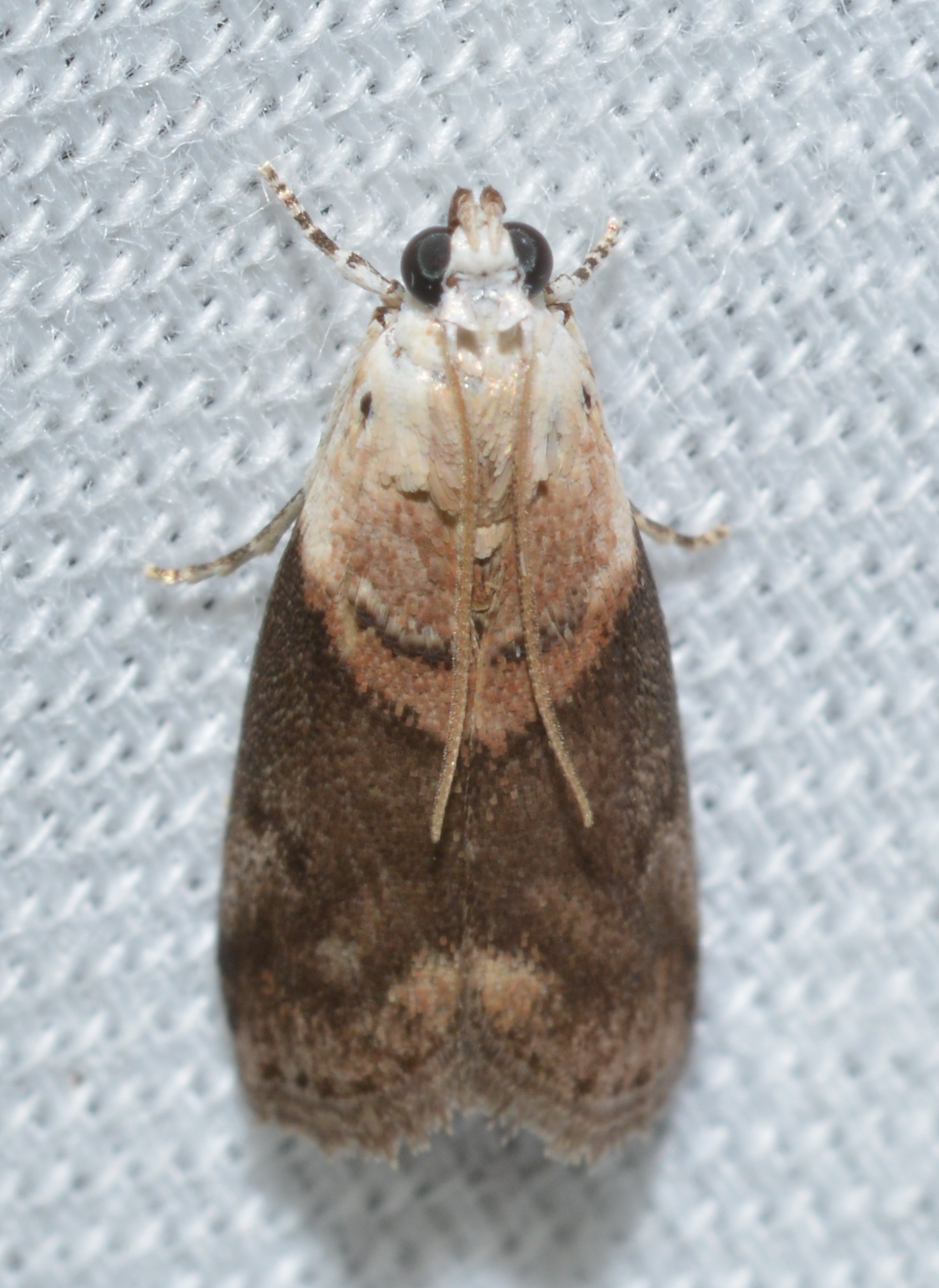

Scientific classification
- Kingdom: Animalia
- Phylum: Arthropoda
- Clade: Pancrustacea
- Class: Insecta
- Order: Lepidoptera
- Family: Pyralidae
- Genus: Acrobasis
- Species: A. palliolella

Binomial name
- Acrobasis palliolella Ragonot, 1887

Synonyms
- Acrobasis albocapitella Hulst, 1888; Acrobasis feltella Dyar, 1910

= Acrobasis palliolella =

Mantled acrobasis moth

Species of moth

Acrobasis palliolella, the mantled acrobasis moth, is a species of snout moth in the genus Acrobasis. It was described by Ragonot in 1887, and is known from Ontario, Canada, and the eastern United States.

The larvae feed on Carya species, including Carya ovata and Carya carolinae-septentrionalis.
