= Acrobasis ramosella =

Scientific classification
- Kingdom: Animalia
- Phylum: Arthropoda
- Clade: Pancrustacea
- Class: Insecta
- Order: Lepidoptera
- Family: Pyralidae
- Genus: Acrobasis
- Species: A. ramosella

Binomial name
- Acrobasis ramosella Walker, 1866

Species of moth

Acrobasis ramosella is a species of snout moth in the genus Acrobasis. It was described by Francis Walker in 1866. It is found in South Africa.
