= List of moths of Russia (Pyraloidea-Drepanoidea) =

This is a list of the Russian moth species of the superfamilies Pyraloidea, Cimelioidea, Calliduloidae and Drepanoidea. It also acts as an index to the species articles and forms part of the full List of moths of Russia.

== Pyraloidea ==
=== Pyralidae ===
- Achroia grisella (Fabricius, 1794)
- Acrobasis birgitella (Roesler, 1975)
- Acrobasis consociella (Hübner, [1813])
- Acrobasis curvella (Ragonot, 1893)
- Acrobasis cymindella (Ragonot, 1893)
- Acrobasis cynicella (Christoph, 1881)
- Acrobasis encaustella Ragonot, 1893
- Acrobasis flavifasciella Yamanaka, 1990
- Acrobasis frankella (Roesler, 1975)
- Acrobasis glaucella Staudinger, 1859
- Acrobasis injunctella (Christoph, 1881)
- Acrobasis obrutella (Christoph, 1881)
- Acrobasis obtusella (Hübner, 1796)
- Acrobasis porphyrella (Duponchel, 1836)
- Acrobasis rufilimbalis (Wileman, 1911)
- Acrobasis rufizonella Ragonot, 1887
- Acrobasis sodalella Zeller, 1848
- Acrobasis squalidella Christoph, 1881
- Acrobasis tokiella (Ragonot, 1893)
- Actenia incalidalis (Hübner, [1825])
- Actenia serratalis Hampson, 1900
- Aglossa caprealis (Hübner, [1809])
- Aglossa dimidiata (Haworth, 1810)
- Aglossa pinguinalis (Linnaeus, 1758)
- Ancylodes dealbatella (Erschoff, 1874)
- Ancylodes pallens Ragonot, 1887
- Ancylosis albicosta (Staudinger, 1870)
- Ancylosis anarchica Roesler, 1970
- Ancylosis anguinosella Zeller, 1848
- Ancylosis cinnamomella (Duponchel, 1836)
- Ancylosis citrinella (Ragonot, 1887)
- Ancylosis dryadella (Ragonot, 1887)
- Ancylosis dumetella Ragonot, 1887
- Ancylosis faustinella (Zeller, 1867)
- Ancylosis flammella Ragonot, 1887
- Ancylosis griseomixtella Ragonot, 1887
- Ancylosis lacteicostella (Ragonot, 1887)
- Ancylosis leucocephala (Staudinger, 1879)
- Ancylosis lividella (Ragonot, 1887)
- Ancylosis maculifera Staudinger, 1870
- Ancylosis monostictella (Ragonot, 1887)
- Ancylosis nervosella (Zerny, 1914)
- Ancylosis nigripunctella (Staudinger, 1879)
- Ancylosis oblitella (Zeller, 1848)
- Ancylosis pallida (Staudinger, 1870)
- Ancylosis plumbatella (Ragonot, 1888)
- Ancylosis pyrethrella (Herrich-Schäffer, 1860)
- Ancylosis rhodochrella (Herrich-Schäffer, 1855)
- Ancylosis roscidella (Eversmann, 1844)
- Ancylosis sabulosella (Staudinger, 1879)
- Ancylosis samaritanella (Zeller, 1867)
- Ancylosis sareptella (Herrich-Schäffer, 1861)
- Ancylosis syrtella (Ragonot, 1887)
- Ancylosis turaniella Ragonot, 1901
- Ancylosis urbicella (Erschoff, 1874)
- Ancylosis xylinella (Staudinger, 1870)
- Ancylosoma substratellum (Christoph, 1877)
- Anerastia korbi Caradja, 1910
- Anerastia lotella (Hübner, [1813])
- Aphomia curvicostella (Zerny, 1914)
- Aphomia foedella (Zeller, 1839)
- Aphomia sociella (Linnaeus, 1758)
- Aphomia zelleri de Joannis, 1932
- Aphyletes nigrisparsella (Ragonot, 1887)
- Apomyelois bistriatella (Hulst, 1887)
- Apomyelois ceratoniae (Zeller, 1839)
- Apomyelois cognata (Staudinger, 1871)
- Apomyelois subcognata (Ragonot, 1887)
- Asalebria florella (Mann, 1862)
- Asalebria subrubella Amsel, 1970
- Asalebria venustella (Ragonot, 1887)
- Asarta aethiopella (Duponchel, 1837)
- Assara korbi (Caradja, 1910)
- Assara terebrella (Zincken, 1818)
- Auxacia bilineella (Ragonot, 1887)
- Bradyrrhoa gilveolella (Treitschke, 1832)
- Cadra calidella (Guenée, 1845)
- Cadra cautella (Walker, 1863)
- Cadra figulilella (Gregson, 1871)
- Cadra furcatella (Herrich-Schäffer, 1849)
- Canarsia vittatella (Ragonot, 1887)
- Catastia kistrandella Opheim, 1963
- Catastia marginea ([Denis & Schiffermüller], 1775)
- Catastia umbrosella Erschoff, 1877
- Ceroprepes fusconebulella Yamanaka & Kirpichnikova, 2000
- Christophia ectypella (Ragonot, 1888)
- Cnephidia kenteriella Ragonot, 1892
- Conobathra repandana (Fabricius, 1798)
- Conobathra tumidana ([Denis & Schiffermüller], 1775)
- Copamyntis martimella Kirpichnikova & Yamanaka, 2002
- Corcyra cephalonica (Stainton, 1866)
- Cremnophila auranticiliella Ragonot, 1893
- Cremnophila sedakovella (Eversmann, 1851)
- Cryptoblabes bistriga (Haworth, 1811)
- Cryptoblabes loxiella Ragonot, 1887
- Datanoides fasciata Butler, 1878
- Dectocera tristis Kirpichnikova & Yamanaka, 1999
- Dioryctria abietella ([Denis & Schiffermüller], 1775)
- Dioryctria pryeri Ragonot, 1893
- Dioryctria schuetzeella Fuchs, 1899
- Dioryctria simplicella Heinemann, 1863
- Dioryctria sylvestrella (Ratzeburg, 1840)
- Eccopisa effractella Zeller, 1848
- Ectomyelois pyrivorella (Matsumura, 1900)
- Elegia similella (Zincken, 1818)
- Ematheudes punctella (Treitschke, 1833)
- Ematheudes varicella Ragonot, 1887
- Emmalocera gensanalis South, 1901
- Endotricha admirabilis Kirpichnikova, 2003
- Endotricha costaemaculalis Christoph, 1881
- Endotricha flammealis ([Denis & Schiffermüller], 1775)
- Endotricha flavofascialis (Bremer, 1864)
- Endotricha icelusalis Walker, 1859
- Endotricha kuznetzovi Whalley, 1963
- Endotricha olivacealis (Bremer, 1864)
- Endotricha portialis Walker, 1859
- Endotricha valentis Kirpichnikova, 2003
- Ephestia animella Nupponen & Junnilainen, 1998
- Ephestia elutella (Hübner, 1796)
- Ephestia kuehniella Zeller, 1879
- Ephestia parasitella Staudinger, 1859
- Ephestia welseriella (Zeller, 1848)
- Epidauria strigosa (Staudinger, 1879)
- Epischidia caesariella (Ragonot, 1901)
- Epischidia fulvostrigella (Eversmann, 1844)
- Epischnia adultella (Zeller, 1848)
- Epischnia ampliatella Heinemann, 1864
- Epischnia cretaciella Mann, 1869
- Epischnia cuculliella Ragonot, 1887
- Epischnia eximia Kirpichnikova, 2001
- Epischnia glyphella Ragonot, 1887
- Epischnia illotella Zeller, 1839
- Epischnia juldusella Caradja, 1916
- Epischnia lydella (Lederer, 1865)
- Epischnia mongolica Amsel, 1954
- Epischnia prodromella (Hübner, [1799])
- Epischnia zophodiella Ragonot, 1887
- Episcythrastis tabidella (Mann, 1864)
- Episcythrastis tetricella ([Denis & Schiffermüller], 1775)
- Etiella zinckenella (Treitschke, 1832)
- Etielloides bipartitellus (Leech, 1889)
- Etielloides kogii Yamanaka, 1998
- Etielloides sejunctella (Christoph, 1881)
- Eucarphia vinetella (Fabricius, 1787)
- Eurhodope cirrigerella (Zincken, 1818)
- Eurhodope pseudodichromella Yamanaka, 1980
- Eurhodope rosella (Scopoli, 1763)
- Euzophera afflictella Ragonot, 1887
- Euzophera albicostalis Hampson, 1903
- Euzophera alpherakyella Ragonot, 1887
- Euzophera batangensis Caradja, 1939
- Euzophera bigella (Zeller, 1848)
- Euzophera cinerosella (Zeller, 1839)
- Euzophera costivittella Ragonot, 1887
- Euzophera formosella (Rebel, 1910)
- Euzophera fuliginosella (Heinemann, 1865)
- Euzophera lunulella (Costa, [1836])
- Euzophera pinguis (Haworth, 1811)
- Euzophera rubricetella (Herrich-Schäffer, 1855)
- Euzophera tetragramma (Rebe1, 1910)
- Euzopherodes oberleae Roes1er, 1973
- Galleria mellonella (Linnaeus, 1758)
- Glyptoteles leucacrinella Zeller, 1848
- Gymnancyla barbatella Erschoff, 1874
- Gymnancyla canella ([Denis & Schiffermüller], 1775)
- Gymnancyla craticulella (Ragonot, 1887)
- Gymnancyla hornigi (Lederer, 1852)
- Hoeneodes sinensis (Caradja, 1937)
- Homoeosoma calcellum Ragonot, 1887
- Homoeosoma candefactellum Ragonot, 1887
- Homoeosoma caradjellum Roesler, 1965
- Homoeosoma heidiellum Roesler, 1967
- Homoeosoma inustellum Ragonot, 1884
- Homoeosoma matsumurellum Shibuya, 1927
- Homoeosoma nebulellum ([Denis & Schiffermüller], 1775)
- Homoeosoma nimbella (Duponchel, 1837)
- Homoeosoma punctistrigellum Ragonot, 1888
- Homoeosoma sinuellum (Fabricius, 1794)
- Homoeosoma subalbatellum (Mann, 1864)
- Hypochalcia ahenella ([Denis & Schiffermüller], 1775)
- Hypochalcia caminariella Erschoff, 1877
- Hypochalcia castanella Ragonot, 1887
- Hypochalcia decorella (Hübner, [1810])
- Hypochalcia dignella (Hübner, 1796)
- Hypochalcia disjunctella Zeller, 1848
- Hypochalcia griseoaenella Ragonot, 1887
- Hypochalcia lignella (Hübner, 1796)
- Hypochalcia propinquella (Eversmann, 1842)
- Hypochalcia staudingeri Ragonot, 1887
- Hyporatasa allotriella (Herrich-Schäffer, 1855)
- Hypotia colchicalis (Herrich-Schäffer, 1851)
- Hypotia concatenalis Lederer, 1858
- Hypotia massilialis (Duponchel, 1832)
- Hypsopygia costalis (Fabricius, 1775)
- Hypsopygia fulvocilialis (Duponchel, 1832)
- Hypsopygia glaucinalis (Linnaeus, 1758)
- Hypsopygia iwamotoi Kirpichnikova & Yamanaka, 1995
- Hypsopygia placens (Butler, 1879)
- Hypsopygia regina (Butler, 1879)
- Hypsopygia rubidalis ([Denis & Schiffermüller], 1775)
- Hypsotropa limbella Zeller, 1848
- Hypsotropa solipunctella Ragonot, 1901
- Hypsotropa unipunctella Ragonot, 1888
- Insalebria kozhantshikovi Filipjev, 1924
- Insalebria serraticornella (Zeller, 1839)
- Isauria dilucidella (Duponchel, 1836)
- Jacutscia strigata Hampson, 1930
- Keradere tengstroemiella (Erschoff, 1874)
- Khorassania compositella (Treitschke, 1835)
- Khorassania imitatella (Ragonot, 1893)
- Lamoria anella ([Denis & Schiffermüller], 1775)
- Lamoria melanophlebia Ragonot, 1888
- Lamoria ruficostella Ragonot, 1888
- Lepidogma atribasalis (Hampson, 1900)
- Lista ficki (Christoph, 1881)
- Lymphia chalybella (Eversmann, 1844)
- Macalla amica (Butler, 1879)
- Macalla amurensis Hampson, 1900
- Magadania cognata Kirpichnikova & Yamanaka, 2001
- Megasis dentinella (Bremer, 1864)
- Megasis ragonoti Leraut, 2003
- Megasis rippertella (Zeller, 1839)
- Merulempista cingillella (Zeller, 1846)
- Merulempista nigrolineatella Shibuya, 1927
- Merulempista ophthalmicella (Christoph, 1881)
- Merulempista patriciella Zeller, 1867
- Mimopolyocha obscurella (Matsumura, 1911)
- Monotonia straminella (Zerny, 1914)
- Morosaphycita maculata (Staudinger, 1876)
- Myelois circumvoluta (Fourcroy, 1785)
- Myelois fuscicostella Mann, 1861
- Myelopsis rufimaculella Yamanaka, 1993
- Myrlaea marmorata (Alphéraky, 1876)
- Nephopterix angustella (Hübner, 1796)
- Nephopterix nocticolorella Ragonot, 1887
- Noctuides melanophia Staudinger, 1892
- Nyctegretis lineana (Scopoli, 1786)
- Nyctegretis triangulella Ragonot, 1901
- Oligochroa bilineatella (Inoue, 1859)
- Oncocera combustella (Herrich-Schäffer, 1855)
- Oncocera faecella (Zeller, 1839)
- Oncocera griseosparsella Ragonot, 1893
- Oncocera semirubella (Scopoli, 1763)
- Orthaga achatina Butler, 1878
- Orthaga olivacea (Warren, 1891)
- Orthaga onerata Butler, 1879
- Ortholepis atratella (Yamanaka, 1986)
- Ortholepis betulae (Goeze, 1778)
- Ortholepis nigrisparsella Caradja, 1926
- Ortholepis vacciniella (Lienig & Zeller, 1847)
- Oxybia transversella (Duponchel, 1836)
- Paralipsa gularis (Zeller, 1877)
- Paralipsa spoliatrix (Christoph, 1881)
- Parasclerobia pimatella (Caradja, 1927)
- Patagoniodes nipponella (Ragonot, 1901)
- Pempelia albariella (Zeller, 1839)
- Pempelia alpigenella (Duponchel, 1836)
- Pempelia corticinella (Ragonot, 1887)
- Pempelia distinctella Kirpichnikova & Yamanaka, 2002
- Pempelia formosa (Haworth, 1811)
- Pempelia fraternella (Ragonot, 1887)
- Pempelia geminella (Eversmann, 1844)
- Pempelia obductella Zeller, 1839
- Pempelia palumbella ([Denis & Schiffermüller], 1775)
- Pempeliella aurorella (Christoph, 1867)
- Pempeliella dilutella ([Denis & Schiffermüller], 1775)
- Pempeliella ornatella ([Denis & Schiffermüller], 1775)
- Phycita poteriella (Zeller, 1846)
- Phycita roborella ([Denis & Schiffermüller], 1775)
- Phycitodes albatella (Ragonot, 1887)
- Phycitodes binaevella (Hübner, [1813])
- Phycitodes crassipunctella (Caradja, 1928)
- Phycitodes lacteella (Rothschild, 1915)
- Phycitodes maritima (Tengstrom, 1848)
- Phycitodes saxicola (Vaughan, 1870)
- Phycitodes subcretacella (Ragonot, 1901)
- Phycitodes subolivacella (Ragonot, 1901)
- Phycitodes triangulella (Ragonot, 1901)
- Phycitodes unifasciellus Inoue, 1982
- Pima boisduvaliella (Guenée, 1845)
- Plodia interpunctella (Hübner, [1813])
- Polopeustis altensis (Wocke, 1862)
- Polyocha angustatus (Matsumura, 1911)
- Polyocha subfasciatella Ragonot, 1887
- Pseudacrobasis nankingella Roesler, 1975
- Pseudocadra cuprotaeniella (Christoph, 1881)
- Pseudocadra obscurella Roesler, 1965
- Pseudophycita deformella (Moschler, 1866)
- Psorosa dahliella (Treitschke, 1832)
- Psorosa decolorella Yamanaka, 1986
- Psorosa maraschella Caradja, 1910
- Psorosa nucleolella (Moschler, 1866)
- Pterothrixidia rufella (Duponchel, 1836)
- Pyla fusca (Haworth, 1811)
- Pyla manifestella Inoue, 1982
- Pyralis farinalis (Linnaeus, 1758)
- Pyralis kacheticalis (Christoph, 1893)
- Pyralis lienigialis (Zeller, 1843)
- Pyralis perversalis (Herrich-Schäffer, 1849)
- Pyralis princeps (Butler, 1889)
- Pyralis regalis ([Denis & Schiffermüller], 1775)
- Quasipuer colon (Christoph, 1881)
- Raphimetopus incarnatella (Ragonot, 1887)
- Raphimetopus nitidicostella (Ragonot, 1887)
- Ratasa noctualis (Eversmann, 1842)
- Salebriopsis albicilla (Herrich-Schäffer, 1849)
- Salinaria diffusella (Christoph, 1872)
- Samoilovia larisa Kirpichnikova, 2001
- Samoilovia taisia Kirpichnikova, 2001
- Scenedra umbrosalis (Wileman, 1911)
- Sciota adelphella (Fischer von Röslerstamm, 1836)
- Sciota bicolorella (Leech, 1889)
- Sciota confluella (Caradj a, 1916)
- Sciota divisella (Duponchel, 1842)
- Sciota ferruginella (Zerny, 1914
- Sciota fumella (Eversmann, 1844)
- Sciota hostilis (Stephens, 1834)
- Sciota lucipetella (Jalava, 1978)
- Sciota rhenella (Zincken, 1818)
- Seeboldia korgosella Ragonot, 1887
- Selagia argyrella ([Denis & Schiffermüller], 1775)
- Selagia spadicella (Hübner, 1796)
- Selagia subochrella (Herrich-Schäffer, 1849)
- Selagia uralensis Rebel, 1910
- Staudingeria adusrella Ragonot, 1887
- Staudingeria aspilatella (Ragonot, 1887)
- Staudingeria deserticola (Staudinger, 1870)
- Staudingeria gozmanyella Roesler, 1970
- Staudingeria morbosella (Staudinger, 1879)
- Staudingeria partitella Ragonot, 1887
- Staudingeria unicolorella Roesler, 1970
- Stemmatophora kaszabi Whalley, 1966
- Synaphe amuralis (Hampson, 1900)
- Synaphe antennalis (Fabricius, 1794)
- Synaphe bombycalis ([Denis & Schiffermüller], 1775)
- Synaphe infumatalis Erschoff, 1874
- Synaphe moldavica (Esper, 1794)
- Synaphe punctalis (Fabricius, 1775)
- Teliphasa albifusa (Hampson, 1896)
- Teliphasa elegans (Butler, 1881)
- Termioptycha inimica (Butler, 1879)
- Termioptycha nigrescens (Warren, 1891)
- Thospia permixtella Ragonot, 1888
- Thospia trifasciella (Ragonot, 1887)
- Trachonitis cristella ([Denis & Schiffermüller], 1775)
- Trachonitis rufibasella Yamanaka, 1978
- Trachycera advenella (Zincken, 1818)
- Trachycera dulcella (Zeller, 1848)
- Trachycera hollandella Ragonot, 1893
- Trachycera legatea (Haworth, 1811)
- Trachycera marmorea (Haworth, 1811)
- Trachycera niveicinctella Ragonot, 1887
- Trachycera suavella (Zincken, 1818)
- Vietteia terstrigella (Christoph, 1877)
- Vitula biviella (Zeller, 1848)
- Zophodia grossulariella (Hübner, [1809])

=== Crambidae ===
- Acentria ephemerella ([Denis & Schiffermüller], 1775)
- Achyra nudalis (Hübner, 1796)
- Achyra ustrinalis (Christoph, 1877)
- Acropentias aurea (Butler, 1879)
- Aeschremon disparalis (Herrich-Schäffer, 1851)
- Agriphila aeneociliella (Eversmann, 1844)
- Agriphila biarmica (Tengstrom, 1865)
- Agriphila deliella (Hübner, [1813])
- Agriphila hungarica (Schmidt, 1909)
- Agriphila inquinatella ([Denis & Schiffermüller], 1775)
- Agriphila poliella (Treitschke, 1832)
- Agriphila sakayehamana (Matsumura, 1925)
- Agriphila selasella (Hübner, [1813])
- Agriphila straminella ([Denis & Schiffermüller], 1775)
- Agriphila tersella (Lederer, 1855)
- Agriphila tolli (Błeszyński, 1952)
- Agriphila tristella ([Denis & Schiffermüller], 1775)
- Agrotera nemoralis (Scopoli, 1763)
- Algedonia luctualis (Hübner, 1793)
- Algedonia terrealis (Treitschke, 1829)
- Amaurophanes stigmosalis (Herrich-Schäffer, 1848)
- Ambia colonalis (Bremer, 1864)
- Ambia yamanakai Kirpichnikova, 1993
- Ametasia ochrofascialis (Christoph, 1882)
- Analthes maculalis (Leech, 1889)
- Anania albeoverbascalis Yamanaka, 1966
- Anania egentalis (Christoph, 1881)
- Anania funebris (Strom, 1768)
- Anania fuscoverbascalis Mutuura, 1954
- Anania verbascalis ([Denis & Schiffermüller], 1775)
- Anarpia incertalis (Duponchel, 1832)
- Ancylolomia japonica Zeller, 1877
- Ancylolomia palpella ([Denis & Schiffermüller], 1775)
- Ancylolomia tentaculella (Hübner, 1796)
- Angustalius malacellus (Duponchel, 1836)
- Anthophilodes conchylialis Christoph, 1872
- Anthophilopsis baphialis (Staudinger, 1871)
- Anthophilopsis moeschleri (Christoph, 1862)
- Aporodes floralis (Hübner, [1809])
- Atralata albofascialis (Treitschke, 1829)
- Atralata melaleucalis (Eversmann, 1852)
- Botyodes diniasalis (Walker, 1859)
- Botyodes principalis (Leech, 1889)
- Bradina angustalis Yamanaka, 1984
- Bradina atopalis (Walker, 1859)
- Calamotropha aureliella (Fischer von Ros1erstamm, 1841)
- Calamotropha fulvifusalis (Hampson, 1900)
- Calamotropha kurentzovi Kirpichnikova, 1982
- Calamotropha nigripunctella (Leech, 1889)
- Calamotropha okanoi B1eszynski, 1961
- Calamotropha paludella (Hübner, [1824])
- Camptomastix hisbonalis (Wa1ker, 1859)
- Cataclysta lemnata (Linnaeus, 1758)
- Catagela subdodatella Inoue, 1982
- Catoptria aurora Błeszyński, 1965
- Catoptria cabardinica Bolov, 1999
- Catoptria caucasica (Alphéraky, 1878)
- Catoptria colchicella (Lederer, 1870)
- Catoptria conchella ([Denis & Schiffermüller], 1775)
- Catoptria daghestanica Błeszyński, 1965
- Catoptria falsella ([Denis & Schiffermüller], 1775)
- Catoptria fenestratella (Caradja, 1928)
- Catoptria fulgidella (Hübner, [1813])
- Catoptria furcatella (Zetterstedt, 1839)
- Catoptria furciferalis (Hampson, 1900)
- Catoptria laevigatella (Lederer, 1870)
- Catoptria languidella (Zeller, 1863)
- Catoptria lythargyrella (Hübner, 1796)
- Catoptria maculalis (Zetterstedt, 1839)
- Catoptria margaritella ([Denis & Schiffermüller], 1775)
- Catoptria myella (Hübner, 1796)
- Catoptria mytilella (Hübner, [1805])
- Catoptria permiaca (G.Petersen, 1924)
- Catoptria permutatella (Herrich-Schäffer, 1848)
- Catoptria persephone Błeszyński, 1965
- Catoptria pinella (Linnaeus, 1758)
- Catoptria profluxella (Christoph, 1887)
- Catoptria spodiella (Rebel, 1916)
- Catoptria trichostoma (Christoph, 1858)
- Catoptria verella (Zincken, 1817)
- Catoptria witimella Błeszyński, 1965
- Chabula telphusalis (Wa1ker, 1859)
- Chilo christophi Błeszyński, 1965
- Chilo hyrax Błeszyński, 1965
- Chilo luteellus (Motschulsky, 1866)
- Chilo phragmitellus (Hübner, [1805])
- Chilo pulverosellus Ragonot, 1895
- Chilo suppressalis (Walker, 1863)
- Cholius luteolaris (Scopoli, 1772)
- Chrysocrambus craterellus (Scopoli, 1763)
- Chrysocrambus linetellus (Fabricius, 1781)
- Chrysoteuchia argentistriella (Leech, 1889)
- Chrysoteuchia culmella (Linnaeus, 1758)
- Chrysoteuchia daisetsuzana (Matsumura, 1927)
- Chrysoteuchia diplogramma (Zeller, 1863)
- Chrysoteuchia distinctella (Leech, 1889)
- Chrysoteuchia gregorella B1eszynski, 1965
- Chrysoteuchia mandschurica (Christoph, 1881)
- Chrysoteuchia picturatella (South, 1901)
- Chrysoteuchia porcelanella (Motschu1sky, 1860)
- Chrysoteuchia pseudodiplogramma (Okano, 1962)
- Chrysoteuchia pyraustoides (Erschoff, 1877)
- Circobotys heterogenalis (Bremer, 1864)
- Circobotys nycterina Butler, 1879
- Clasperia ophialis (Treitschke, 1829)
- Cleptotypodes ledereri (Staudinger, 1870)
- Clupeosoma cinereum (Warren, 1892)
- Clupeosoma pryeri (Butler, 1881)
- Cnaphalocrocis medinalis (Guenée, 1854)
- Cotachena pubescens (Warren, 1892)
- Crambus alexandrus Kirpichnikova, 1979
- Crambus alienellus (Germar & Kaulfuss, 1817)
- Crambus ericellus (Hübner, [1813])
- Crambus hamellus (Thunberg, 1788)
- Crambus heringiellus (Herrich-Schäffer, 1848)
- Crambus humidellus Zeller, 1877
- Crambus isshiki Matsumura, 1925
- Crambus kindermanni Zeller, 1863
- Crambus lathoniellus (Zincken, 1817)
- Crambus pascuellus (Linnaeus, 1758)
- Crambus perlellus (Scopo1i, 1763)
- Crambus pratellus (Linnaeus, 1758)
- Crambus pseudargyrophorus Okano, 1960
- Crambus sachaensis Ustjuzhanin, 1988
- Crambus sibiricus Alphéraky, 1897
- Crambus silvellus (Hübner, [1813])
- Crambus uliginosellus Zeller, 1850
- Cynaeda dentalis ([Denis & Schiffermüller], 1775)
- Cynaeda forsteri de Lattin, 1951
- Diaphania indica (Saunder, 1851)
- Diasemia reticularis (Linnaeus, 1761)
- Diasemiopsis ramburialis (Duponchel, 1834)
- Diathraustodes amoenialis (Christoph, 1881)
- Dolicharthria bruguieralis (Duponchel, 1833)
- Dolicharthria punctalis ([Denis & Schiffermüller], 1775)
- Donacaula forficella (Thunberg, 1794)
- Donacaula mucronella ([Denis & Schiffermüller], 1775)
- Donacaula nilotica (Zeller, 1867)
- Ebulea crocealis (Hübner, 1796)
- Ebulea gracialis Bremer, 1864
- Ebulea testacealis (Zeller, 1847)
- Ecpyrrhorrhoe rubiginalis (Hübner, 1796)
- Elethyia taishanensis (Caradja, 1937)
- Elophila fengwhanalis (Pryer, 1877)
- Elophila interruptalis (Pryer, 1877)
- Elophila nymphaeata (Linnaeus, 1758)
- Elophila orientalis (Filipjev, 1934)
- Elophila turbata (Butler, 1881)
- Epascestria leucalis (Hampson, 1900)
- Epascestria pustulalis (Hilbner, [1823])
- Ephelis cruentalis (Geyer, 1832)
- Euchromius bella (Hübner, 1796)
- Euchromius bleszynskiellus Popescu-Gorj, 1964
- Euchromius gratiosella (Caradja, 1910)
- Euchromius jaxartellus (Erschoff, 1874)
- Euchromius mouchai Błeszyński, 1961
- Euchromius ocellea (Haworth, 1811)
- Euchromius ramburiellus (Duponchel, 1836)
- Euchromius rayatellus (Amsel, 1949)
- Euchromius superbellus (Zeller, 1849)
- Euclasta splendidalis (Herrich-Schäffer, 1848)
- Eudonia aequalis Kyrki & Svensson, 1986
- Eudonia alpina (Curtis, 1850)
- Eudonia delunella (Stainton, 1849)
- Eudonia lacustrata (Panzer, 1804)
- Eudonia laetella (Zeller, 1846)
- Eudonia mercurella (Linnaeus, 1758)
- Eudonia murana (Curtis, 1827)
- Eudonia pallida (Curtis, 1827)
- Eudonia phaeoleuca (Zeller, 1846)
- Eudonia puellaris Sasaki, 1991
- Eudonia sudetica (Zeller, 1839)
- Eudonia truncicolella (Stainton, 1849)
- Eudonia vallesialis (Duponchel, 1833)
- Eurrhypara hortulata (Linnaeus, 1758)
- Eurrhypis cacuminalis (Eversmann, 1843)
- Eurrhypis pollinalis ([Denis & Schiffermüller], 1775)
- Eurrhypis sartalis (Hübner, [1813])
- Evergestis aenealis ([Denis & Schiffermüller], 1775)
- Evergestis desertalis (Hübner, [1813])
- Evergestis extimalis (Scopoli, 1763)
- Evergestis ferrealis (Hampson, 1900)
- Evergestis forficalis (Linnaeus, 1758)
- Evergestis frumentalis (Linnaeus, 1761)
- Evergestis junctalis (Warren, 1892)
- Evergestis lichenalis Hampson, 1900
- Evergestis limbata (Linnaeus, 1767)
- Evergestis manglisalis Erschoff, 1877
- Evergestis nomadalis (Lederer, 1872)
- Evergestis orientalis Eversmann, 1851
- Evergestis pallidata (Hufnagel, 1767)
- Evergestis politalis ([Denis & Schiffermüller], 1775)
- Evergestis serratalis Staudinger, 1871)
- Evergestis sophialis (Fabricius, 1787)
- Evergestis sorhageni Sauber, 1899
- Evergestis spiniferalis Staudinger, 1900
- Evergestis umbrosalis (Fischer von Röslerstamm, 1842)
- Flavocrambus picassensis Błeszyński, 1965
- Friedlanderia cicatricella (Hübner, [1824])
- Gesneria centuriella ([Denis & Schiffermüller], 1775)
- Glaucocharis euchromiella (Ragonot, 1895)
- Glyphodes perspectalis (Walker, 1859)
- Glyphodes pryeri Butler, 1879
- Glyphodes pyloalis Walker, 1859
- Goniorhynchus explicatalis (Christoph, 1881)
- Heliothela wulfeniana (Scopoli, 1763)
- Hellula undalis (Fabricius, 1781)
- Herpetogramma fuscescens (Warren, 1892)
- Herpetogramma luctuosalis (Guenée, 1854)
- Herpetogramma magna (Butler, 1879)
- Herpetogramma moderatalis (Christoph, 1881)
- Herpetogramma phaeopteralis (Guenée, 1854)
- Herpetogramma pseudomagna Yamanaka, 1976
- Hyperlais dulcinalis (Treitschke, 1835)
- Japonichilo bleszynskii Okano, 1962
- Kasania arundinalis (Eversmann, 1842)
- Krombia bimedia (Filipjev, 1924)
- Krombia opistoleuca (FiIipjev, 1924)
- Loxostege aeruginalis (Hübner, 1796)
- Loxostege clathralis (Hübner, [1813])
- Loxostege commixtalis (Walker, 1866)
- Loxostege comptalis (Freyer, 1848)
- Loxostege concoloralis Lederer, 1857
- Loxostege deliblatica Szent-Ivany & Uhrik-Meszaros, 1942
- Loxostege ephippialis (Zetterstedt, 1839)
- Loxostege expansalis (Eversmann, 1852)
- Loxostege manualis (Geyer, 1832)
- Loxostege mucosalis (Herrich-Schäffer, 1848)
- Loxostege peltalis (Eversmann, 1842)
- Loxostege sedakowialis (Eversmann, 1852)
- Loxostege sticticalis (Linnaeus, 1761)
- Loxostege turbidalis (Treitschke, 1829)
- Loxostege virescalis (Guenée, 1854)
- Lygropia poltisalis (Walker, 1859)
- Mabra charonialis (Walker, 1864)
- Marasmia stereogona (Meyrick, 1886)
- Maruca testulalis (Geyer, 1832)
- Mecyna dissipatalis (Lederer, 1863)
- Mecyna flavalis ([Denis & Schiffermüller], 1775)
- Mecyna gracilis (Butler, 1879)
- Mecyna subsequalis (Herrich-Schäffer, 1851)
- Mecyna tricolor (Butler, 1879)
- Mecyna trinalis ([Denis & Schiffermüller], 1775)
- Mesocrambus candiellus (Herrich-Schäffer, 1848)
- Metacrambus carectellus (Zeller, 1847)
- Metacrambus jugaraicae Błeszyński, 1965
- Metasia suppandalis (Hübner, 1823)
- Metaxmeste phrygialis (Hübner, 1796)
- Metaxmeste schrankiana (Hochenwarth, 1785)
- Microchilo inouei Okano, 1962
- Miyakea expansa (Butler, 1881)
- Miyakea raddeella (Caradj a, 1910)
- Miyakea ussurica Ustjuzhanin & Schouten, 1995
- Nacoleia maculalis South, 1901
- Nacoleia sorosi Kirpichnikova, 1993
- Nacoleiopsis auriceps Matsumura, 1925
- Nascia cilialis (Hübner, 1796)
- Neoanalthes contortalis (Hampson, 1900)
- Neohendecasis apiciferalis (Walker, 1866)
- Neopediasia mixtalis (Walker, 1863)
- Neoschoenobia testacealis Hampson, 1900
- Nomis albopedalis Motschulsky, 1860
- Nomophila noctuella ([Denis & Schiffermüller], 1775)
- Notarcha basipunctalis (Bremer, 1864)
- Notarcha derogata (Fabricius, 1775)
- Notarcha doerriesi (Staudinger, 1892)
- Nymphula corculina (Butler, 1879)
- Nymphula distinctalis (Ragonot, 1894)
- Nymphula nitidulata (Hufnagel, 1767)
- Nymphula separatalis (Leech, 1889)
- Omiodes indicata (Fabricius, 1775)
- Omiodes misera (Butler, 1879)
- Omiodes sibirialis (Milliere, 1879)
- Omiodes tristrialis (Bremer, 1864)
- Opsibotys fuscalis ([Denis & Schiffermüller], 1775)
- Opsibotys hasanensis Kirpichnikova, 1996
- Orenaia alpestralis (Fabricius, 1787)
- Orphnophanes turbatalis Christoph, 1881
- Ostrinia furnacalis (Guenée, 1854)
- Ostrinia kasmirica (Moore, 1888)
- Ostrinia kurentzovi Mutuura & Munroe, 1970
- Ostrinia latipennis (Warren, 1892)
- Ostrinia nubilalis (Hübner, 1796)
- Ostrinia orientalis Mutuura & Munroe, 1970
- Ostrinia palustralis (Hübner, 1796)
- Ostrinia peregrinalis (Eversmann, 1852)
- Ostrinia quadripunctalis ([Denis & Schiffermüller], 1775)
- Ostrinia sanguinealis (Warren, 1892)
- Ostrinia scapulalis (Walker, 1859)
- Ostrinia zaguliaevi Mutuura & Munroe, 1970
- Ostrinia zealis (Guenée, 1854)
- Pachyzancloides sexmaculosus Matsumura, 1925
- Palpita nigropunctalis (Bremer, 1864)
- Palpita unionalis (Hi1bner, 1796)
- Paracorsia repandalis ([Denis & Schiffermüller], 1775)
- Paranomis sidemialis Munroe & Mutuura, 1968
- Parapoynx nivalis ([Denis & Schiffermüller], 1775)
- Parapoynx stratiotata (Linnaeus, 1758)
- Parapoynx ussuriensis (Rebel, 1910)
- Parapoynx vittalis (Bremer, 1864)
- Paratalanta cultralis (Staudinger, 1867)
- Paratalanta hyalinalis (Htlbner, 1796)
- Paratalanta jessica (Butler, 1878)
- Paratalanta pandalis Hübner, [1825]
- Paratalanta taiwanensis Yamanaka, 1972
- Paratalanta ussurialis (Bremer, 1864)
- Pareromene exsectella (Christoph, 1881)
- Pediasia altaica (Staudinger, 1900)
- Pediasia aridella (Thunberg, 1788)
- Pediasia contaminella (Hübner, 1796)
- Pediasia epineura (Meyrick, 1883)
- Pediasia fascelinella (Hübner, [1813])
- Pediasia georgella Kosakevitsh, 1978
- Pediasia gregori Roesler, 1975
- Pediasia huebneri Błeszyński, 1954
- Pediasia jucundella (Herrich-Schäffer, 1847)
- Pediasia kuldjaensis (Caradja, 1916)
- Pediasia ledereri Błeszyński, 1954
- Pediasia luteella ([Denis & Schiffermüller], 1775)
- Pediasia matricella (Treitschke, 1832)
- Pediasia pectinicornis (Rebel, 1910)
- Pediasia pedriolella (Duponchel, 1836)
- Pediasia persella (Toll, 1947)
- Pediasia pseudopersella Błeszyński, 1959
- Pediasia pudibundella (Herrich-Schäffer, 1852)
- Pediasia radicivitta (Filipjev, 1927)
- Pediasia sajanella (Caradja, 1925)
- Pediasia steppicolella (Zerny, 1914)
- Pediasia truncatella (Zetterstedt, 1839)
- Pediasia zellerella (Staudinger, 1900)
- Perinephela lancealis ([Denis & Schiffermüller], 1775)
- Phlyctaenia coronata (Hufnagel, 1767)
- Phlyctaenia perlucidalis (Hübner, [1809])
- Phlyctaenia stachydalis (Germar, 1821)
- Piletocera penicillalis (Christoph, 1881)
- Piletocera sodalis (Leech, 1889)
- Platytes alpinella (Hübner, [1813])
- Platytes cerussella ([Denis & Schiffermüller], 1775)
- Platytes ornatella (Leech, 1889)
- Platytes strigatalis (Hampson, 1900)
- Pleuroptya chlorophanta (Butler, 1878)
- Pleuroptya deficiens (Moore, 1887)
- Pleuroptya expictalis (Christoph, 1881)
- Pleuroptya harutai (Inoue, 1955)
- Pleuroptya inferior (Hampson, 1898)
- Pleuroptya quadrimaculalis (Kollar, 1844)
- Pleuroptya ruralis (Scopoli, 1763)
- Potamusa midas (Butler, 1881)
- Prochoristis capparidis (Christoph, 1877)
- Prochoristis rupicapralis (Lederer, 1855)
- Prochoristis simplicealis (Bremer, 1864)
- Prodasycnemis inornata (Butler, 1879)
- Proteurrhypara ocellalis (Warren, 1892)
- Psammotis orientalis Munroe & Mutuura, 1968
- Psammotis pulveralis (Hübner, 1796)
- Pseudebulea fentoni Butler, 1881
- Pseudobissetia terrestrella (Christoph, 1885)
- Pseudocatharylla inclaralis (Walker, 1863)
- Pseudocatharylla simplex (Ze1ler, 1877)
- Pycnarmon cribrata (Fabricius, 1794)
- Pycnarmon lactiferalis (Walker, 1859)
- Pycnarmon pantherata (But1er, 1878)
- Pycnarmon tylostegalis (Hampson, 1900)
- Pygospila tyres (Cramer, 1789)
- Pyrausta aerealis (Hübner, 1793)
- Pyrausta aurata (Scopoli, 1763)
- Pyrausta caenalis Hampson, 1900
- Pyrausta castalis Treitschke, 1829
- Pyrausta chrysitis Butler, 1881
- Pyrausta chrysopygalis (Staudinger, 1900)
- Pyrausta cingulata (Linnaeus, 1758)
- Pyrausta clausalis (Christoph, 1881)
- Pyrausta curvalis Leech, 1889
- Pyrausta despicata (Scopoli, 1763)
- Pyrausta elwesi (Staudinger, 1900)
- Pyrausta extinctalis (Christoph, 1881)
- Pyrausta falcatalis Guenée, 1854
- Pyrausta fibulalis (Christoph, 1881)
- Pyrausta furvicoloralis Hampson, 1900
- Pyrausta fuscobrunnealis (South, 1901)
- Pyrausta graeseri (Staudinger, 1892)
- Pyrausta limbata (Butler, 1879)
- Pyrausta limbopunctalis (Herrich-Schäffer, 1849)
- Pyrausta mutuurai Inoue, 1982
- Pyrausta nigrata (ScopoIi, 1763)
- Pyrausta noctualis Yamanaka, 1978
- Pyrausta obfuscata (ScopoIi, 1763)
- Pyrausta odontogrammalis Caradja, 1925
- Pyrausta ostrinalis (Hübner, 1796)
- Pyrausta porphyralis ([Denis & Schiffermüller], 1775)
- Pyrausta pseudosanguinalis Kirpichnikova, 1984
- Pyrausta pullatalis (Christoph, 1881)
- Pyrausta purpuralis (Linnaeus, 1758)
- Pyrausta sanguinalis (Linnaeus, 1767)
- Pyrausta solemnalis (Christoph, 1881)
- Pyrausta tendinosalis Bremer, 1864
- Pyrausta tithonialis Zeller, 1872
- Reskovitsia alborivulalis (Eversmann, 1843)
- Schoenobius gigantellus ([Denis & Schiffermüller], 1775)
- Schoenobius sasakii Inoue, 1982
- Scirpophaga incertulas (Walker, 1863)
- Scirpophaga praelata (Scopoli, 1763)
- Scirpophaga xanthopygata Schawerda, 1922
- Sclerocona acutellus (Eversmann, 1842)
- Scoparia ambigualis (Treitschke, 1829)
- Scoparia ancipitella (La Harpe, 1855)
- Scoparia basistrigalis Knaggs, 1866
- Scoparia conicella (La Harpe, 1863)
- Scoparia ingratella (Zeller, 1846)
- Scoparia isochroalis Hampson, 1907
- Scoparia mandschurica Christoph, 1881
- Scoparia manifestella (Herrich-Schäffer, 1848)
- Scoparia nipponalis Inoue, 1982
- Scoparia perplexella (Zeller, 1839)
- Scoparia pyralella ([Denis & Schiffermüller], 1775)
- Scoparia subfusca Haworth, 1811
- Scoparia x-signata (Filipjev, 1927)
- Scoparia yamanakai Inoue, 1982
- Sinibotys evenoralis (Walker, 1859)
- Sitochroa palealis ([Denis & Schiffermüller], 1775)
- Sitochroa umbrosalis (Warren, 1892)
- Sitochroa verticalis (Linnaeus, 1758)
- Spoladea recurvalis (Fabricius, 1775)
- Stiphrometasia monialis (Erschoff, 1872)
- Syllepte fuscomarginalis (Leech, 1889)
- Syllepte segnalis (Leech, 1889)
- Tabidia strigiferalis Hampson, 1900
- Talanga quadrimaculalis (Bremer & Grey, 1853)
- Talis chamylella Staudinger, 1900
- Talis evidens Kosakevitsh, 1979
- Talis menetriesi Hampson, 1900
- Talis mongolica Błeszyński, 1965
- Talis povolnyi Roesler, 1975
- Talis pulcherrimus (Staudinger, 1870)
- Talis quercella ([Denis & Schiffermüller], 1775)
- Talis wockei Filipjev, 1929
- Tegostoma comparalis (Hübner, 1796)
- Tenerobotys teneralis (Caradja, 1939)
- Thisanotia chrysonuchella (Scopoli, 1763)
- Thopeutis galleriellus (Ragonot, 1892)
- Titanio normalis (Hllbner, 1796)
- Titanio originalis (Herrich-Schäffer, 1860)
- Trichophysetis cretacea (Butler, 1879)
- Trichophysetis rufoterminalis (Christoph, 1881)
- Udea accolalis (Zeller, 1867)
- Udea affinialis (Zerny, 1914)
- Udea alaskalis (Gibson, 1920)
- Udea alpinalis (Denis & Schiffermüller, 1775)
- Udea austriacalis (Herrich-Schäffer, 1851)
- Udea bipunctalis (Herrich-Schäffer, 1851)
- Udea caliginosalis (Ragonot, 1894)
- Udea costalis (Eversmann, 1852)
- Udea cretacea (Filipjev, 1925)
- Udea cyanalis (La Harpe, 1855)
- Udea decrepitalis (Herrich-Schäffer, 1848)
- Udea elutalis (Denis & Schiffermüller), 1775)
- Udea exigualis (Wileman, 1911)
- Udea ferrugalis (Hübner, 1796)
- Udea fimbriatralis (Duponche1, 1834)
- Udea fulvalis (Hübner, 1809)
- Udea hamalis (Thunberg, 1788)
- Udea inquinatalis (Lienig & Zeller, 1846)
- Udea institalis (Hübner, [1819])
- Udea itysalis Walker, 1859
- Udea kusnezovi Sinev, 2008
- Udea languidalis (Eversmann, 1842)
- Udea latipennalis (Caradja, 1928)
- Udea lugubralis Leech, 1889
- Udea lutealis (Hübner, [1809])
- Udea nebulalis (Hübner, 1796)
- Udea ochreocapitalis (Ragonot, 1894)
- Udea olivalis ([Denis & Schiffermüller], 1775)
- Udea orbicentralis (Christoph, 1881)
- Udea prunalis ([Denis & Schiffermüller], 1775)
- Udea rhabdalis Hampson, 1900
- Udea stationalis Yamanaka, 1988
- Udea stigmatalis (Wileman, 1911)
- Udea sviridovi Bolshakov, 2002
- Udea torvalis Moschler, 1864
- Udea tritalis (Christoph, 1881)
- Udea uliginosalis (Stephens, 1834)
- Udea washingtonalis Grote, 1881
- Udonomeiga vicinalis (South, 1901)
- Uresiphita gilvata (Fabricius, 1794)
- Xanthocrambus argentarius (Staudinger, 1867)
- Xanthocrambus delicatellus (Zeller, 1863)
- Xanthocrambus lucellus (Herrich-Schäffer, 1848)
- Xanthocrambus saxonellus (Zincken, 1821)
- Xanthopsamma aurantialis Munroe & Mutuura, 1968

== Cimelioidea ==
=== Cimeliidae ===
- Axia olga (Staudinger, 1899)

== Calliduloidae ==
=== Callidulidae ===
- Pterodecta felderi (Bremer, 1864)

== Drepanoidea ==
=== Epicopeiidae ===
- Epicopeia mencia Moore, 1874
- Nossa palaearctica (Staudinger, 1887)

=== Thyatiridae ===
- Achlya flavicornis (Linnaeus, 1758)
- Achlya hoerburgeri (Schawerda, 1924)
- Achlya longipennis Inoue, 1972
- Epipsestis nikkoensis (Matsumura, 1921)
- Epipsestis obscurata Tshistjakov, [1988]
- Epipsestis ornata (Leech, [1889])
- Epipsestis perornata Inoue, 1972
- Habrosyne dieckmanni (Graeser, 1888)
- Habrosyne intermedia (Bremer, 1864)
- Habrosyne pyritoides (Hufnagel, 1766)
- Macrothyatira flavida (Butler, 1885)
- Neodaruma tamanuki Matsumura, 1933
- Neoploca arctipennis (Butler, 1878)
- Nothoploca nigripunctata (Warren, 1915)
- Ochropacha duplaris (Linnaeus, 1761)
- Parapsestis argenteopicta (Oberthiir, 1879)
- Polyploca ridens (Fabricius, 1787)
- Shinploca shini Kim Sung Soo, 1985
- Tethea albicostata (Bremer, 1861)
- Tethea ampliata (Butler, 1878)
- Tethea consimilis (Warren, 1912)
- Tethea octogesima (Butler, 1878)
- Tethea ocularis (Linnaeus, 1767)
- Tethea or ([Denis & Schiffermüller], 1775)
- Tethea trifolium (Alphéraky, 1895)
- Tetheella fluctuosa (Hübner, [1803])
- Thyatira batis (Linnaeus, 1758)
- Togaria suzukiana Matsumura, 1921
- Togaria tancrei (Graeser, 1888)

=== Drepanidae ===
- Agnidra scabiosa (Butler, 1877)
- Auzata superba (Butler, 1878)
- Callidrepana palleola (Motschulsky, 1866)
- Cilix asiatica Bang-Haas, 1907
- Cilix filipjevi Kardakoff, 1928
- Cilix glaucata (Scopoli, 1763)
- Ditrigona komarovi (Kurentzov, 1935)
- Drepana curvatula (Borkhausen, 1790)
- Drepana falcataria (Linnaeus, 1758)
- Falcaria lacertinaria (Linnaeus, 1758)
- Nordstromia grisearia (Staudinger, 1892)
- Nordstromia japonica (Moore, 1877)
- Oreta pulchripes Butler, 1877
- Pseudalbara parvula (Leech, 1890)
- Sabra harpagula (Esper, [1786])
- Watsonalla binaria (Hufnagel, 1767)
