= Pediasia strenua =

Scientific classification
- Kingdom: Animalia
- Phylum: Arthropoda
- Clade: Pancrustacea
- Class: Insecta
- Order: Lepidoptera
- Family: Crambidae
- Genus: Pediasia
- Species: P. strenua

Binomial name
- Pediasia strenua Bassi, 1992

Species of moth

Pediasia strenua is a moth in the family Crambidae. It was described by Graziano Bassi in 1992. It is found in Cape Verde.
