= Pediasia abnaki =

Scientific classification
- Kingdom: Animalia
- Phylum: Arthropoda
- Clade: Pancrustacea
- Class: Insecta
- Order: Lepidoptera
- Family: Crambidae
- Genus: Pediasia
- Species: P. abnaki

Binomial name
- Pediasia abnaki (Klots, 1942)

Synonyms
- Crambus abnaki Klots, 1942

Species of moth

Pediasia abnaki is a moth in the family Crambidae. It was described by Alexander Barrett Klots in 1942. It is found in North America, where it has been recorded from Maine, Michigan, Nova Scotia, Ohio, Alberta, Quebec, Ontario and New Brunswick. The habitat consists of grasslands. Adults have been recorded on wing from June to August.

The larvae probably feed on the roots of grasses.
