= Pediasia ochristrigella =

Scientific classification
- Kingdom: Animalia
- Phylum: Arthropoda
- Clade: Pancrustacea
- Class: Insecta
- Order: Lepidoptera
- Family: Crambidae
- Genus: Pediasia
- Species: P. ochristrigella

Binomial name
- Pediasia ochristrigella (Hampson, 1896)

Synonyms
- Crambus ochristrigella Hampson, 1896; Pediasia ochristrigellus; Crambus dumontellus Hartig, 1953

Species of moth

Pediasia ochristrigella is a moth in the family Crambidae. It was described by George Hampson in 1896. It is found in the Punjab of what was British India, western Pakistan, Tunisia and Sri Lanka.

== Description ==
The wingspan is about 14–22 mm. Forewings with vein 11 becoming coincident with vein 12. Hindwings and often the forewings with veins 4 and 5 stalked. An ochreous moth. Forewings with interspaces irrorated (sprinkled) with fuscous scales, forming obscure streaks from base to beyond middle and obscure postmedial and submarginal series of short streaks. Two dark specks found on the margin below middle. Hindwings ochreous white.
