= Pediasia abbreviatellus =

Scientific classification
- Kingdom: Animalia
- Phylum: Arthropoda
- Clade: Pancrustacea
- Class: Insecta
- Order: Lepidoptera
- Family: Crambidae
- Genus: Pediasia
- Species: P. abbreviatellus

Binomial name
- Pediasia abbreviatellus (Walker, 1866)

Synonyms
- Crambus abbreviatellus Walker, 1866

Species of moth

Pediasia abbreviatellus is a moth in the family Crambidae. It was described by Francis Walker in 1866. It is found in India.
