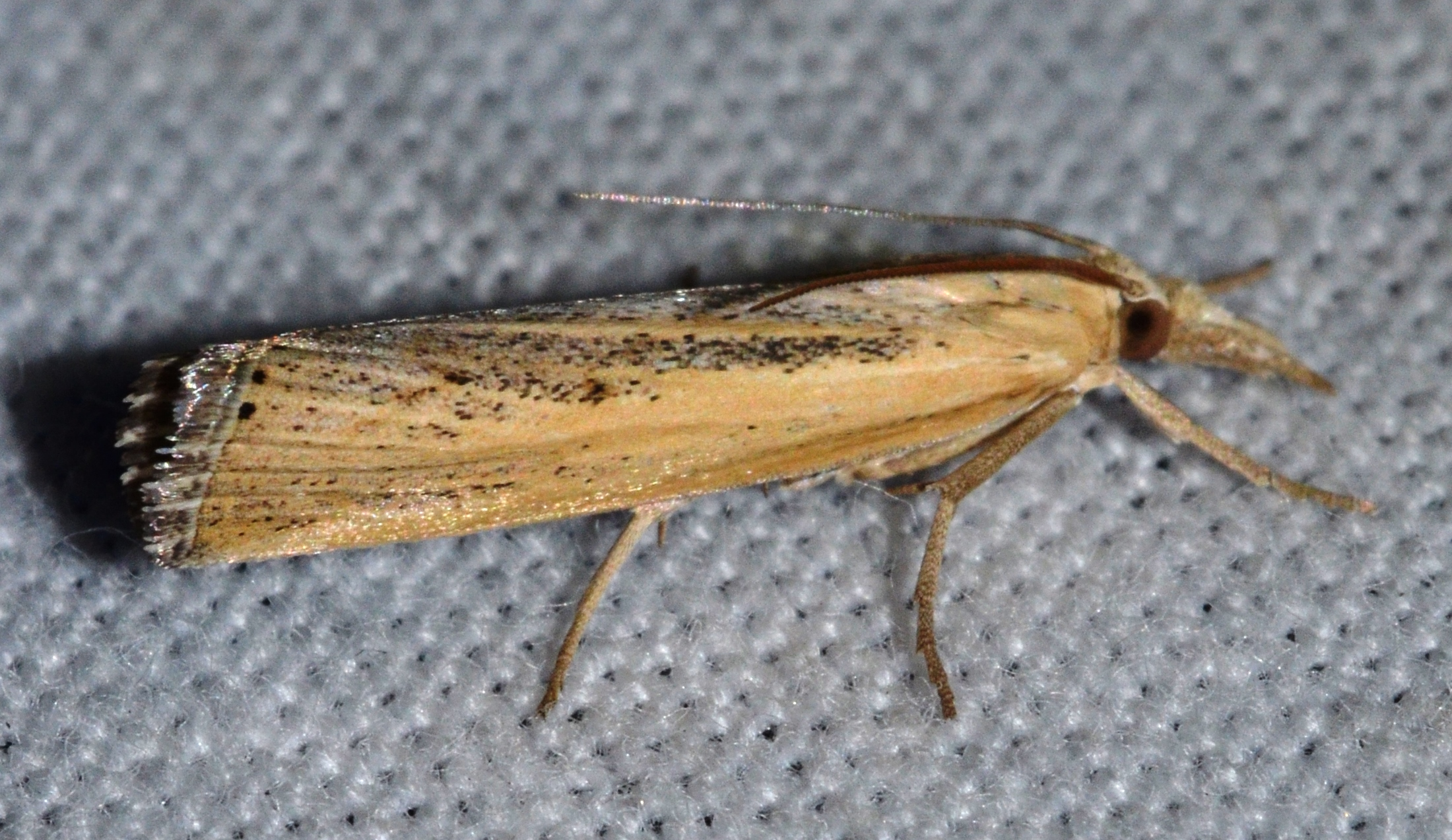

Scientific classification
- Kingdom: Animalia
- Phylum: Arthropoda
- Clade: Pancrustacea
- Class: Insecta
- Order: Lepidoptera
- Family: Crambidae
- Genus: Pediasia
- Species: P. dorsipunctella

Binomial name
- Pediasia dorsipunctella (Kearfott, 1908)

Synonyms
- Crambus dorsipunctella Kearfott, 1908; Pediasia dorsipunctellus; Crambus geminatellus Zeller, 1863

= Pediasia dorsipunctella =

Species of moth

Pediasia dorsipunctella is a moth in the family Crambidae. It was described by William D. Kearfott in 1908. It is found in North America, where it has been recorded from Alberta, Arizona, California, Manitoba, Montana, Nevada, North Dakota and Ontario. The habitat consists of grasslands.

The wingspan is 24–28 mm.
