= Pediasia ramexita =

Scientific classification
- Kingdom: Animalia
- Phylum: Arthropoda
- Clade: Pancrustacea
- Class: Insecta
- Order: Lepidoptera
- Family: Crambidae
- Genus: Pediasia
- Species: P. ramexita

Binomial name
- Pediasia ramexita Błeszyński, 1965

Species of moth

Pediasia ramexita is a moth in the family Crambidae. It was described by Stanisław Błeszyński in 1965. It is found in Tibet, China.
