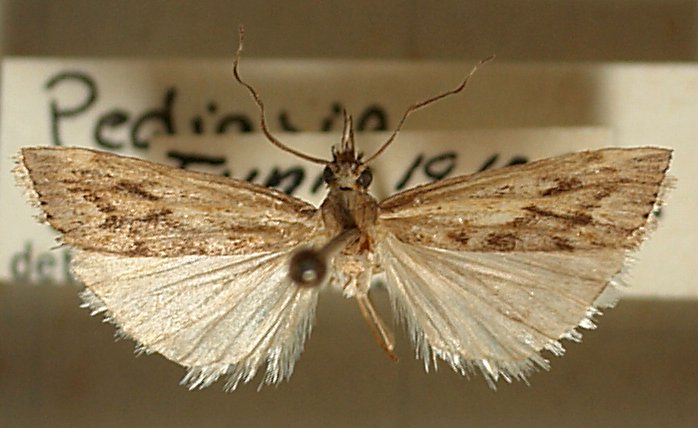

Scientific classification
- Kingdom: Animalia
- Phylum: Arthropoda
- Clade: Pancrustacea
- Class: Insecta
- Order: Lepidoptera
- Family: Crambidae
- Genus: Pediasia
- Species: P. siculella

Binomial name
- Pediasia siculella (Duponchel, 1836)

Synonyms
- Pediasia siculellus; Crambus siculellus Duponchel, 1836; Crambus subdesertellus Chrétien in Oberthür, 1922; Crambus suldesertellus Chrétien, 1922; Crambus mariaeludovicae Daniel Lucas, 1935

= Pediasia siculella =

Species of moth

Pediasia siculella is a species of moth of the family Crambidae described by Philogène Auguste Joseph Duponchel in 1836. It is found in Sicily, Malta, Spain, Tunisia and Morocco.
