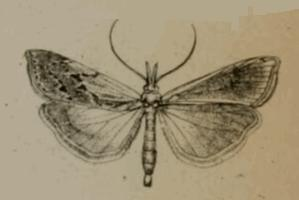

Scientific classification
- Kingdom: Animalia
- Phylum: Arthropoda
- Clade: Pancrustacea
- Class: Insecta
- Order: Lepidoptera
- Family: Crambidae
- Genus: Pediasia
- Species: P. desertellus

Binomial name
- Pediasia desertellus (Lederer, 1855)

Synonyms
- Crambus desertellus Lederer, 1855; Pediasia desertella

= Pediasia desertellus =

Species of moth

Pediasia desertellus is a species of moth in the family Crambidae described by Julius Lederer in 1855. It is found in Portugal and on Sicily, as well as in Mauritania, Algeria, Israel, Jordan, Asia Minor, Lebanon, Syria, Iraq, Uganda and Iran.
