= Pediasia niobe =

Scientific classification
- Kingdom: Animalia
- Phylum: Arthropoda
- Clade: Pancrustacea
- Class: Insecta
- Order: Lepidoptera
- Family: Crambidae
- Genus: Pediasia
- Species: P. niobe

Binomial name
- Pediasia niobe Błeszyński, 1962

Species of moth

Pediasia niobe is a moth in the family Crambidae. It was described by Stanisław Błeszyński in 1962. It is found in Kenya.
