= Pediasia cistites =

Scientific classification
- Kingdom: Animalia
- Phylum: Arthropoda
- Clade: Pancrustacea
- Class: Insecta
- Order: Lepidoptera
- Family: Crambidae
- Genus: Pediasia
- Species: P. cistites

Binomial name
- Pediasia cistites (Meyrick, 1934)

Synonyms
- Crambus cistites Meyrick, 1934

Species of moth

Pediasia cistites is a moth in the family Crambidae. It was described by Edward Meyrick in 1934. It is found in the Democratic Republic of the Congo.
