= Pediasia roesleri =

Scientific classification
- Kingdom: Animalia
- Phylum: Arthropoda
- Clade: Pancrustacea
- Class: Insecta
- Order: Lepidoptera
- Family: Crambidae
- Genus: Pediasia
- Species: P. roesleri

Binomial name
- Pediasia roesleri Błeszyński, 1969

Species of moth

Pediasia roesleri is a moth in the family Crambidae. It was described by Stanisław Błeszyński in 1969. It is found in the Punjab of what is now Pakistan and India.
