= Pediasia batangensis =

Scientific classification
- Kingdom: Animalia
- Phylum: Arthropoda
- Clade: Pancrustacea
- Class: Insecta
- Order: Lepidoptera
- Family: Crambidae
- Genus: Pediasia
- Species: P. batangensis

Binomial name
- Pediasia batangensis (Caradja, 1939)

Synonyms
- Crambus batangensis Caradja, 1939

Species of moth

Pediasia batangensis is a moth in the family Crambidae. It was described by Aristide Caradja in 1939. It is found in Xizang, China.
