= Pediasia ericella =

Scientific classification
- Kingdom: Animalia
- Phylum: Arthropoda
- Clade: Pancrustacea
- Class: Insecta
- Order: Lepidoptera
- Family: Crambidae
- Genus: Pediasia
- Species: P. ericella

Binomial name
- Pediasia ericella (Barnes & McDunnough, 1918)

Synonyms
- Crambus ericella Barnes & McDunnough, 1918; Pediasia ericellus

Species of moth

Pediasia ericella is a moth in the family Crambidae. It was described by William Barnes and James Halliday McDunnough in 1918. It is found in North America, where it has been recorded from California and Alberta. The habitat consists of prairies and aspen parklands.

The wingspan is 24–27 mm for males and 19–25 mm for females.

The larvae probably feed on the roots of grasses.
