= Pediasia torikurai =

Scientific classification
- Kingdom: Animalia
- Phylum: Arthropoda
- Clade: Pancrustacea
- Class: Insecta
- Order: Lepidoptera
- Family: Crambidae
- Genus: Pediasia
- Species: P. torikurai

Binomial name
- Pediasia torikurai Sasaki, 2011

Species of moth

Pediasia torikurai is a moth in the family Crambidae. It was described by Sasaki in 2011. It is found in Japan (Hokkaido).
