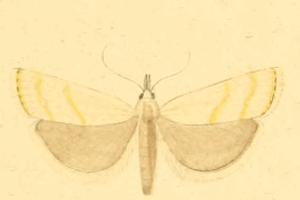

Scientific classification
- Kingdom: Animalia
- Phylum: Arthropoda
- Clade: Pancrustacea
- Class: Insecta
- Order: Lepidoptera
- Family: Crambidae
- Genus: Pediasia
- Species: P. subflavellus

Binomial name
- Pediasia subflavellus (Duponchel, 1836)

Synonyms
- Crambus subflavellus Duponchel, 1836; Pediasia subflavella

= Pediasia subflavellus =

Species of moth

Pediasia subflavellus is a species of moth in the family Crambidae described by Philogène Auguste Joseph Duponchel in 1836. It is found on Corsica.
