= Pediasia fulvitinctellus =

Scientific classification
- Kingdom: Animalia
- Phylum: Arthropoda
- Clade: Pancrustacea
- Class: Insecta
- Order: Lepidoptera
- Family: Crambidae
- Genus: Pediasia
- Species: P. fulvitinctellus

Binomial name
- Pediasia fulvitinctellus (Hampson, 1896)

Synonyms
- Crambus fulvitinctellus Hampson, 1896

Species of moth

Pediasia fulvitinctellus is a moth in the family Crambidae. It was described by George Hampson in 1896. It is found in South Africa.
