= Pediasia figuratellus =

Scientific classification
- Kingdom: Animalia
- Phylum: Arthropoda
- Clade: Pancrustacea
- Class: Insecta
- Order: Lepidoptera
- Family: Crambidae
- Genus: Pediasia
- Species: P. figuratellus

Binomial name
- Pediasia figuratellus (Walker, 1866)

Synonyms
- Crambus figuratellus Walker, 1866

Species of moth

Pediasia figuratellus is a moth in the family Crambidae. It was described by Francis Walker in 1866. It is found in South Africa.
