= Pediasia melanerges =

Scientific classification
- Kingdom: Animalia
- Phylum: Arthropoda
- Clade: Pancrustacea
- Class: Insecta
- Order: Lepidoptera
- Family: Crambidae
- Genus: Pediasia
- Species: P. melanerges

Binomial name
- Pediasia melanerges (Hampson, 1919)

Synonyms
- Crambus melanerges Hampson, 1919

Species of moth

Pediasia melanerges is a moth in the family Crambidae. It was described by George Hampson in 1919. It is found in Uganda and Sierra Leone.
