= Pediasia paraniobe =

Scientific classification
- Kingdom: Animalia
- Phylum: Arthropoda
- Clade: Pancrustacea
- Class: Insecta
- Order: Lepidoptera
- Family: Crambidae
- Genus: Pediasia
- Species: P. paraniobe

Binomial name
- Pediasia paraniobe Błeszyński, 1969

Species of moth

Pediasia paraniobe is a moth in the family Crambidae. It was described by Stanisław Błeszyński in 1969. It is found in Angola.
