= Pediasia ematheudellus =

Scientific classification
- Kingdom: Animalia
- Phylum: Arthropoda
- Clade: Pancrustacea
- Class: Insecta
- Order: Lepidoptera
- Family: Crambidae
- Genus: Pediasia
- Species: P. ematheudellus

Binomial name
- Pediasia ematheudellus (de Joannis, 1927)

Synonyms
- Crambus ematheudellus de Joannis, 1927; Pediasia marionella Błeszyński, 1963; Pediasia marioniella Błeszyński, 1963

Species of moth

Pediasia ematheudellus is a moth in the family Crambidae. It was described by Joseph de Joannis in 1927. It is found in Mozambique and Madagascar.
