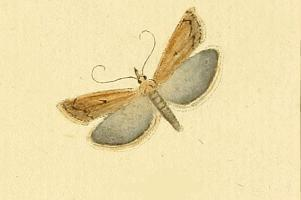

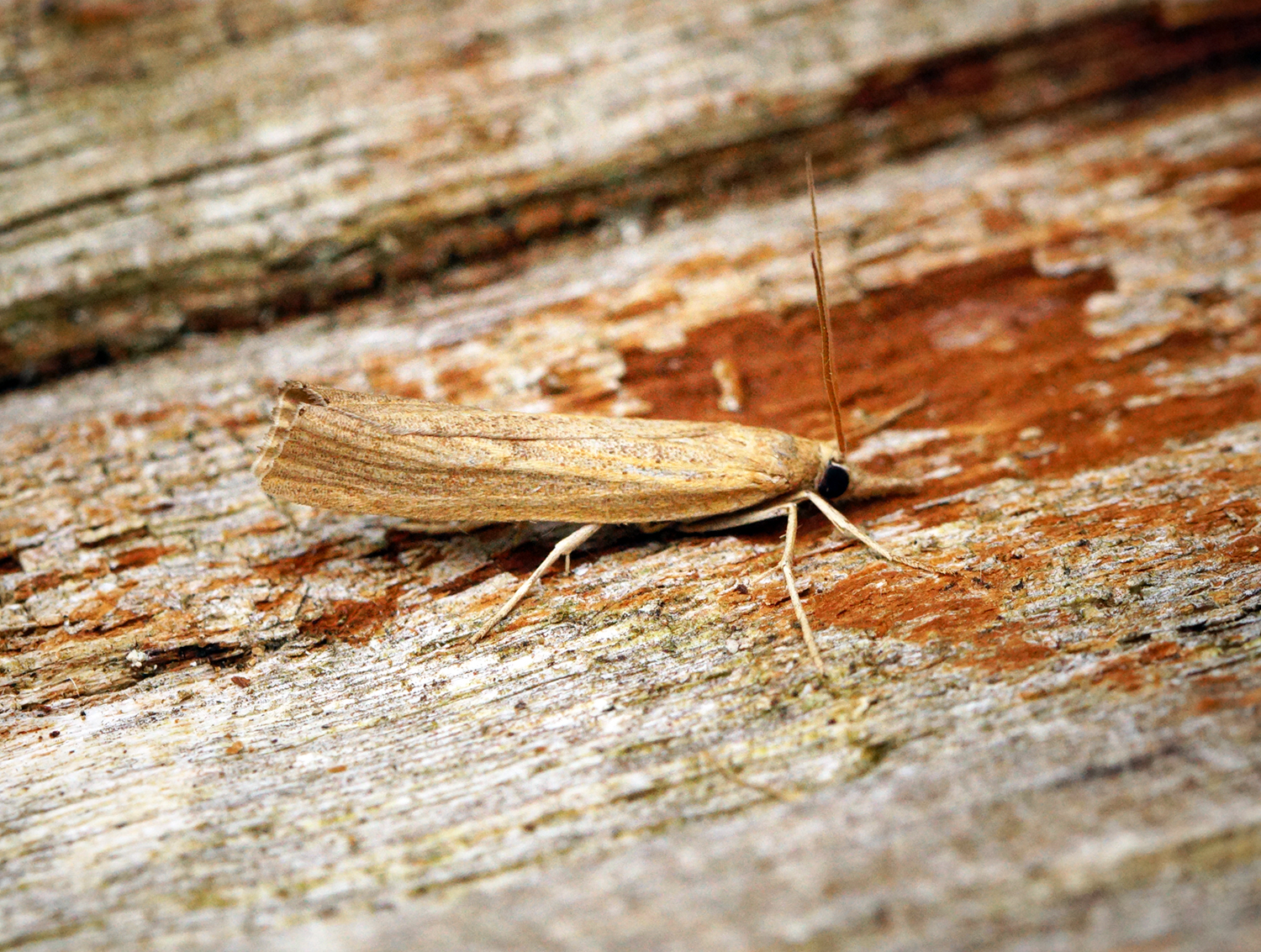

Scientific classification
- Kingdom: Animalia
- Phylum: Arthropoda
- Clade: Pancrustacea
- Class: Insecta
- Order: Lepidoptera
- Family: Crambidae
- Genus: Pediasia
- Species: P. contaminella

Binomial name
- Pediasia contaminella (Hubner, 1796)

Synonyms
- Tinea contaminella Hubner, 1796; Tinea contaminalis Hübner, [1825]; Crambus cantiellus Tutt, 1886; Crambus contaminellus ab. fumosellus Caradja, 1931; Crambus contaminellus f. sticheli Costantini, 1922; Crambus contaminellus f. vernellus Turati, 1922; Pediasia squalidalis Hübner, 1816

= Pediasia contaminella =

Species of moth

Pediasia contaminella is a species of moth in the family Crambidae described by Jacob Hübner in 1796. It is found in almost all of Europe, Asia Minor, the Caucasus, Transcaucasia, Iraq, Iran, the Kopet Dagh and Minusinsk.

The wingspan is 17–19 mm. It differs from Pediasia aridella as follows : forewings without blackish submediaii streak from base, median line less oblique, with more strongly marked discal indentation, nearly parallel to second.

Adults are on wing in July and August.

The larvae feed on Poa species (including Poa maritima and Poa borreri) and Festuca ovina. They live in a silken tube.
