= Pediasia ribbeellus =

Scientific classification
- Kingdom: Animalia
- Phylum: Arthropoda
- Clade: Pancrustacea
- Class: Insecta
- Order: Lepidoptera
- Family: Crambidae
- Genus: Pediasia
- Species: P. ribbeellus

Binomial name
- Pediasia ribbeellus (Caradja, 1910)

Synonyms
- Crambus tristellus var. ribbeellus Caradja, 1910; Pediasia ribbeella; Crambus escalerellus Schmidt, 1933; Pediasia bulloni Agenjo, 1975

Species of moth

Pediasia ribbeellus is a species of moth in the family Crambidae described by Aristide Caradja in 1910. It is found in Spain and Portugal.
