= Pediasia lidiella =

Scientific classification
- Kingdom: Animalia
- Phylum: Arthropoda
- Clade: Pancrustacea
- Class: Insecta
- Order: Lepidoptera
- Family: Crambidae
- Genus: Pediasia
- Species: P. lidiella

Binomial name
- Pediasia lidiella Streltzov & Ustjuzhanin, 2009

Species of moth

Pediasia lidiella is a moth in the family Crambidae. It was described by Alexander N. Streltzov and Petr Ya. Ustjuzhanin in 2009. It is found in Russia, where it has been recorded from Transbaikalia.
