= Pediasia browerella =

Scientific classification
- Kingdom: Animalia
- Phylum: Arthropoda
- Clade: Pancrustacea
- Class: Insecta
- Order: Lepidoptera
- Family: Crambidae
- Genus: Pediasia
- Species: P. browerella

Binomial name
- Pediasia browerella (Klots, 1942)

Synonyms
- Crambus browerella Klots, 1942; Pediasia browerellus; Crambus browerellus katahdini Klots, 1942

Species of moth

Pediasia browerella is a moth in the family Crambidae. It was described by Alexander Barrett Klots in 1942. It is found in North America, where it has been recorded from Colorado, Maine, Manitoba and Nunavut.

The wingspan is about 22 mm. Adults are on wing from June to July.
