= Pediasia bizonellus =

Scientific classification
- Kingdom: Animalia
- Phylum: Arthropoda
- Clade: Pancrustacea
- Class: Insecta
- Order: Lepidoptera
- Family: Crambidae
- Genus: Pediasia
- Species: P. bizonellus

Binomial name
- Pediasia bizonellus (Hampson, 1896)

Synonyms
- Crambus bizonellus Hampson, 1896

Species of moth

Pediasia bizonellus is a moth in the family Crambidae. It was described by George Hampson in 1896. It is found in Chile.
