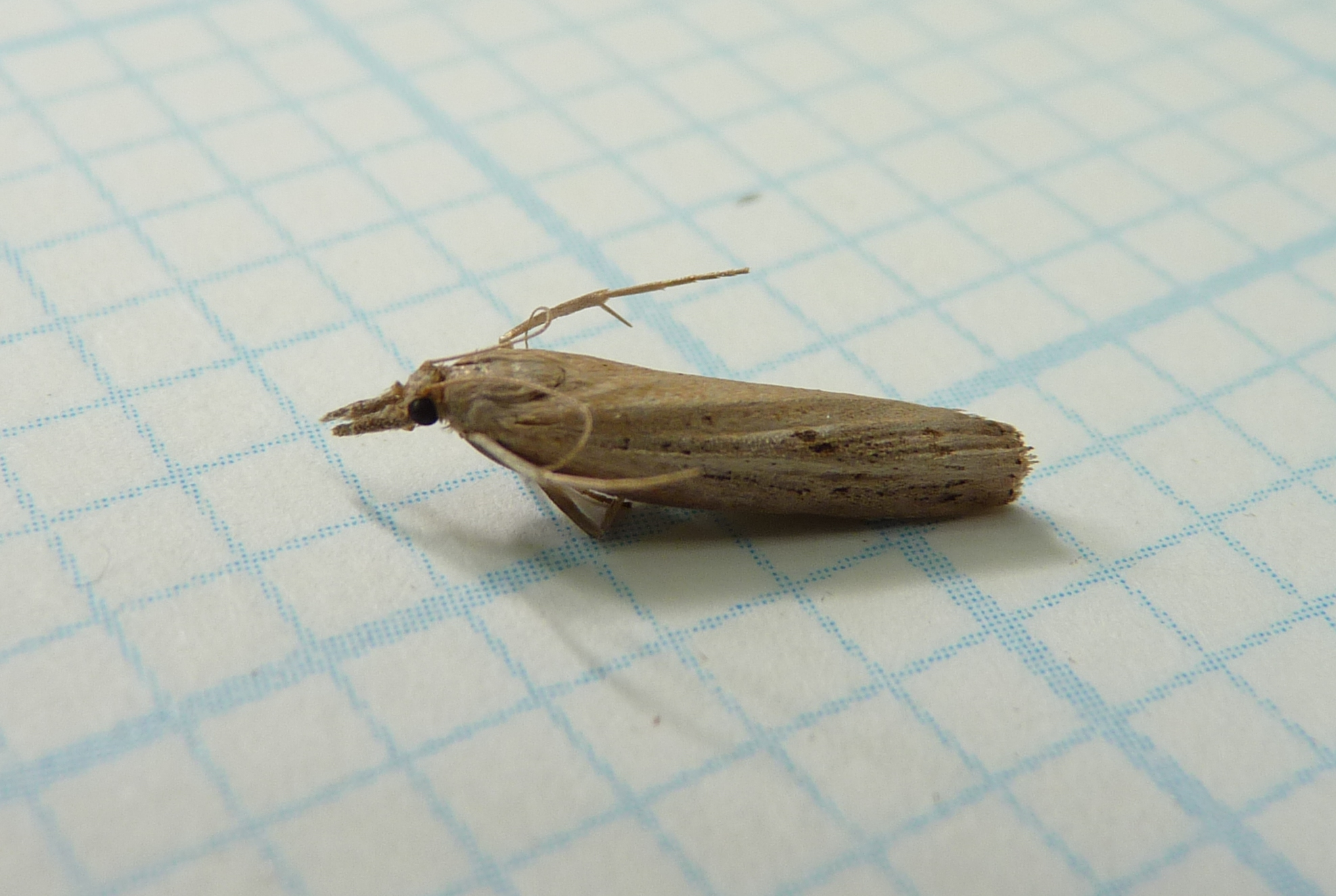

Scientific classification
- Kingdom: Animalia
- Phylum: Arthropoda
- Clade: Pancrustacea
- Class: Insecta
- Order: Lepidoptera
- Family: Crambidae
- Genus: Pediasia
- Species: P. trisecta

Binomial name
- Pediasia trisecta (Walker, 1856)

Synonyms
- Carvanca trisecta Walker, 1856; Crambus biliturellus Zeller, 1874; Crambus exsiccatus Zeller, 1863; Crambus interminellus Walker, 1863; Crambus fuscisquamellus Zeller, 1863

= Pediasia trisecta =

Species of moth

Pediasia trisecta, the large sod webworm or greater sod webworm, is a moth of the family Crambidae. It is found in the United States and southern Canada.

The wingspan is 23–33 mm. Adults are on wing from May to October. Adults feed solely on dew.

The larvae feed on various Poaceae species.
