= Pediasia wittei =

Scientific classification
- Kingdom: Animalia
- Phylum: Arthropoda
- Clade: Pancrustacea
- Class: Insecta
- Order: Lepidoptera
- Family: Crambidae
- Genus: Pediasia
- Species: P. wittei

Binomial name
- Pediasia wittei Błeszyński, 1969

Species of moth

Pediasia wittei is a moth in the family Crambidae. It was described by Stanisław Błeszyński in 1969. It is found in Yemen.
