= Pediasia hispanica =

Scientific classification
- Kingdom: Animalia
- Phylum: Arthropoda
- Clade: Pancrustacea
- Class: Insecta
- Order: Lepidoptera
- Family: Crambidae
- Genus: Pediasia
- Species: P. hispanica

Binomial name
- Pediasia hispanica Bleszynski, 1956

Species of moth

Pediasia hispanica is a species of moth in the family Crambidae. It is found in Portugal and Spain.

The length of the forewings is about 12 mm.
