= Pediasia serraticornis =

Scientific classification
- Kingdom: Animalia
- Phylum: Arthropoda
- Clade: Pancrustacea
- Class: Insecta
- Order: Lepidoptera
- Family: Crambidae
- Genus: Pediasia
- Species: P. serraticornis

Binomial name
- Pediasia serraticornis (Hampson, 1900)

Synonyms
- Crambus serraticornis Hampson, 1900; Crambus gracilellus Chrétien, 1910; Crambus gracilellus f. fusculellus Turati, 1924; Crambus gracilellus var. distinctellus Chrétien, 1910; Crambus gracilellus var. tenellus Chrétien, 1917; Crambus ochrosignellus Chrétien, 1915

Species of moth

Pediasia serraticornis is a species of moth in the family Crambidae described by George Hampson in 1900. It is found in Spain, Algeria, Tunisia, Libya, Jordan, Syria and Israel.

The wingspan is about 22 mm. Adults are pale grey, slightly tinged with brown. There are some black scales near the base of the inner margin of the forewings. The hindwings have an obscure fuscous terminal band.
