= Pediasia palmitiella =

Scientific classification
- Kingdom: Animalia
- Phylum: Arthropoda
- Clade: Pancrustacea
- Class: Insecta
- Order: Lepidoptera
- Family: Crambidae
- Genus: Pediasia
- Species: P. palmitiella

Binomial name
- Pediasia palmitiella (Chrétien, 1915)

Synonyms
- Crambus palmitiella Chrétien, 1915; Pediasia palmitiellus

Species of moth

Pediasia palmitiella is a moth in the family Crambidae. It was described by Pierre Chrétien in 1915. It is found in Morocco and Algeria.
