= Pediasia nephelostictus =

Scientific classification
- Kingdom: Animalia
- Phylum: Arthropoda
- Clade: Pancrustacea
- Class: Insecta
- Order: Lepidoptera
- Family: Crambidae
- Genus: Pediasia
- Species: P. nephelostictus

Binomial name
- Pediasia nephelostictus (de Joannis, 1927)

Synonyms
- Crambus nephelostictus de Joannis, 1927

Species of moth

Pediasia nephelostictus is a moth in the family Crambidae. It was described by Joseph de Joannis in 1927. It is found in Mozambique.
