= Pediasia ferruginea =

Scientific classification
- Kingdom: Animalia
- Phylum: Arthropoda
- Clade: Pancrustacea
- Class: Insecta
- Order: Lepidoptera
- Family: Crambidae
- Genus: Pediasia
- Species: P. ferruginea

Binomial name
- Pediasia ferruginea Błeszyński, 1963

Species of moth

Pediasia ferruginea is a moth in the family Crambidae. It was described by Stanisław Błeszyński in 1963. It is found in Ethiopia.
