= Pediasia rotundiprojecta =

Scientific classification
- Kingdom: Animalia
- Phylum: Arthropoda
- Clade: Pancrustacea
- Class: Insecta
- Order: Lepidoptera
- Family: Crambidae
- Genus: Pediasia
- Species: P. rotundiprojecta

Binomial name
- Pediasia rotundiprojecta W. Li & H. Li, 2011

Species of moth

Pediasia rotundiprojecta is a moth in the family Crambidae. It was described by W. Li and H. Li in 2011. It is found in China (Tibet).
