= Pediasia bolivarellus =

Scientific classification
- Kingdom: Animalia
- Phylum: Arthropoda
- Clade: Pancrustacea
- Class: Insecta
- Order: Lepidoptera
- Family: Crambidae
- Genus: Pediasia
- Species: P. bolivarellus

Binomial name
- Pediasia bolivarellus (A. Schmidt, 1930)

Synonyms
- Crambus bolivarellus A. Schmidt, 1930; Pediasia bolivarella

Species of moth

Pediasia bolivarellus is a species of moth in the family Crambidae. It is found in Portugal and Spain.
