= Pediasia yangtseella =

Scientific classification
- Kingdom: Animalia
- Phylum: Arthropoda
- Clade: Pancrustacea
- Class: Insecta
- Order: Lepidoptera
- Family: Crambidae
- Genus: Pediasia
- Species: P. yangtseella

Binomial name
- Pediasia yangtseella (Caradja, 1939)

Synonyms
- Crambus yangtseella Caradja, 1939; Pediasia yangtseellus

Species of moth

Pediasia yangtseella is a moth in the family Crambidae. It was described by Aristide Caradja in 1939. It is found in Xizang and Yunnan in China.
