= Pediasia numidella =

Scientific classification
- Kingdom: Animalia
- Phylum: Arthropoda
- Clade: Pancrustacea
- Class: Insecta
- Order: Lepidoptera
- Family: Crambidae
- Genus: Pediasia
- Species: P. numidella

Binomial name
- Pediasia numidella (Rebel, 1903)

Synonyms
- Crambus numidella Rebel, 1903

Species of moth

Pediasia numidella is a moth in the family Crambidae. It was described by Hans Rebel in 1903. It is found in Algeria, Iran, Bahrein, Saudi Arabia, Kuwait and the United Arab Emirates.
