= Pediasia pudibundellus =

Scientific classification
- Kingdom: Animalia
- Phylum: Arthropoda
- Clade: Pancrustacea
- Class: Insecta
- Order: Lepidoptera
- Family: Crambidae
- Genus: Pediasia
- Species: P. pudibundellus

Binomial name
- Pediasia pudibundellus (Herrich-Schaffer, 1852)

Synonyms
- Crambus pudibundellus Herrich-Schäffer, 1852; Pediasia pudibundella

Species of moth

Pediasia pudibundellus is a species of moth in the family Crambidae described by Gottlieb August Wilhelm Herrich-Schäffer in 1852. It is found in southern Russia (Sarepta and Uralsk).
