= Pediasia alaica =

Scientific classification
- Kingdom: Animalia
- Phylum: Arthropoda
- Clade: Pancrustacea
- Class: Insecta
- Order: Lepidoptera
- Family: Crambidae
- Genus: Pediasia
- Species: P. alaica

Binomial name
- Pediasia alaica (Rebel, 1907)

Synonyms
- Crambus alaica Rebel, 1907; Crambus alaicus f. atrellus Caradja, 1910

Species of moth

Pediasia alaica is a moth in the family Crambidae. It was described by Hans Rebel in 1907. It is found in Central Asia, where it has been recorded from the Alai Mountains, the Pamir Mountains, the Tien-Shan Mountains and eastern Turkmenistan.
