= Pediasia bizonelloides =

Scientific classification
- Kingdom: Animalia
- Phylum: Arthropoda
- Clade: Pancrustacea
- Class: Insecta
- Order: Lepidoptera
- Family: Crambidae
- Genus: Pediasia
- Species: P. bizonelloides

Binomial name
- Pediasia bizonelloides Błeszyński, 1966

Species of moth

Pediasia bizonelloides is a moth in the family Crambidae. It was described by Stanisław Błeszyński in 1966. It is found in Chile.
