= Pediasia steppicolellus =

Scientific classification
- Kingdom: Animalia
- Phylum: Arthropoda
- Clade: Pancrustacea
- Class: Insecta
- Order: Lepidoptera
- Family: Crambidae
- Genus: Pediasia
- Species: P. steppicolellus

Binomial name
- Pediasia steppicolellus (Zerny, 1914)

Synonyms
- Crambus steppicolellus Zerny, 1914; Pediasia steppicolella

Species of moth

Pediasia steppicolellus is a species of moth in the family Crambidae described by Hans Zerny in 1914. It is found in Uralsk, Russia,

The length of the forewings is 8–9 mm.
