= Pediasia perselloides =

Scientific classification
- Kingdom: Animalia
- Phylum: Arthropoda
- Clade: Pancrustacea
- Class: Insecta
- Order: Lepidoptera
- Family: Crambidae
- Genus: Pediasia
- Species: P. perselloides

Binomial name
- Pediasia perselloides Song & Chen in Chen, Song & Yuan, 2004

Species of moth

Pediasia perselloides is a moth in the family Crambidae. It is found in China (Zhejiang).
