= Pediasia laciniella =

Scientific classification
- Kingdom: Animalia
- Phylum: Arthropoda
- Clade: Pancrustacea
- Class: Insecta
- Order: Lepidoptera
- Family: Crambidae
- Genus: Pediasia
- Species: P. laciniella

Binomial name
- Pediasia laciniella (Grote, 1880)

Synonyms
- Crambus laciniella Grote, 1880; Pediasia laciniellus

Species of moth

Pediasia laciniella is a moth in the family Crambidae. It was described by Augustus Radcliffe Grote in 1880. It is found in North America, where it has been recorded from Alberta, California, Illinois, Maine, Michigan, Quebec and Virginia.

The wingspan is about 27 mm. Adults are on wing from July to October.
