= Pediasia phrygius =

Scientific classification
- Kingdom: Animalia
- Phylum: Arthropoda
- Clade: Pancrustacea
- Class: Insecta
- Order: Lepidoptera
- Family: Crambidae
- Genus: Pediasia
- Species: P. phrygius

Binomial name
- Pediasia phrygius Fazekas, 1990

Species of moth

Pediasia phrygius is a moth in the family Crambidae. It is found in Turkey.
