= Pediasia lucrecia =

Scientific classification
- Kingdom: Animalia
- Phylum: Arthropoda
- Clade: Pancrustacea
- Class: Insecta
- Order: Lepidoptera
- Family: Crambidae
- Genus: Pediasia
- Species: P. lucrecia

Binomial name
- Pediasia lucrecia Błeszyński, 1969

Species of moth

Pediasia lucrecia is a moth in the family Crambidae. It was described by Stanisław Błeszyński in 1969. It is found in Zimbabwe.
