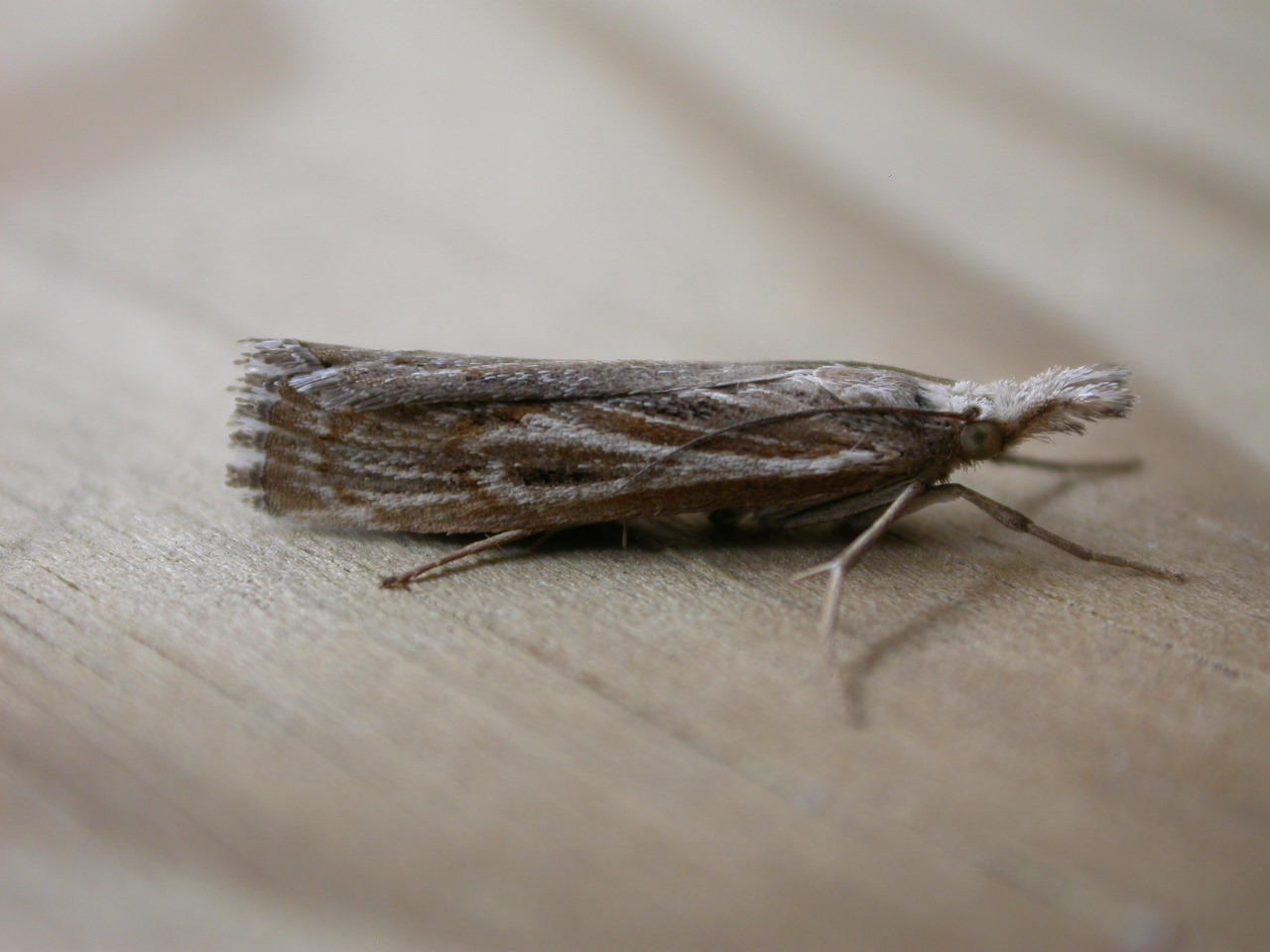
- Adult Pediasia fascelinella

Scientific classification
- Kingdom: Animalia
- Phylum: Arthropoda
- Clade: Pancrustacea
- Class: Insecta
- Order: Lepidoptera
- Family: Crambidae
- Tribe: Crambini
- Genus: Pediasia; Hübner, [1825]

Species
- Numerous, see text

Synonyms
- Carvanca Walker, 1856; Oseriates Fazekas, 1991; Pseudopediasia Ganev, 1987

= Pediasia =

Genus of moths

Pediasia is a genus of small moths in the family Crambidae. They are widespread across temperate Eurasia and adjacent regions.

Despite this genus being proposed as early as 1825, it was not widely recognized until the mid-20th century. Consequently, most species were initially placed in the closely related genus Crambus.

== Species ==
- Pediasia abbreviatellus (Walker, 1866)
- Pediasia abnaki (Klots, 1942)
- Pediasia alaica (Rebel, 1907)
- Pediasia alcmena Błeszyński, 1965
- Pediasia altaica (Staudinger, 1899)
- Pediasia amandusella Błeszyński, 1969
- Pediasia aridalis (Hampson, 1900)
- Pediasia aridella
- Pediasia aridelloides Błeszyński, 1965
- Pediasia batangensis (Caradja, 1939)
- Pediasia bizonelloides Błeszyński, 1966
- Pediasia bizonellus (Hampson, 1896)
- Pediasia bolivarella (Schmidt, 1930)
- Pediasia browerella (Klots, 1942)
- Pediasia cistites (Meyrick, 1934)
- Pediasia contaminella (Hübner, 1796)
- Pediasia desertella (Lederer, 1855)
- Pediasia dolicanthia
- Pediasia dorsipunctella (Kearfott, 1908)
- Pediasia echinulatia
- Pediasia ematheudellus (de Joannis, 1927)
- Pediasia epineura (Meyrick, 1883)
- Pediasia ericella (Barnes & McDunnough, 1918)
- Pediasia fascelinella
- Pediasia ferruginea Błeszyński, 1963
- Pediasia figuratellus (Walker, 1866)
- Pediasia fulvitinctellus (Hampson, 1896)
- Pediasia georgella Kosakjewitsch, 1978
- Pediasia gertlerae Błeszyński, 1969
- Pediasia gregori Roesler, 1975
- Pediasia gruberella Błeszyński, 1969
- Pediasia hispanica Błeszyński, 1956
- Pediasia huebneri Błeszyński, 1954
- Pediasia jecondica Błeszyński, 1965
- Pediasia jucundella (Herrich-Schäffer, [1847])
- Pediasia kuldjaensis (Caradja, 1916)
- Pediasia laciniella (Grote, 1880)
- Pediasia lederei Błeszyński, 1954
- Pediasia lidiella Streltzov & Ustjuzhanin, 2009
- Pediasia lucrecia Błeszyński, 1969
- Pediasia luteella (Denis & Schiffermüller, 1775)
- Pediasia matricella (Treitschke, 1832)
- Pediasia melanerges (Hampson, 1919)
- Pediasia mexicana Błeszyński, 1967
- Pediasia naumanni Błeszyński, 1969
- Pediasia nephelostictus (de Joannis, 1927)
- Pediasia niobe Błeszyński, 1962
- Pediasia numidella (Rebel, 1903)
- Pediasia ochristrigella (Hampson, 1896)
- Pediasia palmitiella (Chrétien, 1915)
- Pediasia paraniobe Błeszyński, 1969
- Pediasia pectinicornis (Rebel, 1910)
- Pediasia pedriolella (Duponchel, 1836)
- Pediasia persella (Toll, 1947)
- Pediasia perselloides
- Pediasia phrygius
- Pediasia pseudopersella Błeszyński, 1959
- Pediasia pudibundella (Herrich-Schäffer, [1852])
- Pediasia radicivitta (Filipjev, 1927)
- Pediasia ramexita Błeszyński, 1965
- Pediasia ribbeella (Caradja, 1910)
- Pediasia roesleri Błeszyński, 1969
- Pediasia rotundiprojecta W. Li & H. Li, 2011
- Pediasia sajanella (Caradja, 1925)
- Pediasia scolopendra Błeszyński, 1969
- Pediasia serraticornis (Hampson, 1900)
- Pediasia siculella
- Pediasia simiensis Błeszyński, 1962
- Pediasia steppicolella (Zerny, 1914)
- Pediasia strenua Bassi, 1992
- Pediasia subepineura Błeszyński, 1954
- Pediasia subflavella (Duponchel, 1836)
- Pediasia torikurai Sasaki, 2011
- Pediasia trisecta (Walker, 1856)
- Pediasia truncatella (Zetterstedt, 1839)
- Pediasia walkeri Błeszyński, 1962
- Pediasia wittei Błeszyński, 1969
- Pediasia yangtseella (Caradja, 1939)
- Pediasia zellerella (Staudinger, 1899)
