= Pediasia aridalis =

Scientific classification
- Kingdom: Animalia
- Phylum: Arthropoda
- Clade: Pancrustacea
- Class: Insecta
- Order: Lepidoptera
- Family: Crambidae
- Genus: Pediasia
- Species: P. aridalis

Binomial name
- Pediasia aridalis (Hampson, 1900)

Synonyms
- Crambus aridalis Hampson, 1900

Species of moth

Pediasia aridalis is a moth in the family Crambidae. It was described by George Hampson in 1900. It is found in Transcaucasia.
