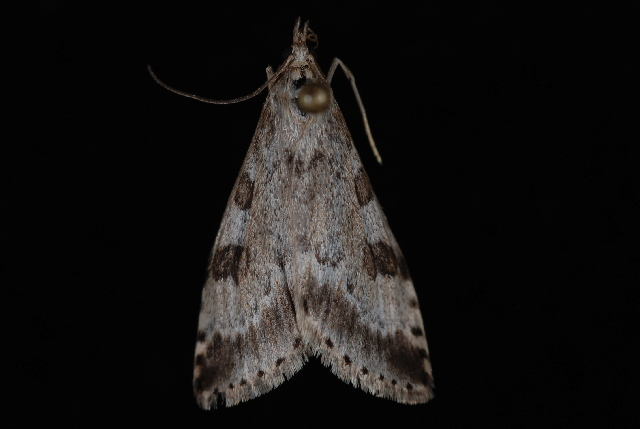

Scientific classification
- Domain: Eukaryota
- Kingdom: Animalia
- Phylum: Arthropoda
- Class: Insecta
- Order: Lepidoptera
- Family: Crambidae
- Genus: Udea
- Species: U. washingtonalis

Binomial name
- Udea washingtonalis (Grote, 1882)

Synonyms
- Botis washingtonalis Grote, 1882; Botis invinctalis Hulst, 1886; Pionea washingtonialis Hampson, 1899

= Udea washingtonalis =

Species of moth

Udea washingtonalis, the Washington udea moth, is a moth in the family Crambidae. It was described by Augustus Radcliffe Grote in 1882. It is found in North America, where it has been recorded from Alaska, British Columbia, California, Montana and Washington.

The wingspan is about 21 mm. Adults are on wing from May to August.

== Subspecies ==
- Udea washingtonalis washingtonalis (Washington)
- Udea washingtonalis hollandi Munroe, 1966 (British Columbia, Montana)
- Udea washingtonalis nomensis Munroe, 1966 (Alaska)
- Udea washingtonalis pribilofensis Munroe, 1966 (Alaska: Pribilof Islands)
