= Pediasia kuldjaensis =

Scientific classification
- Kingdom: Animalia
- Phylum: Arthropoda
- Clade: Pancrustacea
- Class: Insecta
- Order: Lepidoptera
- Family: Crambidae
- Genus: Pediasia
- Species: P. kuldjaensis

Binomial name
- Pediasia kuldjaensis (Caradja, 1916)

Synonyms
- Crambus jucundellus var. kuldjaensis Caradja, 1916; Pediasia soffneri Bleszynski, 1954

Species of moth

Pediasia kuldjaensis is a species of moth in the family Crambidae described by Aristide Caradja in 1916. It is found in Russia, China and Turkmenistan.
