= Pyrausta furvicoloralis =

Scientific classification
- Kingdom: Animalia
- Phylum: Arthropoda
- Class: Insecta
- Order: Lepidoptera
- Family: Crambidae
- Genus: Pyrausta
- Species: P. furvicoloralis

Binomial name
- Pyrausta furvicoloralis Hampson, 1900

Species of moth

Pyrausta furvicoloralis is a moth in the family Crambidae. It was described by George Hampson in 1900. It is found in Amur, Russia.
