= Pyrausta curvalis =

Scientific classification
- Domain: Eukaryota
- Kingdom: Animalia
- Phylum: Arthropoda
- Class: Insecta
- Order: Lepidoptera
- Family: Crambidae
- Genus: Pyrausta
- Species: P. curvalis

Binomial name
- Pyrausta curvalis (Leech, 1889)

Synonyms
- Botys curvalis Leech, 1889

Species of moth

Pyrausta curvalis is a moth in the family Crambidae. It was described by John Henry Leech in 1889. It is found in China.
