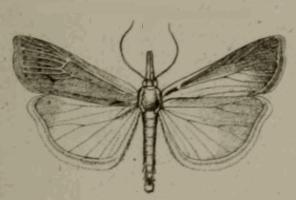

Scientific classification
- Kingdom: Animalia
- Phylum: Arthropoda
- Clade: Pancrustacea
- Class: Insecta
- Order: Lepidoptera
- Family: Crambidae
- Genus: Agriphila
- Species: A. tersellus

Binomial name
- Agriphila tersellus (Lederer, 1855)

Synonyms
- Crambus tersellus Lederer, 1855; Agriphila tersella; Crambus austellus Chrétien, 1913; Crambus chneouri D. Lucas, 1942; Crambus graphellus Constant, 1884; Crambus hungaricus Schmidt, 1909; Agriphila hungaricus; Agriphila hungarica; Crambus uniformellus Caradja, 1928

= Agriphila tersellus =

Species of moth

Agriphila tersellus is a species of moth in the family Crambidae. The species was described by Julius Lederer in 1855. It is found in Spain, Portugal, France, Italy, Austria, Croatia, Slovakia, Hungary, Romania, Bulgaria, Greece, Morocco, Algeria, Tunisia, Asia Minor, Turkmenistan, Syria, Lebanon, Iran and Transcaucasia.

The wingspan is 22–26 mm.
