= Anania egentalis =

Scientific classification
- Kingdom: Animalia
- Phylum: Arthropoda
- Clade: Pancrustacea
- Class: Insecta
- Order: Lepidoptera
- Family: Crambidae
- Genus: Anania
- Species: A. egentalis

Binomial name
- Anania egentalis (Christoph, 1881)

Synonyms
- Botys verbascalis var. egentalis Christoph, 1881; Anania fuscoverbascalis Mutuura, 1954

Species of moth

Anania egentalis is a moth in the family Crambidae. It was described by Hugo Theodor Christoph in 1881. It is found in the Russian Far East (Amur) and Japan (Honshu).
