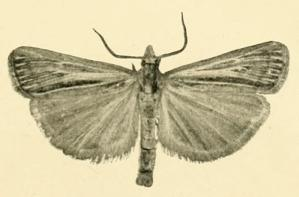

Scientific classification
- Kingdom: Animalia
- Phylum: Arthropoda
- Clade: Pancrustacea
- Class: Insecta
- Order: Lepidoptera
- Family: Crambidae
- Genus: Pediasia
- Species: P. pectinicornis

Binomial name
- Pediasia pectinicornis (Rebel, 1910)

Synonyms
- Crambus pectinicornis Rebel, 1910

= Pediasia pectinicornis =

Species of moth

Pediasia pectinicornis is a species of moth in the family Crambidae described by Hans Rebel in 1910. It is found in Russia and western Central Asia.

The length of the forewings is about 12.5 mm.
