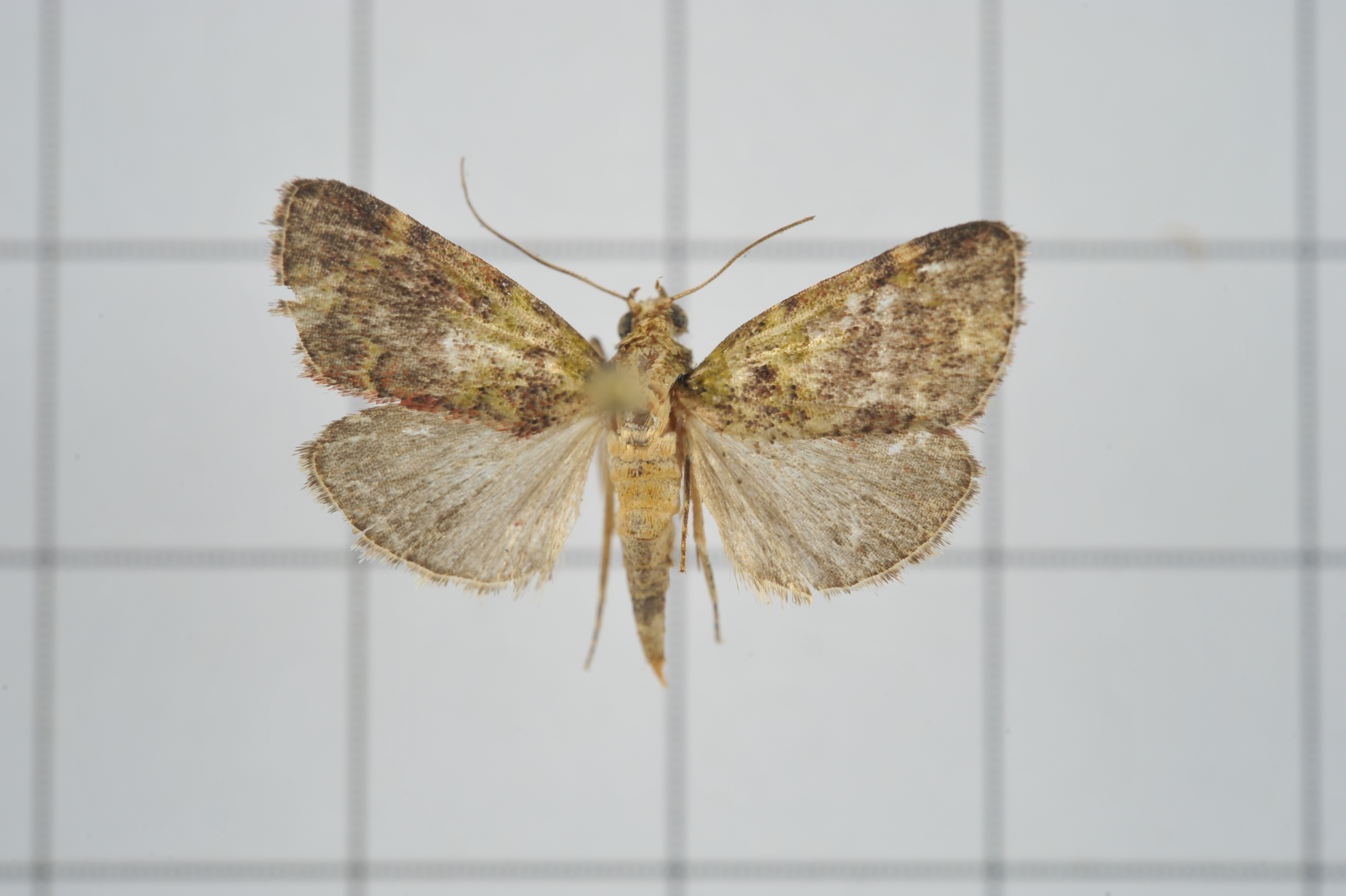

Scientific classification
- Domain: Eukaryota
- Kingdom: Animalia
- Phylum: Arthropoda
- Class: Insecta
- Order: Lepidoptera
- Family: Pyralidae
- Genus: Orthaga
- Species: O. olivacea

Binomial name
- Orthaga olivacea Warren, 1891

Synonyms
- Macalla amurensis Hampson, 1900; Stericta shisalis Strand, 1919

= Orthaga olivacea =

Species of moth

Orthaga olivacea is a species of snout moth in the genus Orthaga. It was described by Warren in 1891. It is found in China, Japan, Taiwan and the Russian Far East.
