= Pediasia ledereri =

Scientific classification
- Kingdom: Animalia
- Phylum: Arthropoda
- Clade: Pancrustacea
- Class: Insecta
- Order: Lepidoptera
- Family: Crambidae
- Genus: Pediasia
- Species: P. ledereri

Binomial name
- Pediasia ledereri Błeszyński, 1954

Species of moth

Pediasia ledereri is a moth in the family Crambidae. It was described by Stanisław Błeszyński in 1954. It is found in Central Asia, where it has been recorded from the Altai Mountains.
