= Pediasia huebneri =

Scientific classification
- Kingdom: Animalia
- Phylum: Arthropoda
- Clade: Pancrustacea
- Class: Insecta
- Order: Lepidoptera
- Family: Crambidae
- Genus: Pediasia
- Species: P. huebneri

Binomial name
- Pediasia huebneri Bleszynski, 1954

Species of moth

Pediasia huebneri is a species of moth in the family Crambidae. It is found in southern Russia.
