= Pediasia georgella =

Scientific classification
- Kingdom: Animalia
- Phylum: Arthropoda
- Clade: Pancrustacea
- Class: Insecta
- Order: Lepidoptera
- Family: Crambidae
- Genus: Pediasia
- Species: P. georgella

Binomial name
- Pediasia georgella Kosakjewitsch, 1978

Species of moth

Pediasia georgella is a moth in the family Crambidae. It was described by Kosakjewitsch in 1978. It is found in Russia, where it has been recorded from southern Transbaikal.
