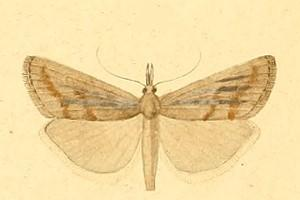

Scientific classification
- Kingdom: Animalia
- Phylum: Arthropoda
- Clade: Pancrustacea
- Class: Insecta
- Order: Lepidoptera
- Family: Crambidae
- Genus: Pediasia
- Species: P. pedriolellus

Binomial name
- Pediasia pedriolellus (Duponchel, 1836)

Synonyms
- Crambus pedriolellus Duponchel, 1836; Pediasia pedriolella; Tinea spuriella Hübner, 1796

= Pediasia pedriolellus =

Species of moth

Pediasia pedriolellus is a species of moth in the family Crambidae described by Philogène Auguste Joseph Duponchel in 1836. It is found in the Alps of France, Germany, Austria, Switzerland and Italy.
