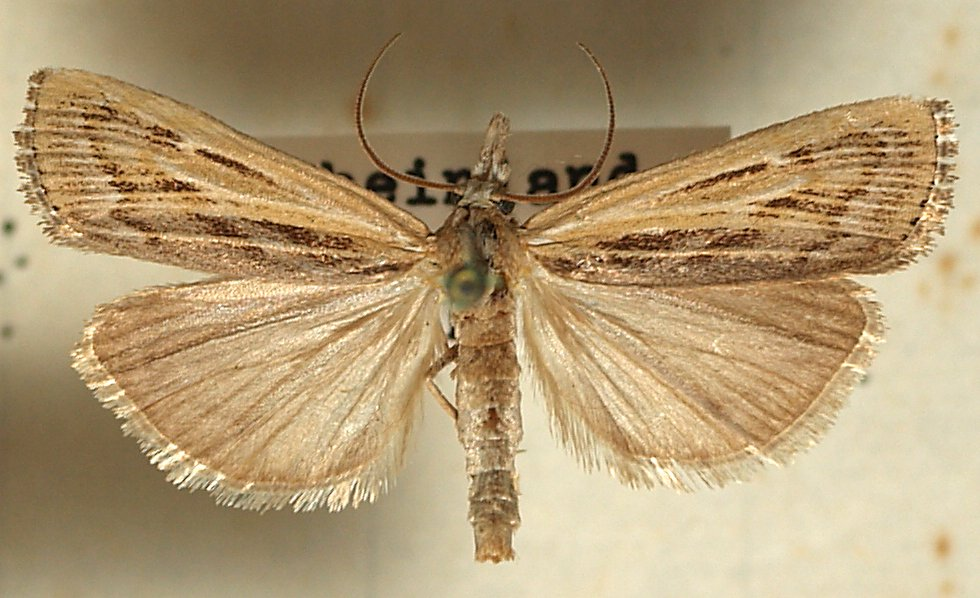
- Mounted

Scientific classification
- Kingdom: Animalia
- Phylum: Arthropoda
- Clade: Pancrustacea
- Class: Insecta
- Order: Lepidoptera
- Family: Crambidae
- Genus: Pediasia
- Species: P. fascelinella

Binomial name
- Pediasia fascelinella (Hübner, [1813])

Synonyms
- Tinea fascelinella Hübner, 1813; Tinea treitschkeella Sodoffsky, 1830

= Pediasia fascelinella =

Species of moth

Pediasia fascelinella is a species of moth of the family Crambidae. It was described by Jacob Hübner in 1813 and is found in Europe.

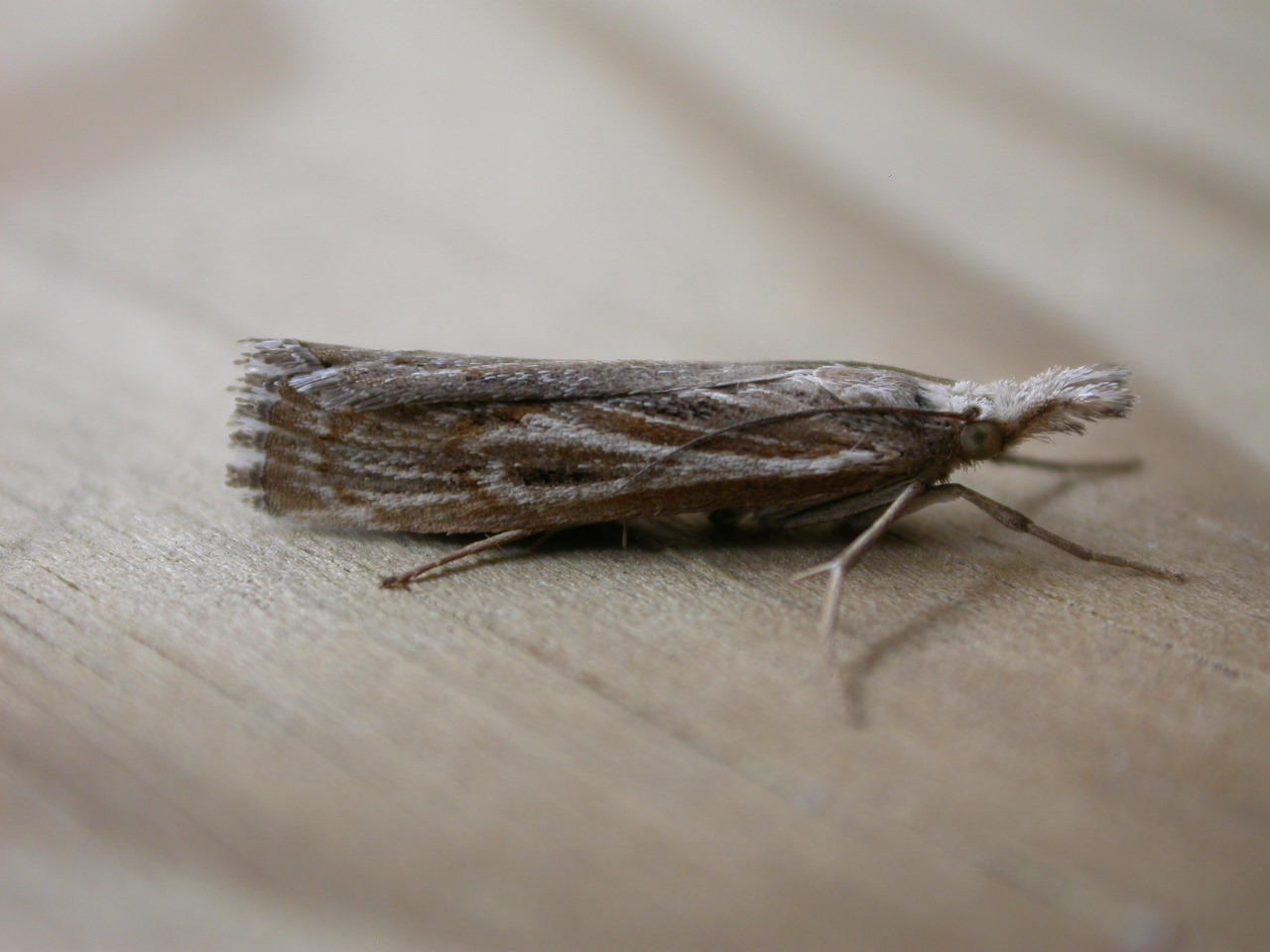

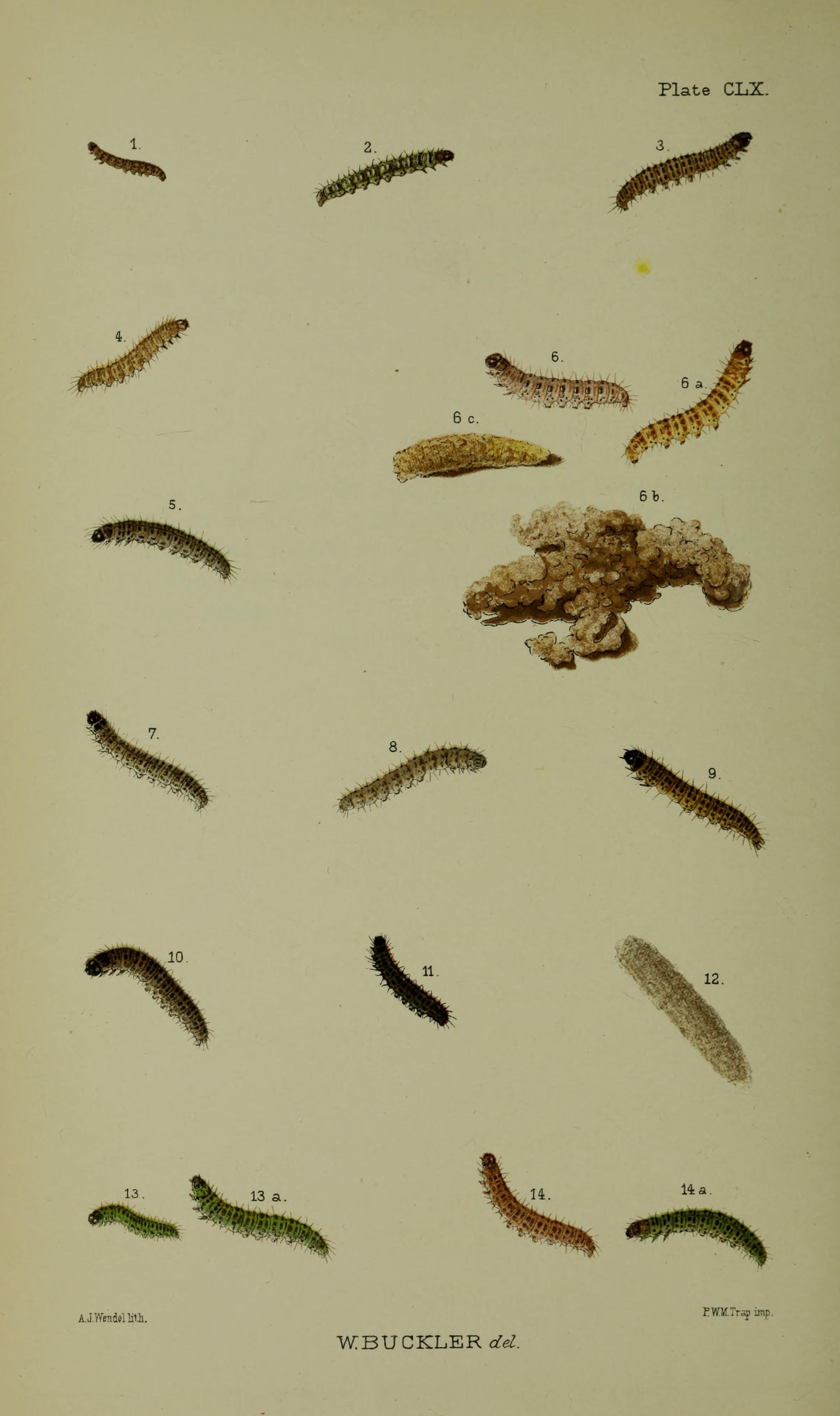
Figs, 6, 6a larva after final moult 6b mass of cocoons 6c pupa case

The wingspan is 24–30 mm. The moth flies from July to August depending on the location.

The larvae feed on various grasses.
