= Pediasia jucundellus =

Scientific classification
- Kingdom: Animalia
- Phylum: Arthropoda
- Clade: Pancrustacea
- Class: Insecta
- Order: Lepidoptera
- Family: Crambidae
- Genus: Pediasia
- Species: P. jucundellus

Binomial name
- Pediasia jucundellus (Herrich-Schaffer, 1847)

Synonyms
- Crambus jucundellus Herrich-Schaffer, 1847; Pediasia jucundella; Crambus festivellus Herrich-Schäffer, 1847; Crambus jucundellus ab. simplicellus Szent-Ivány & Uhrik-Meszáros, 1942; Pediasia saisanella Bleszynski, 1954; Pediasia adamczewskii Bleszynski, 1954; Pediasia sareptella Bleszynski, 1954

Species of moth

Pediasia jucundellus is a species of moth in the family Crambidae described by Gottlieb August Wilhelm Herrich-Schäffer in 1847. It is found on the Balkan Peninsula and in Ukraine, Russia and Central Asia.
