= Pediasia zellerella =

Scientific classification
- Kingdom: Animalia
- Phylum: Arthropoda
- Clade: Pancrustacea
- Class: Insecta
- Order: Lepidoptera
- Family: Crambidae
- Genus: Pediasia
- Species: P. zellerella

Binomial name
- Pediasia zellerella (Staudinger, 1899)

Synonyms
- Crambus zellerella Staudinger, 1899; Pediasia zellerellus

Species of moth

Pediasia zellerella is a species of moth in the family Crambidae. It was described by Otto Staudinger in 1899. It is found in the Altai Mountains.
