= Pediasia gregori =

Scientific classification
- Kingdom: Animalia
- Phylum: Arthropoda
- Clade: Pancrustacea
- Class: Insecta
- Order: Lepidoptera
- Family: Crambidae
- Genus: Pediasia
- Species: P. gregori

Binomial name
- Pediasia gregori Roesler, 1975

Species of moth

Pediasia gregori is a species of moth in the family Crambidae. It was described by Roesler in 1975. It is found in Mongolia.
