= Pediasia matricella =

Scientific classification
- Kingdom: Animalia
- Phylum: Arthropoda
- Clade: Pancrustacea
- Class: Insecta
- Order: Lepidoptera
- Family: Crambidae
- Genus: Pediasia
- Species: P. matricella

Binomial name
- Pediasia matricella (Treitschke, 1832)

Synonyms
- Phycis matricella Treitschke, 1832; Crambus matricellus var. obscurus Caradja, 1931; Crambus matricella stenopterellus Amsel, 1949

Species of moth

Pediasia matricella is a species of moth in the family Crambidae described by Georg Friedrich Treitschke in 1832. It is found in Italy, Austria, Hungary, Romania, Bulgaria, the Republic of Macedonia, Greece, Ukraine, Russia. In the east, the range extends to Transcaucasia, Asia Minor, Turkmenistan, Jordan, Syria, Iran and Israel.

== Subspecies ==
- Pediasia matricella matricella (Europe, southern Russia, Transcaucasia, Asia Minor, Jordan, Syria, Iran)
- Pediasia matricella stenopterella (Amsel, 1949) (Mesopotamia, Turkmenistan)
