= Pediasia epineurus =

Scientific classification
- Kingdom: Animalia
- Phylum: Arthropoda
- Clade: Pancrustacea
- Class: Insecta
- Order: Lepidoptera
- Family: Crambidae
- Genus: Pediasia
- Species: P. epineurus

Binomial name
- Pediasia epineurus (Meyrick, 1883)

Synonyms
- Crambus epineurus Meyrick, 1883; Pediasia epineura; Crambus ramosellus Zeller, 1863 (preocc.)

Species of moth

Pediasia epineurus is a species of moth in the family Crambidae described by Edward Meyrick in 1883. It is found in southern Russia, as well as in Minusinsk, the Altai, and Turkestan.
