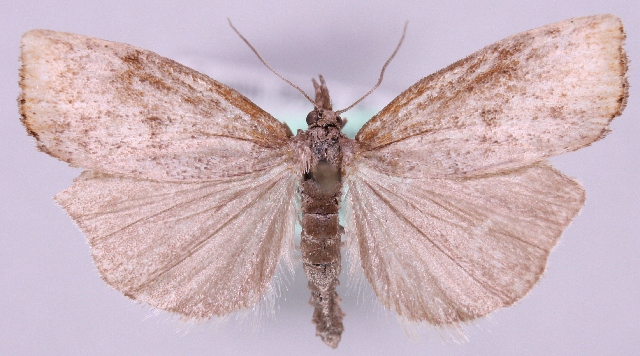

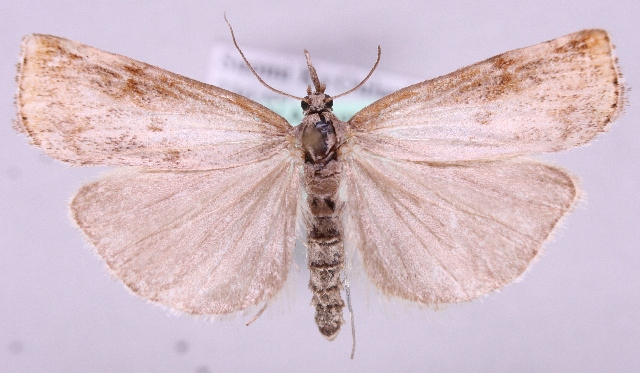

Scientific classification
- Kingdom: Animalia
- Phylum: Arthropoda
- Clade: Pancrustacea
- Class: Insecta
- Order: Lepidoptera
- Family: Crambidae
- Genus: Pediasia
- Species: P. truncatellus

Binomial name
- Pediasia truncatellus (Zetterstedt, 1839)

Synonyms
- Chilo truncatellus Zetterstedt, 1839; Pediasia truncatella; Crambus abtrusellus Walker, 1863; Crambus lienigiellus Zeller, 1843; Crambus licnigiellus Hampson, 1896; Hypena rufinalis Walker, 1866

= Pediasia truncatellus =

Species of moth

Pediasia truncatellus is a species of moth in the family Crambidae described by Johan Wilhelm Zetterstedt in 1839. It is found in Fennoscandia, northern Russia, the Baltic region, the Czech Republic and Canada.

The wingspan is 25–30 mm. Adults are on wing in June and July in northern Europe and in June North America.

The larvae possibly feed on Sphagnum species.
