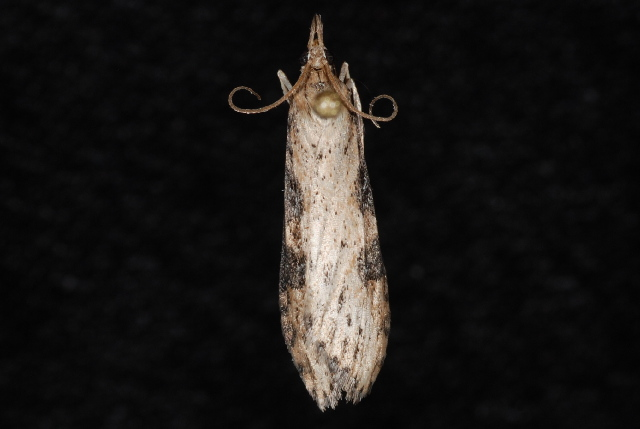

Scientific classification
- Kingdom: Animalia
- Phylum: Arthropoda
- Class: Insecta
- Order: Lepidoptera
- Family: Crambidae
- Genus: Udea
- Species: U. itysalis

Binomial name
- Udea itysalis (Walker, 1859)

Synonyms
- Scoparia itysalis Walker, 1859; Botys hyperborealis Möschler, 1874; Botys hyperboraleis Staudinger, 1892; Pionea hyperborealis f. similissima Caradja, 1916; Stantira variegata Walker, 1863; Phlyctaenia tillialis Dyar, 1904; Phlyctaenia tillialais W. P. Curtis, 1934

= Udea itysalis =

Species of moth

Udea itysalis is a moth in the family Crambidae. It was described by Francis Walker in 1859. It is found in North America, where it has been recorded from British Columbia to Quebec, south to Colorado, California, Nevada and Arizona. It has also been recorded from the Sayan Mountains in Russia.

The wingspan is about 23 mm.

== Subspecies ==
- Udea itysalis itysalis
- Udea itysalis albimontanensis Munroe, 1966 (Arizona, New Mexico)
- Udea itysalis clarkensis Munroe, 1966 (southern Nevada, California)
- Udea itysalis durango Munroe, 1966 (Colorado, Utah)
- Udea itysalis kodiakensis Munroe, 1966 (Alaska)
- Udea itysalis marinensis Munroe, 1966 (California: San Francisco Bay region)
- Udea itysalis mertensialis Munroe, 1966 (Nova Scotia)
- Udea itysalis rindgeorum Munroe, 1966 (Utah)
- Udea itysalis tillialis (Dyar, 1904) (British Columbia)
- Udea itysalis wasatchensis Munroe, 1966 (central Utah)
