= Pyralis perversalis =

Scientific classification
- Domain: Eukaryota
- Kingdom: Animalia
- Phylum: Arthropoda
- Class: Insecta
- Order: Lepidoptera
- Family: Pyralidae
- Genus: Pyralis
- Species: P. perversalis

Binomial name
- Pyralis perversalis (Herrich-Schaffer, 1849)

Synonyms
- Asopia perversalis Herrich-Schaffer, 1849; Pyralis lucidalis Eversmann, 1844; Pyralis narynensis Zerny, 1914; Pyralis perversalis rubiginetincta Caradja, 1931; Stemmatophora kaszabi Whalley, 1966

Species of moth

Pyralis perversalis is a species of snout moth. It is found from the Czech Republic, Slovakia, Hungary and Romania east into Asia, including Kazakhstan, Mongolia and Russia.

The wingspan is about 16 mm.
