= Scoparia mandschurica =

Scientific classification
- Kingdom: Animalia
- Phylum: Arthropoda
- Class: Insecta
- Order: Lepidoptera
- Family: Crambidae
- Genus: Scoparia
- Species: S. mandschurica

Binomial name
- Scoparia mandschurica Christoph, 1881

Species of moth

Scoparia mandschurica is a moth in the family Crambidae. It was described by Hugo Theodor Christoph in 1881. It is found in Russia.
