= Pediasia radicivitta =

Scientific classification
- Kingdom: Animalia
- Phylum: Arthropoda
- Clade: Pancrustacea
- Class: Insecta
- Order: Lepidoptera
- Family: Crambidae
- Genus: Pediasia
- Species: P. radicivitta

Binomial name
- Pediasia radicivitta (Filipjev, 1927)

Synonyms
- Crambus radicivitta Filipjev, 1927; Pediasia radicivittus

Species of moth

Pediasia radicivitta is a moth in the family Crambidae. It was described by Ivan Nikolayevich Filipjev in 1927. It is found in Russia (Minussinsk, Urga) and Mongolia.
