= Pediasia sajanella =

Scientific classification
- Kingdom: Animalia
- Phylum: Arthropoda
- Clade: Pancrustacea
- Class: Insecta
- Order: Lepidoptera
- Family: Crambidae
- Genus: Pediasia
- Species: P. sajanella

Binomial name
- Pediasia sajanella (Caradja, 1925)

Synonyms
- Crambus sajanella Caradja, 1925; Pediasia sajanellus

Species of moth

Pediasia sajanella is a moth in the family Crambidae. It was described by Aristide Caradja in 1925. It is found in Central Asia (Sajan, Arasagungol).
