= Epischnia adultella =

Scientific classification
- Kingdom: Animalia
- Phylum: Arthropoda
- Clade: Pancrustacea
- Class: Insecta
- Order: Lepidoptera
- Family: Pyralidae
- Genus: Epischnia
- Species: E. adultella

Binomial name
- Epischnia adultella Zeller, 1848

Synonyms
- Myelois ampliatella Heinemann, 1864; Epischnia mongolica Amsel, 1954; Epischnia zophodiella Ragonot, 1887; Eucarphia (Megasis) gregariella Erschoff, 1877

Species of moth

Epischnia adultella is a species of snout moth in the genus Epischnia. It was described by Philipp Christoph Zeller in 1848 and is known from Russia, Mongolia, France, Italy and Greece.

The wingspan is about 25 mm.
