= Epischnia cretaciella =

Scientific classification
- Kingdom: Animalia
- Phylum: Arthropoda
- Clade: Pancrustacea
- Class: Insecta
- Order: Lepidoptera
- Family: Pyralidae
- Genus: Epischnia
- Species: E. cretaciella

Binomial name
- Epischnia cretaciella Mann, 1869

Synonyms
- Bradyrrhoa demartinella Turati & Zanon, 1922; Epischnia cuculliella Ragonot, 1887

Species of moth

Epischnia cretaciella is a species of moth in the family Pyralidae. It is found in Croatia, North Macedonia, Greece, Turkey, Russia and Libya.

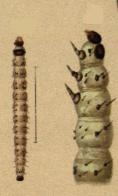
Larvae

The wingspan is about 31 mm.

The larvae have been recorded feeding on Helichrysum italicum and Inula candida.
