= Pediasia persellus =

Scientific classification
- Kingdom: Animalia
- Phylum: Arthropoda
- Clade: Pancrustacea
- Class: Insecta
- Order: Lepidoptera
- Family: Crambidae
- Genus: Pediasia
- Species: P. persellus

Binomial name
- Pediasia persellus (Toll, 1947)

Synonyms
- Crambus persellus Toll, 1947; Pediasia persella

Species of moth

Pediasia persellus is a species of moth in the family Crambidae described by Sergiusz Graf von Toll in 1947. It is found in the Ural, Asia Minor and Iran.
