= Pediasia pseudopersella =

Scientific classification
- Kingdom: Animalia
- Phylum: Arthropoda
- Clade: Pancrustacea
- Class: Insecta
- Order: Lepidoptera
- Family: Crambidae
- Genus: Pediasia
- Species: P. pseudopersella

Binomial name
- Pediasia pseudopersella Błeszyński, 1959

Species of moth

Pediasia pseudopersella is a moth in the family Crambidae. It was described by Stanisław Błeszyński in 1959. It is found in Iran, where it has been recorded from the Elburz Mountains.
