= Scoparia x-signata =

Scientific classification
- Kingdom: Animalia
- Phylum: Arthropoda
- Class: Insecta
- Order: Lepidoptera
- Family: Crambidae
- Genus: Scoparia
- Species: S. x-signata

Binomial name
- Scoparia x-signata (Filipjev, 1927)

Synonyms
- Eudorea x-signata Filipjev, 1927

Species of moth

Scoparia x-signata is a moth in the family Crambidae. It was described by Ivan Nikolayevich Filipjev in 1927. It is found in Russia, where it has been recorded from Siberia.
