= Pediasia altaica =

Scientific classification
- Kingdom: Animalia
- Phylum: Arthropoda
- Clade: Pancrustacea
- Class: Insecta
- Order: Lepidoptera
- Family: Crambidae
- Genus: Pediasia
- Species: P. altaica

Binomial name
- Pediasia altaica (Staudinger, 1899)

Synonyms
- Crambus altaica Staudinger, 1899

Species of moth

Pediasia altaica is a moth in the family Crambidae. It was described by Staudinger in 1899. It is found in Asia, where it has been recorded Sajan, Irkutsk, Amur, Altai, Tannu-Ola, Kentei and Minussinsk.
