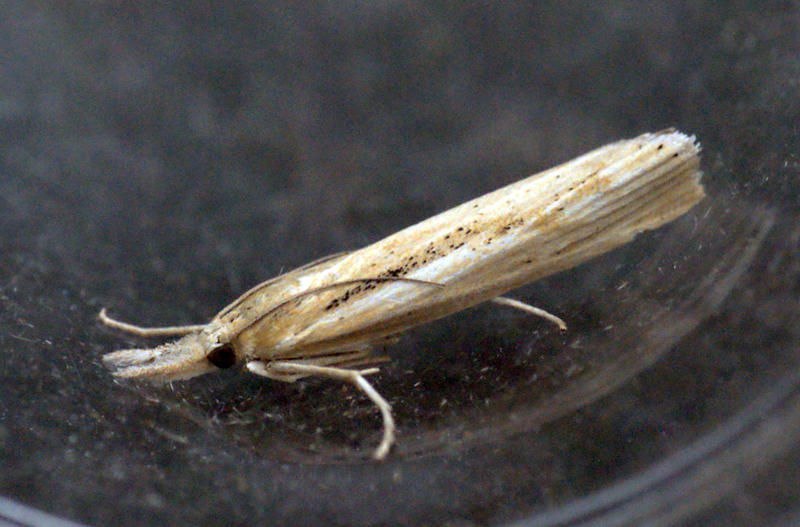
- Pediasia aridella nominate Thames Estuary, England
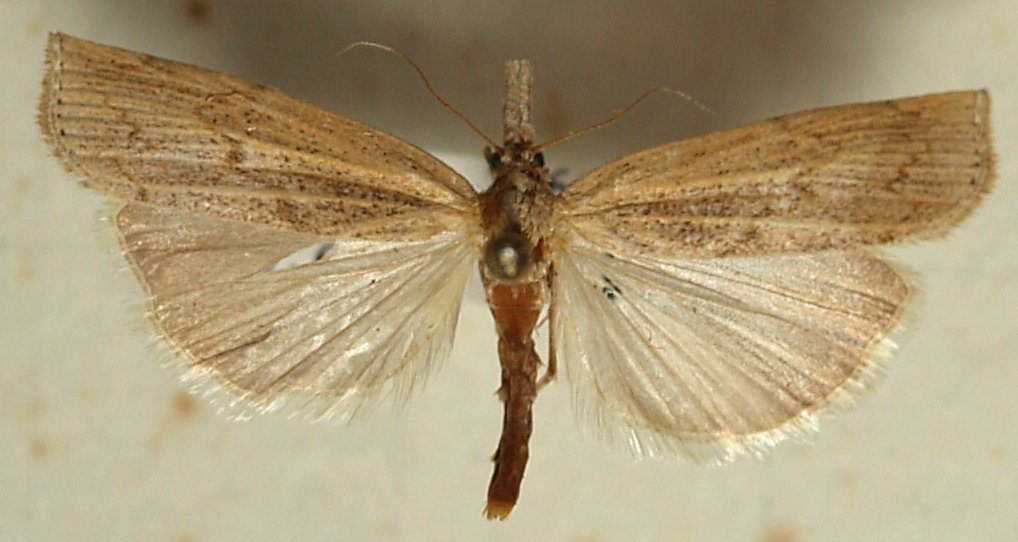
- Subspecies Peridasia aridella caradjella

Scientific classification
- Kingdom: Animalia
- Phylum: Arthropoda
- Clade: Pancrustacea
- Class: Insecta
- Order: Lepidoptera
- Family: Crambidae
- Genus: Pediasia
- Species: P. aridella

Binomial name
- Pediasia aridella (Thunberg, 1788)

Synonyms
- Tinea aridella Thunberg, 1794; Crambus aridella caradjaellus Rebel, 1907; Crambus aridella edmontellus McDunnough, 1923; Crambus monotonus Filipjev, 1927; Crambus salinellus nepos Rothschild, 1911; Pediasia kasyi Ganev, 1983; Pseudopediasia mikkolai Ganev, 1987; Crambus salinellus Tutt, 1887; Crambus salinellus ludovicellus Marion, 1952; Pediasia aridella ludovicellus (Marion, 1952); Pediasia kenderesiensis Fazekas, 1987

= Pediasia aridella =

Species of moth

Pediasia aridella is a species of moth of the family Crambidae. It was described by Carl Peter Thunberg in 1788 and is found in Europe. There are three recognised subspecies.

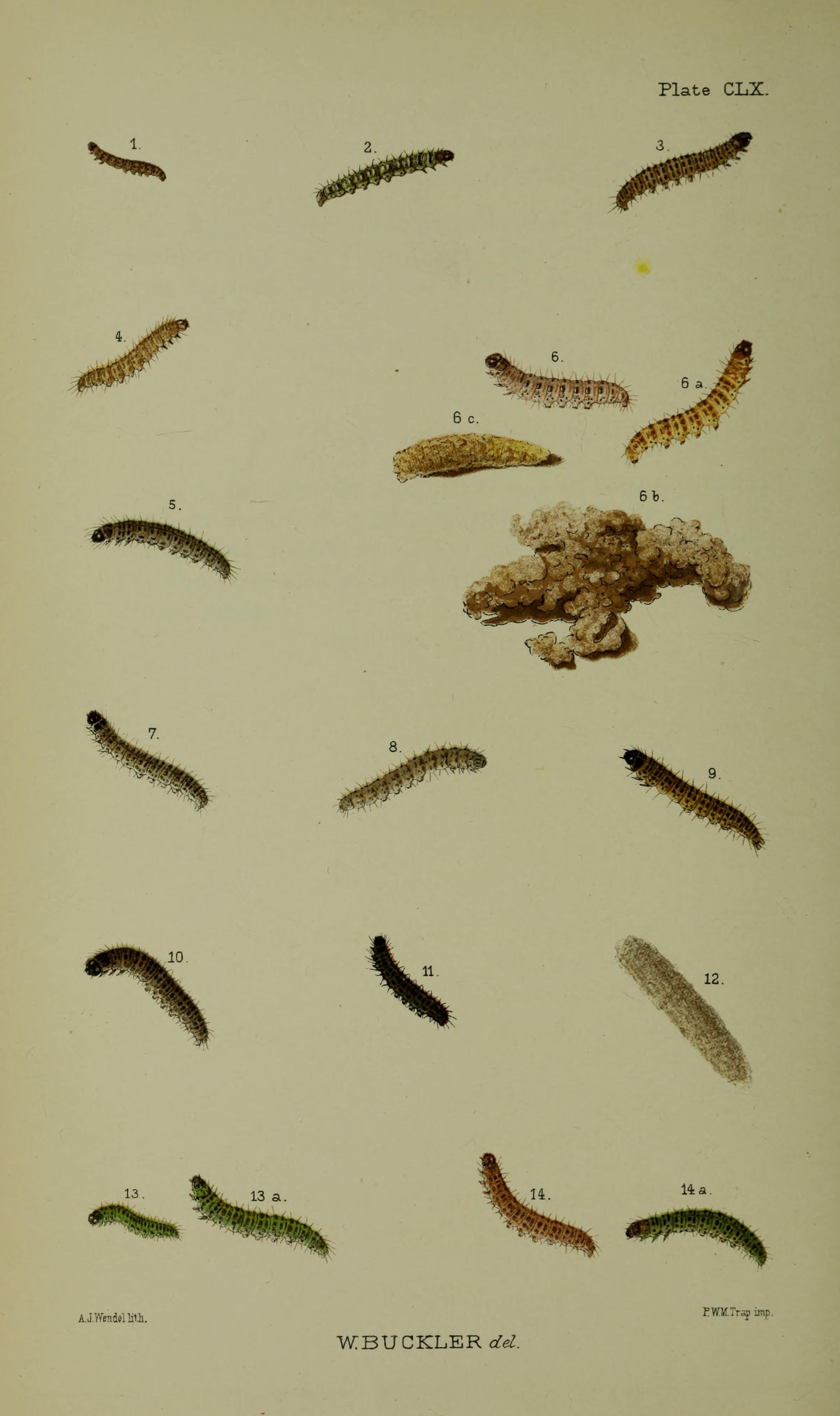
Figs. 8 larva after final moult

The wingspan is 20–26 mm. The forewings are ochreous, veins variably pale or whitish, interneural spaces sometimes blackish-sprinkled; a blackish streak beneath median vein from base to middle; lines obscurely darker, on lower half blackish mixed, median very strongly curved, very oblique dorsally, second curved, slightly indented below middle; three or four black dots on lower half of termen; cilia ochreous, mixed with white. Hindwings are whitish-grey or very pale grey. The larva is pale ochreous-grey; dorsal line darker; spots light brownish; head light or dark brown, darker-marked; plate of 2 sometimes dark brown.

The moth flies from June to September depending on the location.

The larvae feed on various grasses.

== Subspecies ==
- Pediasia aridella aridella
- Pediasia aridella caradjaellus (Rebel, 1907)
- Pediasia aridella edmontellus (McDunnough, 1923)
