= Uralsk, Republic of Bashkortostan =

Uralsk Уральск
- Selo
- Location within Bashkortostan Location within Russia
- Coordinates: 54°07′N 59°07′E
- Country: Russia
- Region: Bashkortostan
- District: Uchalinsky District

Population (2010)
  - Total: 1,717
- Time zone: UTC+5:00

Uralsk (Russian: Уральск) is a rural locality (a selo) and the administrative centre of Uralsky Selsoviet, Uchalinsky District, Bashkortostan, Russia. The population was 1,717 as of 2010.

== Geography ==
Uralsk is located 40 km southwest of Uchaly (the district's administrative centre) by road. Istamgulovo is the nearest rural locality.
