= Phyllactinia cornicola =

Scientific classification
- Kingdom: Fungi
- Division: Ascomycota
- Class: Leotiomycetes
- Order: Helotiales
- Family: Erysiphaceae
- Genus: Phyllactinia
- Species: P. cornicola

Binomial name
- Phyllactinia cornicola I. Zafar, Afshan & Khalid, 2023

Species of fungus

Phyllactinia cornicola is a species of powdery mildew in the family Erysiphaceae. It is found in Pakistan where it infects Cornus macrophylla and Cornus capitata.

== Description ==
The fungus forms mycelium on the undersides of the leaves of its hosts. As with most Erysiphaceae, Phyllactinia cornicola is highly host-specific, infecting only plants in the genus Cornus. Phyllactinia cornicola can be found in any habitats where its host species occur. Its reported host range is Cornus macrophylla and Cornus capitata. Many other species of powdery mildew also occur on Cornus, including one other species of Phyllactinia: Phyllactinia corni, widely distributed in the Holarctic. Phyllactinia cornicola can be distinguished from this species by its shorter conidiophores and smaller chasmothecia, asci and ascospores.

== Taxonomy ==
Phyllactinia cornicola was formally described by I. Zafar, N.S. Afshan and A.N. Khalid in 2023. The type specimen was collected in Pakistan on Cornus macrophylla. The specific epithet derives from the host genus.

== Micromorphology ==
=== Description ===
The mycelium is hypophyllous (found on leaf undersides) and sometimes covers the entire surface. The hyphal appressoria are nipple-shaped or rod-shaped and occur both solitarily and in opposite pairs. Conidophores arise from the upper surface of their mother cell. They have long straight foot cells. The conidiophores produce single conidia. Conidia are roughly clavate with a rounded apex. The chasmothecia (fruiting bodies) have 6–11 straight, often pointed appendages around the equator, which have a bulbous basal swelling. The peridium of the chasmothecia has cells of irregular shape. Phyllactinia cornicola has two spores per ascus which are roughly ellipsoid and colourless. The asci are clavate and short-stalked.

=== Measurements ===
Conidiophores are up to 120–175 μm long and 5–7 μm wide, with foot cells that measure up to 80 μm long. Conidia are 55–90 × 15–18 μm. The chasmothecia are 150–200 μm in diameter with peridium cells 5–20 μm in diameter. Appendages are 1–1.5× the diameter of the chasmothecia and 4–7 μm wide. Asci generally number 10–13 and are 40–60 × 24–34 μm with ascospores measuring 20–30 × 13–17 μm.
