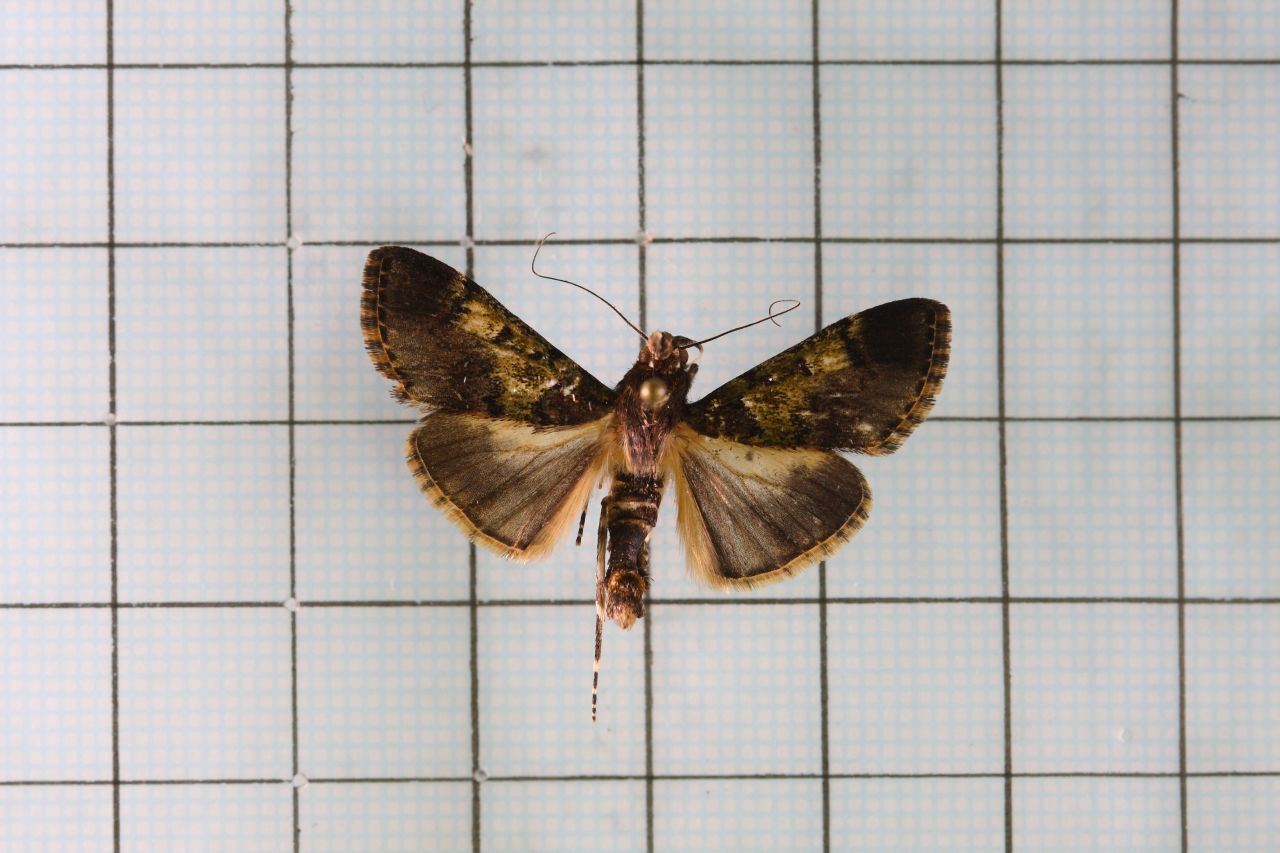

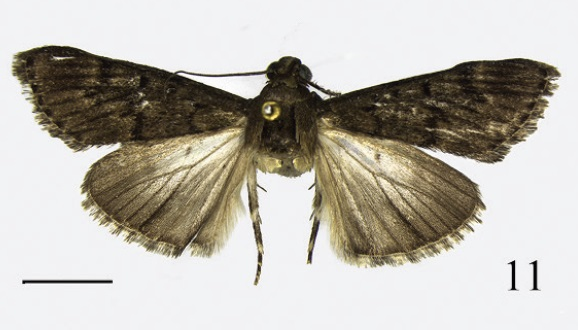

Scientific classification
- Domain: Eukaryota
- Kingdom: Animalia
- Phylum: Arthropoda
- Class: Insecta
- Order: Lepidoptera
- Family: Pyralidae
- Genus: Teliphasa
- Species: T. elegans

Binomial name
- Teliphasa elegans (Butler, 1881)

Synonyms
- Locastra elegans Butler, 1881; Termioptycha elegans; Macalla elegans

= Teliphasa elegans =

Species of moth

Teliphasa elegans is a species of moth of the family Pyralidae. It is found in Taiwan, Korea, the Russian Far East, Japan and China (Fujian, Guangxi, Guizhou, Hebei, Heilongjiang, Henan, Hubei, Hunan, Shaanxi and Tianjin).

The wingspan is 30–35 mm. The species has two forms: a blackish form and the whitish from. The blackish form can be differentiated by the forewing and the distal two-thirds of the hindwings which are blackish brown. The whitish form is similar to Teliphasa albifusa superficially.

The larvae feed on Glycine max and Cornus macrophylla.
