= Phyllactinia picridis =

Scientific classification
- Kingdom: Fungi
- Division: Ascomycota
- Class: Leotiomycetes
- Order: Helotiales
- Family: Erysiphaceae
- Genus: Phyllactinia
- Species: P. picridis

Binomial name
- Phyllactinia picridis (Castagne) M. Bradshaw, Khodap. & U. Braun, 2025

Synonyms
- Erysiphe picridis Castagne, 1845; Leveillula picridis (Castagne) Durrieu & Rostam, 1985

Fungal plant pathogen

Phyllactinia picridis is a species of powdery mildew, fungal plant pathogens in the family Erysiphaceae.

== Taxonomy ==
The fungus was formally described in 1845 by Castagne with the basionym Erysiphe picridis. The species was transferred to the current genus Phyllactinia in 2025 by Bradshaw et al. The genus of its previous taxonomic placement, Leveillula, is now considered conspecific with Phyllactinia.
