= Auzata chinensis =

Scientific classification
- Domain: Eukaryota
- Kingdom: Animalia
- Phylum: Arthropoda
- Class: Insecta
- Order: Lepidoptera
- Family: Drepanidae
- Genus: Auzata
- Species: A. chinensis

Binomial name
- Auzata chinensis Leech, 1898

Species of hook-tip moth

Auzata chinensis is a moth in the family Drepanidae. It was described by John Henry Leech in 1898. It is found in the Chinese provinces of Hunan, Sichuan, Zhejiang and Shaanxi.

The wingspan is about 38 mm for males 48 mm for females. Adults are similar to Auzata superba, but all the wings have a double antemedial pale fuscous line and an interrupted submarginal band of the same colour. The hindwings have a patch as on the forewings. The fringes of all wings are pale fuscous, interrupted with white at the ends of the nervules.

== Subspecies ==
- Auzata chinensis chinensis (China: Hunan, Sichuan)
- Auzata chinensis prolixa Watson, 1959 (China: Zhejiang)
- Auzata chinensis arcuata Watson, 1959 (China: southern Shaanxi, Sichuan)
