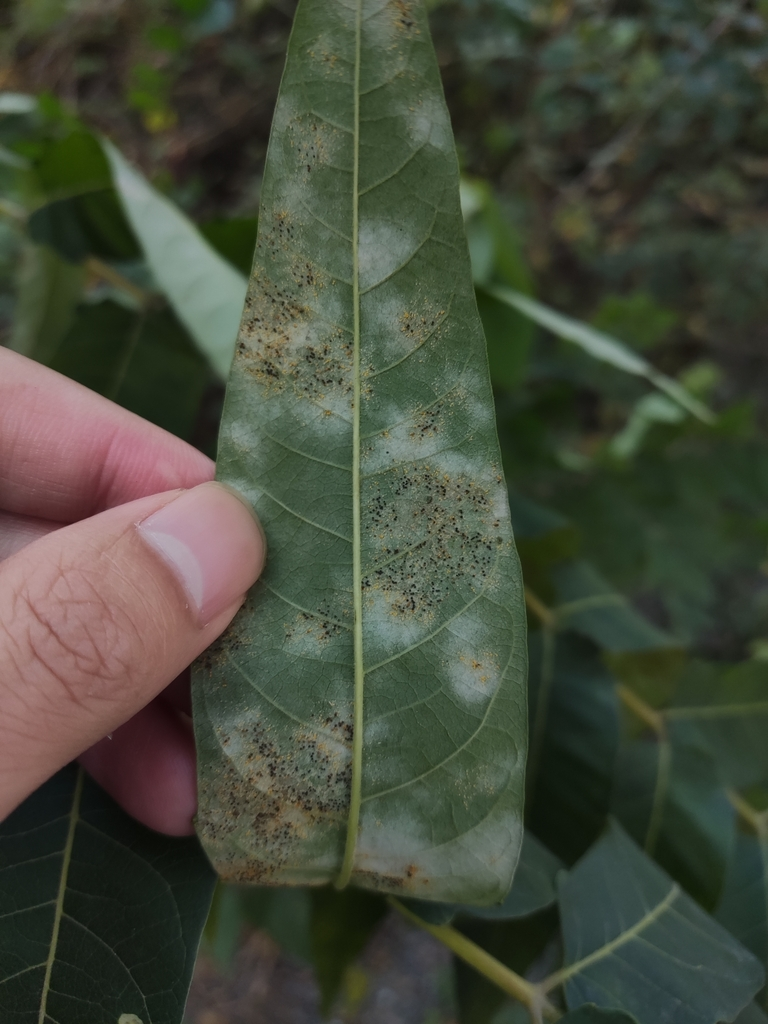

Scientific classification
- Kingdom: Fungi
- Division: Ascomycota
- Class: Leotiomycetes
- Order: Helotiales
- Family: Erysiphaceae
- Genus: Phyllactinia
- Species: P. ailanthi

Binomial name
- Phyllactinia ailanthi (Golovin & Bunkina) Y.N. Yu & S.J. Han, 1979

= Phyllactinia ailanthi =

Species of fungus

Phyllactinia ailanthi is a species of powdery mildew in the family Erysiphaceae. It is found in Asia and North America, where it affects the genus Ailanthus.

== Description ==
The fungus forms white, thin growth, later turning thick and grey-brown, on the undersides of host leaves. P. ailanthi, like most Erysiphaceae, is highly host-specific and infects only the genus Ailanthus. Other species reported from Ailanthus include Erysiphe platani (perhaps doubtfully) and Erysiphe alphitoides which have jumped hosts in Europe, and Erysiphe quercicola from India, all of which primarily affect the uppersides of leaves. Also found on this host genus are Pseudoidium ailanthi, which covers whole leaflets and causes distortions, and Erysiphe delavayi, found on stems or leaf undersides, appearing diffuse, whitish, and not thick or coloured.

== Taxonomy ==
The fungus was formally described in 1961 with the basionym Phyllactinia suffulta f. ailanthi by Golovin and Bunkina. The form was elevated to a species in 1979 by Y.N. Yu and S.J. Han.
