= Pseudoidium ailanthi =

Scientific classification
- Kingdom: Fungi
- Division: Ascomycota
- Class: Leotiomycetes
- Order: Helotiales
- Family: Erysiphaceae
- Genus: Erysiphe
- Species: P. ailanthi

Binomial name
- Pseudoidium ailanthi (Bhagyan. & Ramachar) U. Braun & R.T.A. Cook, 2012

Synonyms
- Oidium ailanthi Bhagyan. & Ramachar, 1983

Species of fungus

Pseudoidium ailanthi is a species of powdery mildew in the family Erysiphaceae. It is found in Asia, where it affects the genus Ailanthus.

== Description ==
The fungus forms thick white growth, covering whole leaflets and causing distortions. P. ailanthi, like most Erysiphaceae, is highly host-specific and infects only the genus Ailanthus. Other species reported from Ailanthus include Erysiphe platani (perhaps doubtfully) and Erysiphe alphitoides which have jumped hosts in Europe, and Erysiphe quercicola from India, all of which primarily affect the uppersides of leaves. Also found on this host genus are Phyllactinia ailanthi, which causes white, thin growth, later turning thick and grey-brown, on the undersides of host leaves, and Erysiphe delavayi, found on stems or leaf undersides, appearing diffuse, whitish, and not thick or coloured.

== Taxonomy ==
The fungus was formally described in 1983 with the basionym Oidium ailanthi by Bhagyanarayana and Ramachar. The type specimen was from India. The species was transferred to the genus Pseudoidium in 2012 by Uwe Braun and Roger T.A. Cook. With the implementation of the 'one fungus, one name' change to the Code, this anamorph genus was merged with Erysiphe. A new combination for this species however is yet to be published.
