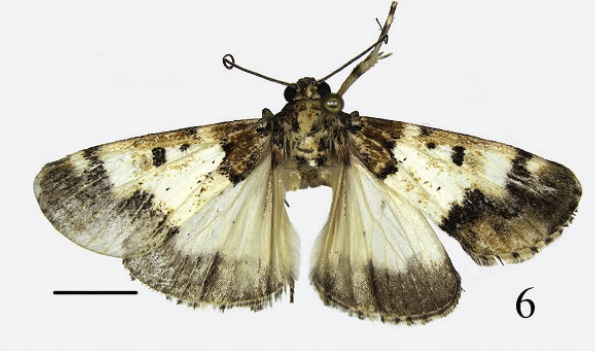

Scientific classification
- Domain: Eukaryota
- Kingdom: Animalia
- Phylum: Arthropoda
- Class: Insecta
- Order: Lepidoptera
- Family: Pyralidae
- Genus: Teliphasa
- Species: T. similalbifusa

Binomial name
- Teliphasa similalbifusa Li, 2016

= Teliphasa similalbifusa =

Species of moth

Teliphasa similalbifusa is a species of moth of the family Pyralidae. It is found in China (Guangxi).

The wingspan is about 34 mm. The forewing basal area is pale ocherous brown, mixed with black and white scales. The median area is white mixed with pale yellow and yellowish brown scales, with dense yellowish brown scales from the costa scattered to above the cell. The distal area is yellowish brown, mixed with black scales. The antemedian line is black, ill-defined anteriorly, extending distinctly from the black scale tuft near the base obliquely outward to below 1A+2A, then straightly reaching the dorsal one-third. The postmedian line is black, extending from the costal three-fourths obliquely outward to M2, then arched and extending inward along CuA1, forming a blunt angle, finally straight to the dorsal two-thirds, its inner margin serrated. The costa has a blackish-brown spot at the basal one-third diffused to above the cell, with a white spot at the outside of the postmedian line spreading to R5. The discal spot is small, black surrounded by pale yellowish brown, with raised white scales on its outer margin. The discocellular spot is nearly rectangular, relatively large, surrounded by pale yellowish brown scales and the terminal line is yellowish white, with ill-defined spots along its inner side. The hindwings have the basal three-fourths white mixed with pale yellow. The distal one-fourth is greyish brown, deepening from the costa to the dorsum and with the discocellular spot pale greyish brown.

== Etymology ==
The species name is derived from Latin simil- (meaning similar), and the specific name of another species Teliphasa albifusa, in reference to the similarity of the two species in the superficial morphology.
