= Sporidia =

Fungal structure for asexual reproduction

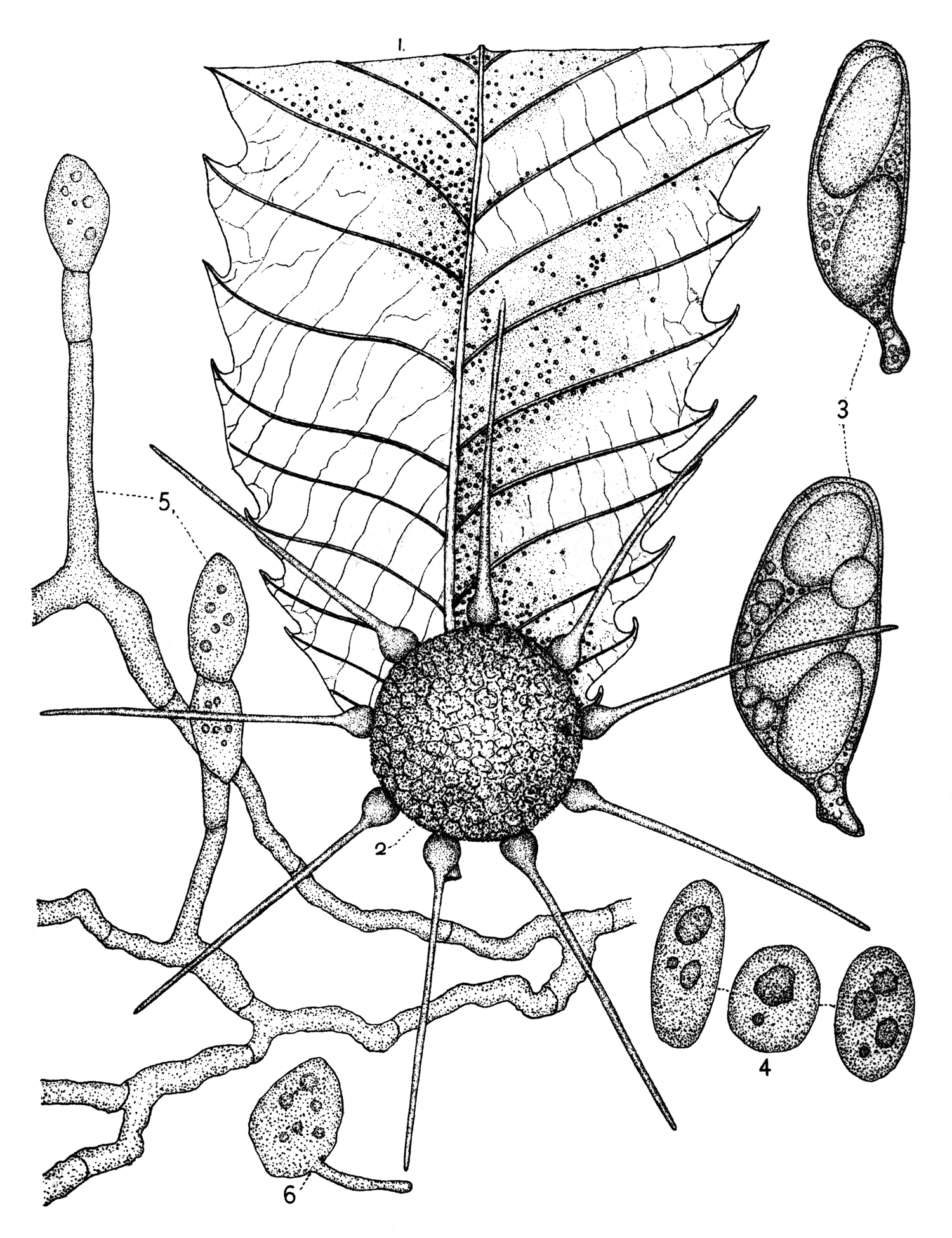
Phyllactinia guttata. Three sporidia are labeled '4'

Sporidia are result of homokaryotic smut fungi (which are not pathogenic), asexual reproduction through the process of budding.

Thus far, this has only been observed in vitro.
