= Auzata semilucida =

Scientific classification
- Domain: Eukaryota
- Kingdom: Animalia
- Phylum: Arthropoda
- Class: Insecta
- Order: Lepidoptera
- Family: Drepanidae
- Genus: Auzata
- Species: A. semilucida

Binomial name
- Auzata semilucida Chu & Wang, 1988

Species of hook-tip moth

Auzata semilucida is a moth in the family Drepanidae. It was described by Hong-Fu Chu and Lin-Yao Wang in 1988. It is found in Sichuan, China.

The length of the forewings is 9–10 mm. Adults have a large translucent patch on the hindwings.
