= Auzata plana =

Scientific classification
- Domain: Eukaryota
- Kingdom: Animalia
- Phylum: Arthropoda
- Class: Insecta
- Order: Lepidoptera
- Family: Drepanidae
- Genus: Auzata
- Species: A. plana

Binomial name
- Auzata plana Chu & Wang, 1988

Species of hook-tip moth

Auzata plana is a moth in the family Drepanidae. It was described by Hong-Fu Chu and Lin-Yao Wang in 1988. It is found in Sichuan, China.

The length of the forewings is about 23 mm.
