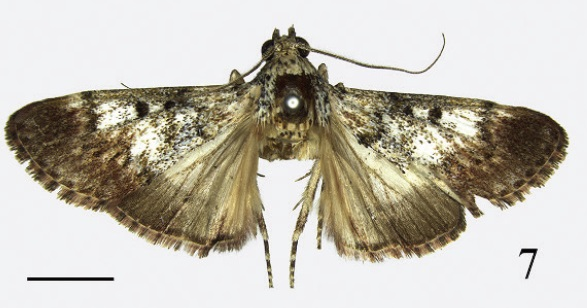

Scientific classification
- Domain: Eukaryota
- Kingdom: Animalia
- Phylum: Arthropoda
- Class: Insecta
- Order: Lepidoptera
- Family: Pyralidae
- Genus: Teliphasa
- Species: T. erythrina

Binomial name
- Teliphasa erythrina Li, 2016

= Teliphasa erythrina =

Species of moth

Teliphasa erythrina is a species of moth of the family Pyralidae. It is found in China (Yunnan).

The wingspan is about 36 mm. The forewings are white in the basal two-thirds, suffused with pale yellowish, pale brown and brownish black scales, with blackish brown scale tuft near the base, mottled white. The costa has brownish black scales from the basal one-third to two-thirds, diffused to above the cell, with a white spot at outside of the postmedian line, spreading to R5. The distal one-third reddish brown, tinged with white scales. The antemedian line is black wavy, extending from the costal one-third obliquely outward to below the cell, then obliquely inward to the scale tuft near the base, thereafter obliquely outward to 1A+2A, finally straight to the dorsal one-third. The postmedian line is black, extending from the costal two-thirds obliquely outward to M3, then running obliquely inward to the dorsal two-thirds, its inner margin serrated. The discal and discocellular spots brownish black, the former circular, the latter subrectangular. The terminal line is greyish white, with subrectangular blackish brown spots uniformly placed along its inner side, interrupted by pale brown at veins. The hindwings have the basal two-thirds white mixed with greyish scales. The distal one-third is deep grey tinged with pale reddish brown, gradually paler from the costa to the dorsum. The discocellular spot is pale brown.

== Etymology ==
The species name is derived from the Latin erythrinus (meaning red) and refers to the forewing reddish brown in the distal area.
