= Phyllactinia takamatsui =

Scientific classification
- Kingdom: Fungi
- Division: Ascomycota
- Class: Leotiomycetes
- Order: Helotiales
- Family: Erysiphaceae
- Genus: Phyllactinia
- Species: P. takamatsui

Binomial name
- Phyllactinia takamatsui Khodap. & A.H. Mohammadi, 2016

Species of fungus

Phyllactinia takamatsui is a species of powdery mildew in the family Erysiphaceae. It is found in North America and Eurasia, where it affects the genus Cotoneaster.

== Description ==
The fungus forms a weak, very thin, often smooth coating on the undersides of leaves of Cotoneaster. Phyllactinia pyri-serotinae is also reported from this genus.

== Taxonomy ==
The fungus was formally described in 2016 by Khodaparast and Mohammadi. The type specimen was collected in Iran. The species is named after Japanese mycologist Susumu Takamatsu.
