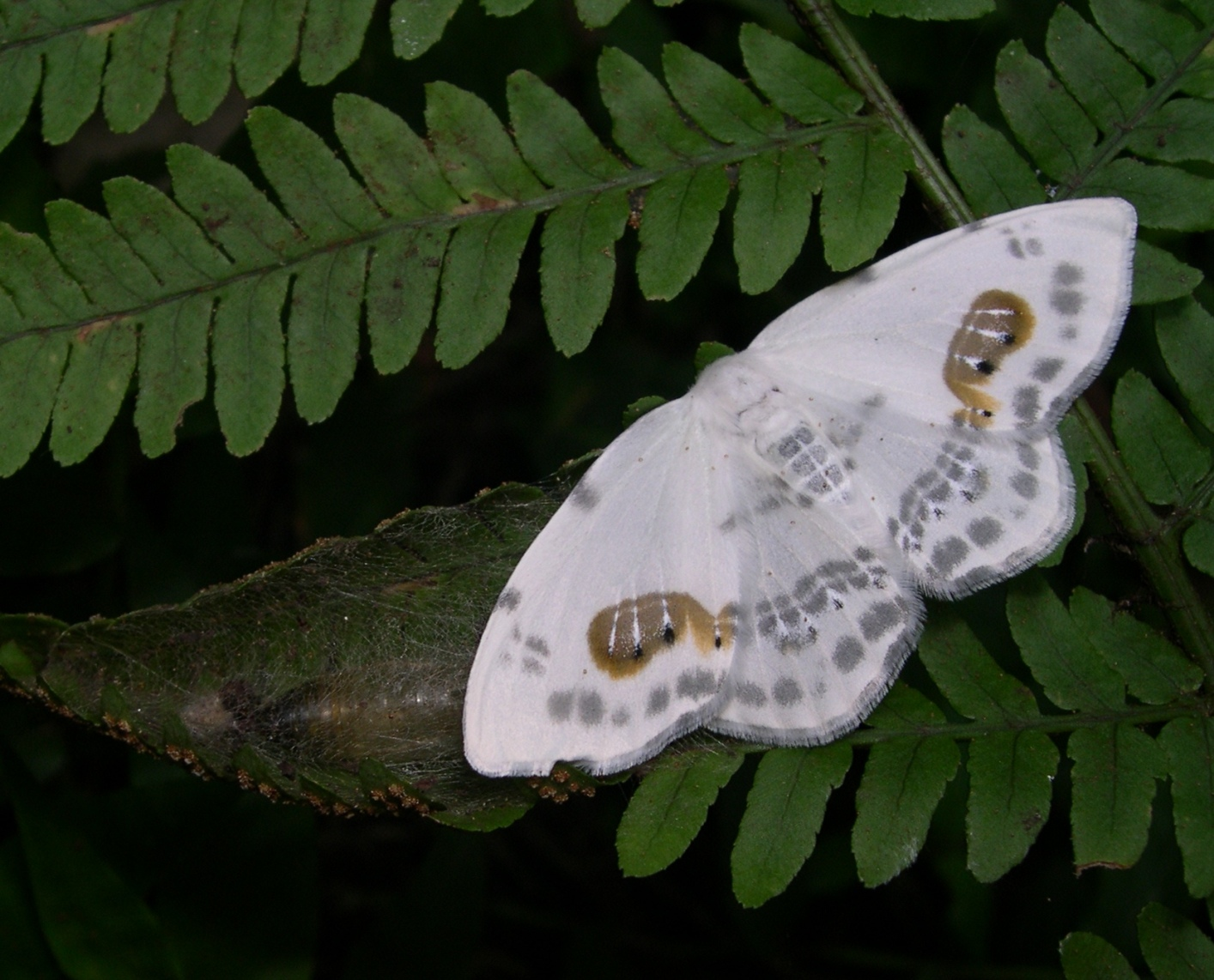
- Auzata superba

Scientific classification
- Domain: Eukaryota
- Kingdom: Animalia
- Phylum: Arthropoda
- Class: Insecta
- Order: Lepidoptera
- Family: Drepanidae
- Subfamily: Drepaninae
- Tribe: Drepanini
- Genus: Auzata; Walker, [1863]

Synonyms
- Gonocilix Warren, 1896

= Auzata =

Moth genus in family Drepanidae

Auzata is a genus of moths belonging to the subfamily Drepaninae. It was erected by Walker in 1863.

== Species ==
There are at least nine species:

- Auzata amaryssa H.F. Chu & L.Y. Wang, 1988
- Auzata chinensis Leech, 1898
- Auzata minuta Leech, 1898
- Auzata ocellata (Warren, 1896)
- Auzata plana H.F. Chu & L.Y. Wang, 1988
- Auzata semilucida H.F. Chu & L.Y. Wang, 1988
- Auzata semipavonaria Walker, [1863]
- Auzata simpliciata Warren, 1897
- Auzata superba Butler, 1878
