= Phyllactinia alangii =

Scientific classification
- Kingdom: Fungi
- Division: Ascomycota
- Class: Leotiomycetes
- Order: Helotiales
- Family: Erysiphaceae
- Genus: Phyllactinia
- Species: P. alangii

Binomial name
- Phyllactinia alangii Y.N. Yu & Y.Q. Lai, 1979

Species of fungus

Phyllactinia alangii is a species of powdery mildew in the family Erysiphaceae. It is found in Asia, where it affects the genus Alangium.

== Description ==
The fungus forms white, thin growth on the undersides of host leaves. P. alangii, like most Erysiphaceae, is highly host-specific and infects only the genus Alangium. Other species of powdery mildew (in the genus Erysiphe) have also been reported from this host genus.

== Taxonomy ==
The fungus was formally described in 1979 by Y.N. Yu and Y.Q. Lai.
