= Auzata ocellata =

Scientific classification
- Domain: Eukaryota
- Kingdom: Animalia
- Phylum: Arthropoda
- Class: Insecta
- Order: Lepidoptera
- Family: Drepanidae
- Genus: Auzata
- Species: A. ocellata

Binomial name
- Auzata ocellata (Warren, 1896)

Synonyms
- Gonocilix ocellata Warren, 1896

Species of hook-tip moth

Auzata ocellata is a moth in the family Drepanidae. It was described by Warren in 1896. It is found in northern India, northern Myanmar and Fujian in China.

The ocellatas' wingspan is about 36 millimetres (1.4 in) for males, and 48 millimetres (1.9 in) for females. Its forewings are white, with blue-grey markings. The first line is found at one-fourth and is marked by three blotches, and there is a large oblique oval pale olive blotch at the end of the cell, edged outwardly by fuscous brown. The veins within are silvery white and there is an oblique costal blotch above it, and a larger diffuse one beyond it. There is also a silvery-white streak on the inner edge of the ocellus, which is continued to the inner margin as an olive double streak. There is a subapical costal blotch and a submarginal blue-grey band of partially connected spots. There is also a marginal row of dark grey blotches. The hindwings have a double basal line and an ocelloid blue-grey blotch, containing a white line and silvery veins tipped with black, followed by three hyaline (glass-like) patches. The rest is as the forewings.
