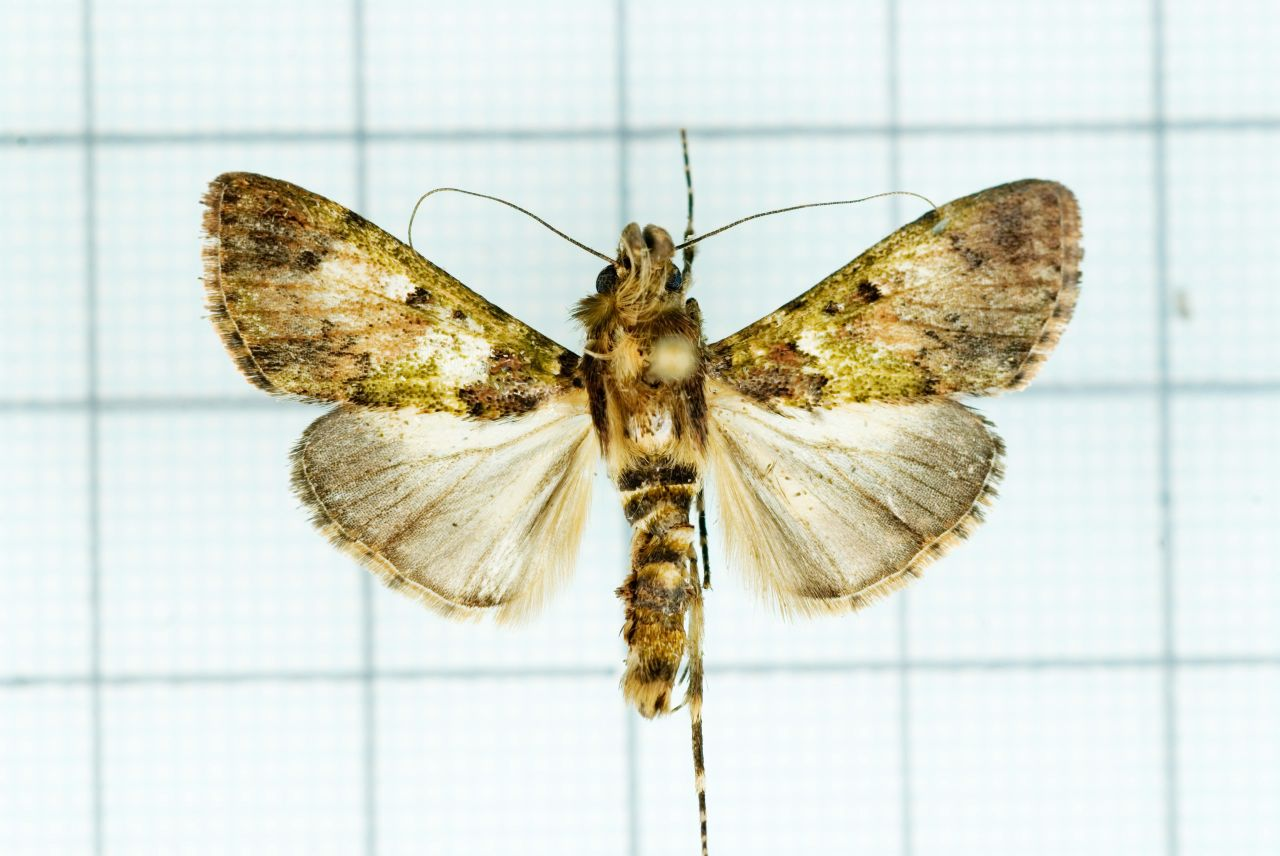

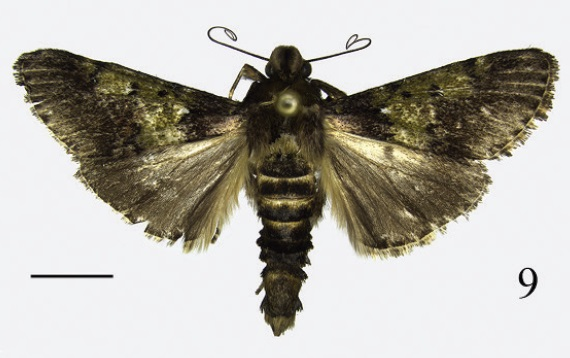

Scientific classification
- Domain: Eukaryota
- Kingdom: Animalia
- Phylum: Arthropoda
- Class: Insecta
- Order: Lepidoptera
- Family: Pyralidae
- Genus: Teliphasa
- Species: T. nubilosa

Binomial name
- Teliphasa nubilosa Moore, 1888

Synonyms
- Macalla formisibia Strand, 1919

= Teliphasa nubilosa =

Species of moth

Teliphasa nubilosa is a species of moth of the family Pyralidae. It is found in China (Fujian, Guangxi, Guizhou, Hainan, Henan, Hubei, Jiangxi, Sichuan, Yunnan, Zhejiang), Taiwan and India.

The wingspan is 26–38 mm. This species is different from its congeners by the forewing suffused with olive-green scales in the median area, the rather thick male labial palpus extending to thorax, and the dorsal side of the labial palpus with long brownish yellow hairs in the distal three-fourths.
