= Teliphasa sakishimensis =

Scientific classification
- Kingdom: Animalia
- Phylum: Arthropoda
- Class: Insecta
- Order: Lepidoptera
- Family: Pyralidae
- Genus: Teliphasa
- Species: T. sakishimensis

Binomial name
- Teliphasa sakishimensis Inoue & Yamanaka, 1975

Species of moth

Teliphasa sakishimensis is a species of moth of the family Pyralidae. It is found in China (Hubei, Sichuan), Taiwan and Japan.
