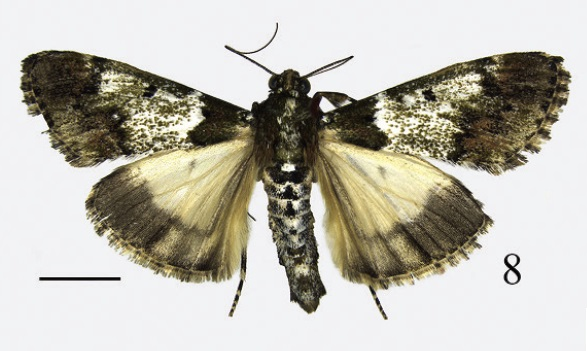

Scientific classification
- Domain: Eukaryota
- Kingdom: Animalia
- Phylum: Arthropoda
- Class: Insecta
- Order: Lepidoptera
- Family: Pyralidae
- Genus: Teliphasa
- Species: T. hamata

Binomial name
- Teliphasa hamata Li, 2016

= Teliphasa hamata =

Species of moth

Teliphasa hamata is a species of moth of the family Pyralidae. It is found in China (Fujian, Guangxi, Yunnan).

The wingspan is 32–36 mm. The basal area of the forewings is dark brown, mixed with black scales. The median area is white, with scattered brown scales and the distal area is ochreous brown, mixed with black and white scales. The costa is brown from the basal one-third to two-thirds, mixed with black scales, diffused to above the cell, with a white spot near the base and raised black scales at its outside, with a second white spot at the outside of the postmedian line, spreading to below R5. The antemedian line is black, extending from the costal one-fourth obliquely inward to the scale tuft near the base, then obliquely outward to below 1A+2A, finally obliquely inward to the dorsal one-third. The postmedian line is black, extending from the costal two-thirds obliquely outward to M2, then curved and extending inward along CuA1, forming an angle, finally straight to the dorsal two-thirds, its inner margin serrated. The discal and discocellular spots are black, the latter relatively large and the terminal line is pale yellow, with subrectangular brown or blackish-brown spots uniformly placed along its inner side, interrupted by white mixed with brown at the veins. The basal two-thirds of the hindwings is yellowish white, the distal one-third greyish brown, becoming paler from the costa to the dorsum and the discocellular spot is pale greyish brown.

== Etymology ==
The species name refers to the slender hooked cornutus protruding out from the phallus in the male genitalia and is derived from Latin hamatus (meaning hooked).
