= Auzata amaryssa =

Scientific classification
- Domain: Eukaryota
- Kingdom: Animalia
- Phylum: Arthropoda
- Class: Insecta
- Order: Lepidoptera
- Family: Drepanidae
- Genus: Auzata
- Species: A. amaryssa

Binomial name
- Auzata amaryssa Chu & Wang, 1988

Species of hook-tip moth

Auzata amaryssa is a moth in the family Drepanidae. It was described by Hong-Fu Chu and Lin-Yao Wang in 1988. It is found in the Chinese provinces of Fujian and Jiangxi.

The length of the forewings is 15–17 mm.
