= Podosphaera holodisci =

Scientific classification
- Kingdom: Fungi
- Division: Ascomycota
- Class: Leotiomycetes
- Order: Helotiales
- Family: Erysiphaceae
- Genus: Podosphaera
- Species: P. holodisci

Binomial name
- Podosphaera holodisci U. Braun, 2012

Species of fungus

Podosphaera holodisci is a species of powdery mildew in the family Erysiphaceae. It is found in North America, where it affects the genus Holodiscus.

== Description ==
The fungus forms a spreading, greyish-white coating on host leaves. P. holodisci, like most Erysiphaceae, is highly host-specific and infects only the genus Holodiscus. Another species of powdery mildew also infects this genus: Phyllactinia holodisci, which has weak, very thin, often smooth growth, on the undersides of leaves.

== Taxonomy ==
The fungus was formally described in 2012 by Uwe Braun.
