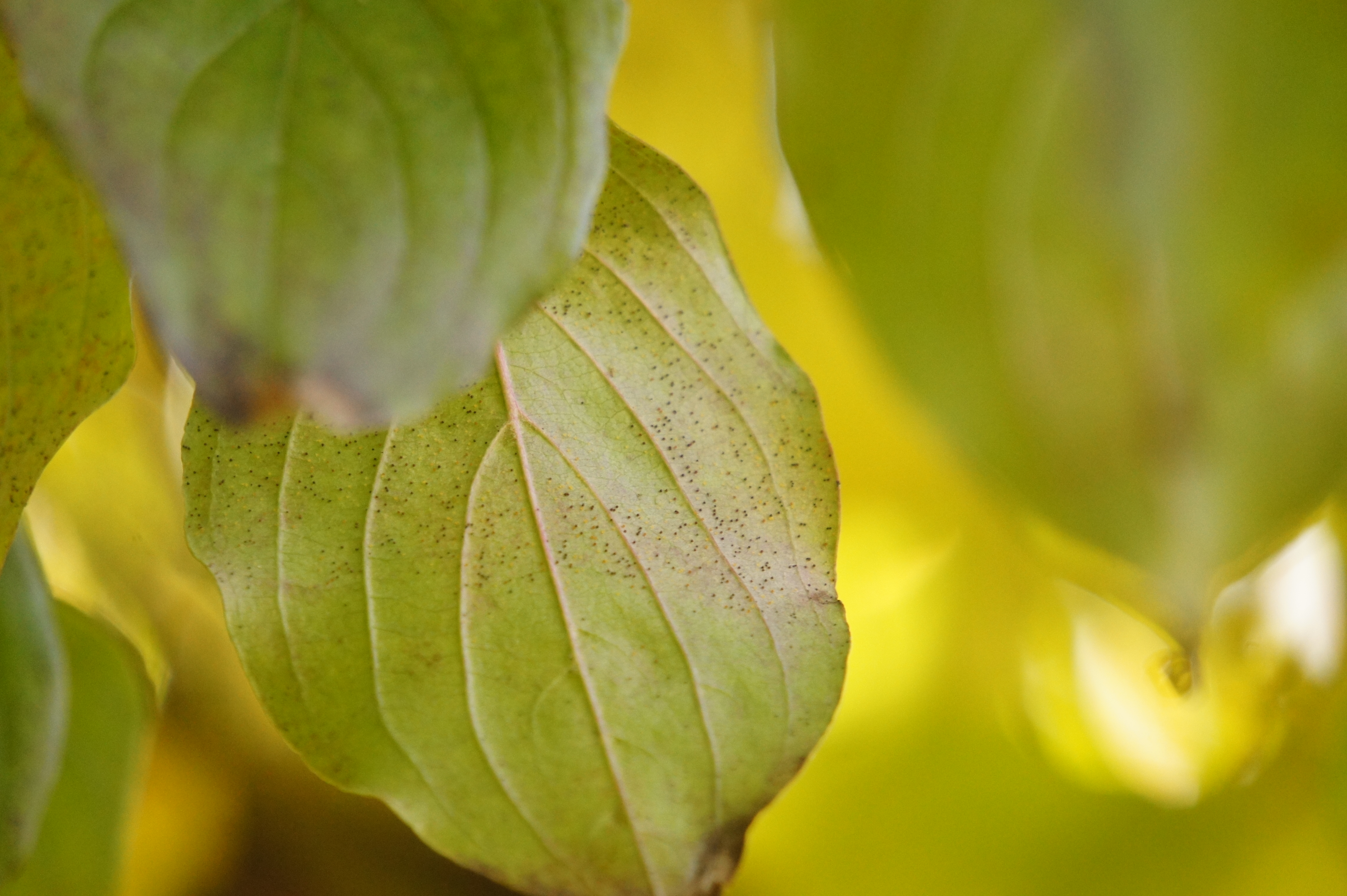
- Phyllactinia corni on Cornus in the UK

Scientific classification
- Kingdom: Fungi
- Division: Ascomycota
- Class: Leotiomycetes
- Order: Helotiales
- Family: Erysiphaceae
- Genus: Phyllactinia
- Species: P. corni

Binomial name
- Phyllactinia corni H.D. Shin & M.J. Park, 2012

Synonyms
- Phyllactinia corni H.D. Shin & Y.J. La, 1988; Phyllactinia guttata f. corni-maris Sacc., 1876; Phyllactinia suffulta f. corni Jacz., 1927

= Phyllactinia corni =

Species of fungus

Phyllactinia corni is a species of powdery mildew in the family Erysiphaceae. It is found in North America and Eurasia where it infects plants in the genus Cornus (dogwoods).

== Description ==
The fungus forms mycelium on the undersides of the leaves of its hosts. As with most Erysiphaceae, Phyllactinia corni is highly host-specific, infecting only plants in the genus Cornus. Furthermore, both its geographical and host range may be significantly smaller than that given by Braun and Cook (2012), as records from North America and Europe may both pertain to different, undescribed species. Phyllactinia corni can be found in any habitats where its host species occur, including urban and suburban gardens and parks. Its reported host range includes Cornus alba, alternifolia, amomum, asperifolia, canadensis, florida, foemina, glabrata, mas, nuttallii, obliqua, officinalis, racemosa, rugosa, sanguinea, sericea. Many other species of powdery mildew also occur on Cornus, including one other species of Phyllactinia: Phyllactinia cornicola, known solely from Pakistan.

== Taxonomy ==
Phyllactinia corni was first described by H.D. Shin and M.J. Park in 1988, but it was not effectively published. The species was formally described in the Taxonomic Manual of the Erysiphales in 2012. The type specimen was collected in South Korea on Cornus officinalis, and only a specimen from Japan has been sequenced, which proved distant from a single sequence of Phyllactinia on Cornus in Germany, suggesting that P. corni is actually multiple species. The specific epithet derives from the host genus.

== Micromorphology ==
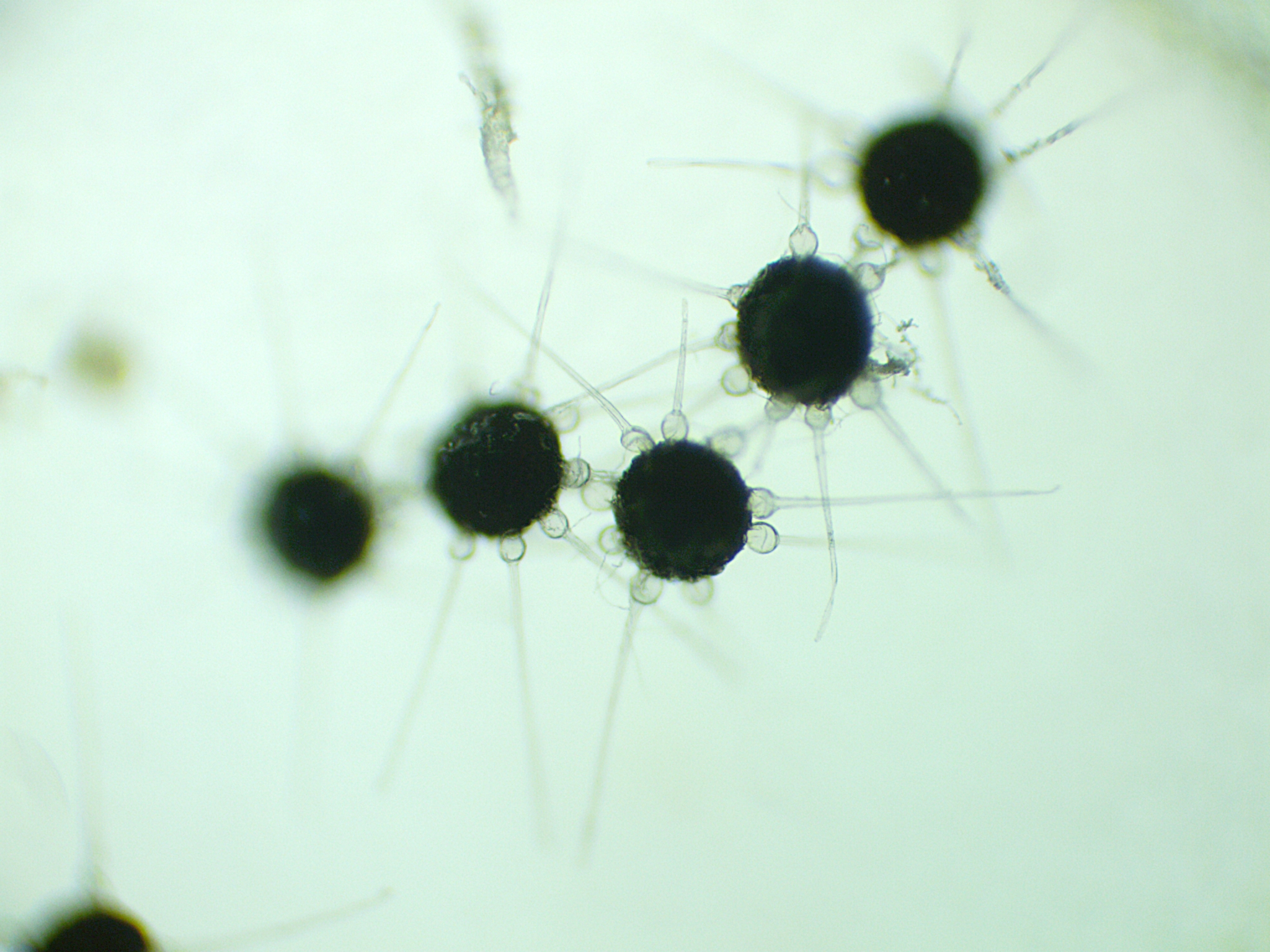
Chasmothecia of Phyllactinia corni under the microscope

=== Description ===
The mycelium is hypophyllous (found on leaf undersides) and sometimes covers the entire surface. The hyphal appressoria are nipple-shaped, rod-shaped or lobed and occur both solitarily and in opposite pairs. Conidophores arise centrally from their mother cell. They have very long foot cells that are straight with a basal septum generally not elevated. The conidiophores produce single conidia. Conidia are clavate with a rounded apex, and can be faintly pigmented. The chasmothecia (fruiting bodies) have 5–16 straight, pointed appendages around the equator, which have a bulbous basal swelling. The peridium of the chasmothecia has cells of irregular shape. Phyllactinia corni has two spores per ascus which are roughly ellipsoid and at first faintly olive-coloured, becoming colourless. The asci are typically clavate or saccate and are stalked.

=== Measurements ===
Hyphal cells measure 10–110 × 3–8 μm. Conidiophores are up to 50–325 μm long and 5–8 μm wide, with foot cells that measure 70–200 μm long. Conidia are 50–95 × 14–30 μm. The chasmothecia are 150–265 μm in diameter with peridium cells 5–25(–30) μm in diameter. Appendages are 0.8–2× the diameter of the chasmothecia and 6–12.5 μm wide near the base. Asci generally number 10–25 and are 50–90 × 25–40 μm with ascospores measuring 20–55 × 15–23 μm.
