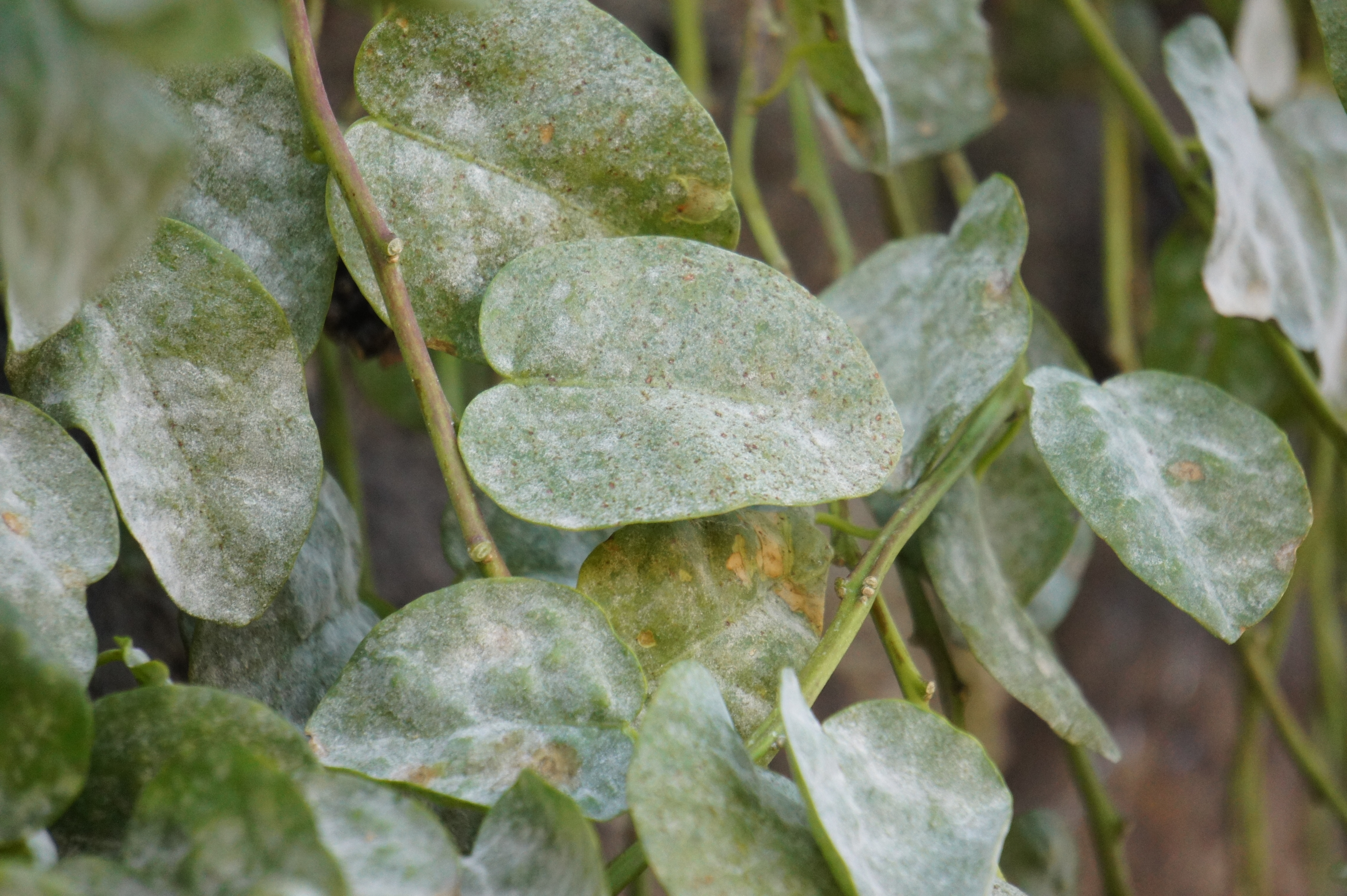
- Phyllactinia taurica sensu lato on Capparis in Italy.

Scientific classification
- Kingdom: Fungi
- Division: Ascomycota
- Class: Leotiomycetes
- Order: Helotiales
- Family: Erysiphaceae
- Genus: Phyllactinia
- Species: P. taurica

Binomial name
- Phyllactinia taurica (Lév.) M. Bradshaw, Khodap. & U. Braun, 2025

Synonyms
- List: Leveillula taurica (Lév.) G. Arnaud, 1921; Erysiphe taurica Lév., 1842; Oidopsis taurica (Lév.) E.S. Salmon, 1906; Erysiphe pegani Sorokin, 1889; Leveillula boraginacearum Golovin, 1956; Leveillula capparidacearum Golvin, 1956; Leveillula crucifearum Golvin, 1956; Leveillula cucurbitarum Golvin, 1956; Leveillula papaveracearum Golvin, 1956; Leveillula pedaliacearum Golvin, 1956; Leveillula rosacearum Golvin, 1956; Leveillula saxifragacearum Golvin, 1956; Leveillula solanacearum Golvin, 1956; Leveillula thymeleacearum Golvin, 1956; Oidopsis sicula Scal., 1902; Ovulariopsis sicula (Scal.) Cif. & Camera, 1962; Acrosporium gossypii Sumstine, 1913; Oidium gossypii (Sumstine) Sacc., 1931; Ovulariopsis gossypii Wakef., 1920; Oidopsis gossypii (Wakef.) Raych, 1950; Oidopsis papaveris Sawada, 1933; Oidopsis acladum Ferraris, 1937; Oidopsis acroclada (Ferraris) Cif. & Corte, 1957; Oidopsis lini Mundkur. & Thirum., 1951; Oidopsis impatientis Golovin, 1956; Ovulariopsis impatientis (Golovin) Cif. & Camera, 1962; Ovularia indica Ramachandra Rao, 1968; Oidopsis solani N. Ahmad, A.K. Sarbhoy, Kamal & D.K. Agarwal, 2006

= Phyllactinia taurica =

Species of fungus

Phyllactinia taurica is a species complex of powdery mildews in the family Erysiphaceae. It is found across the world, where it affects a vast array of different plant families. Phyllactinia taurica is one of the most polyphagous powdery mildew species in the world, although attempts have been made to split it in the past and it may be a complex of many cryptic species on different hosts.

== Description ==
The fungus forms superficial, sometimes quite dense mycelium on both sides of the leaves, stems and inflorescences of its host. The host range of Phyllactinia taurica is incredibly broad and includes genera in Boraginaceae, Brassicaceae, Capparaceae, Euphorbiaceae, Malvaceae, Papaveraceae, Passifloraceae, Pedaliaceae, Ranunculaceae, Rosaceae, Saxifragaceae, Solanaceae, Thymeleaceae and Zygophyllaceae. Phyllactinia taurica sensu lato is known on an even wider range of hosts, but the taxonomic affinity of most records is unclear. Many hosts of P. taurica are grown as crops.

== Taxonomy ==
The fungus was formally described in 1842 by Léveillé with the basionym Erysiphe taurica. The species was transferred to the current genus Phyllactinia in 2025 by Bradshaw et al. The genus of its previous taxonomic placement, Leveillula (named after Léveillé) is now considered conspecific with Phyllactinia.

== Environment ==
Phyllactinia taurica is found in most places where its hosts are found, but like many species in Phyllactinia sect. Leveillula, it is especially widespread in warmer and arid regions of the world. Species in the section are adapted to xerophytic conditions, exemplified by the ability of their conidia to germinate rapidly and at any relative humidity.
