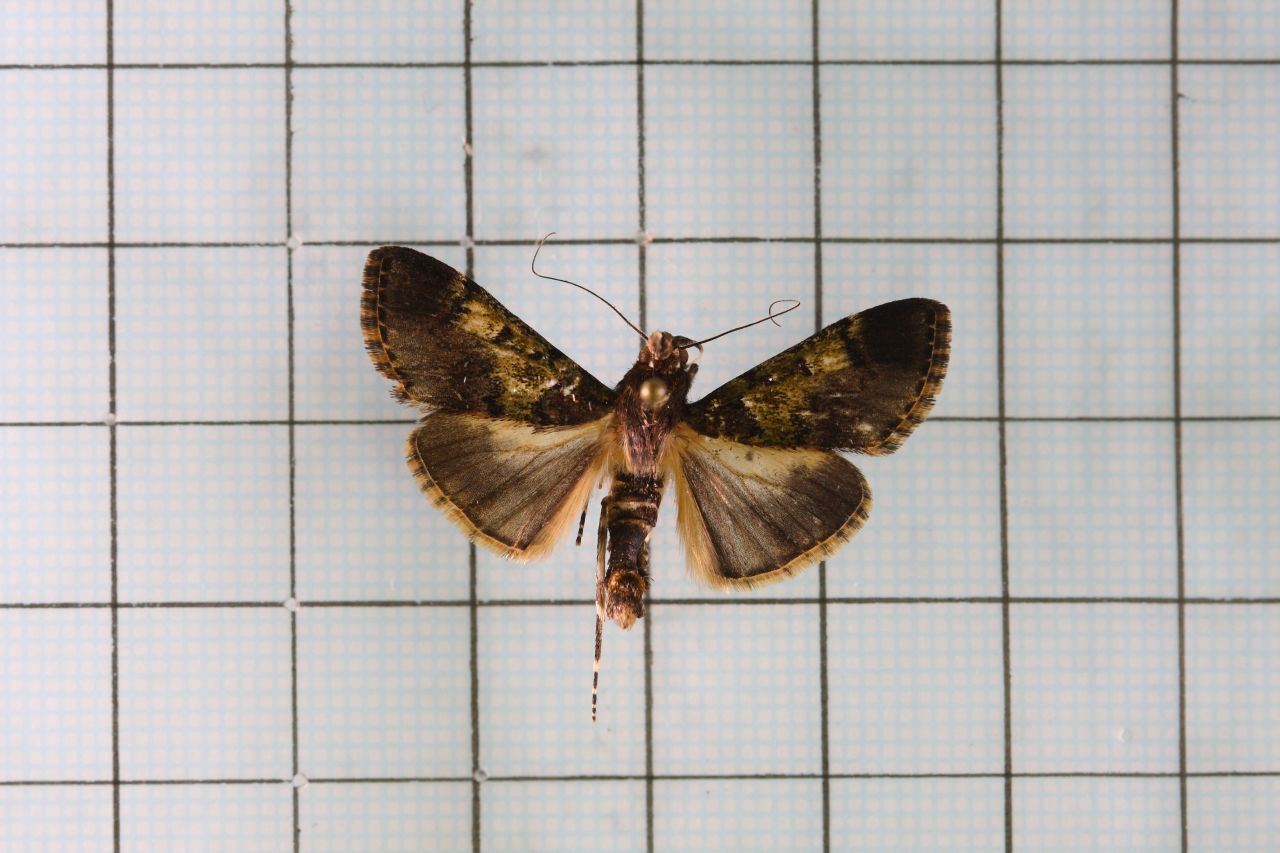
- Teliphasa elegans

Scientific classification
- Domain: Eukaryota
- Kingdom: Animalia
- Phylum: Arthropoda
- Class: Insecta
- Order: Lepidoptera
- Family: Pyralidae
- Subfamily: Epipaschiinae
- Genus: Teliphasa; Moore, 1888

Synonyms
- Sultania Koçak, 1987

= Teliphasa =

Genus of moths

Teliphasa is a genus of snout moths. It was erected by Frederic Moore in 1888.

== Species ==
- Teliphasa albifusa (Hampson, 1896)
- Teliphasa amica (Bulter, 1879)
- Teliphasa andrianalis Viette, 1960
- Teliphasa dibelana Ghesquière, 1942
- Teliphasa elegans (Butler, 1881)
- Teliphasa erythrina Li, 2016
- Teliphasa hamata Li, 2016
- Teliphasa lophotalis (Hampson, 1900)
- Teliphasa nubilosa Moore, 1888
- Teliphasa orbiculifer Moore, 1888
- Teliphasa sakishimensis Inoue & Yamanaka, 1975
- Teliphasa similalbifusa Li, 2016
- Teliphasa spinosa Li, 2016
