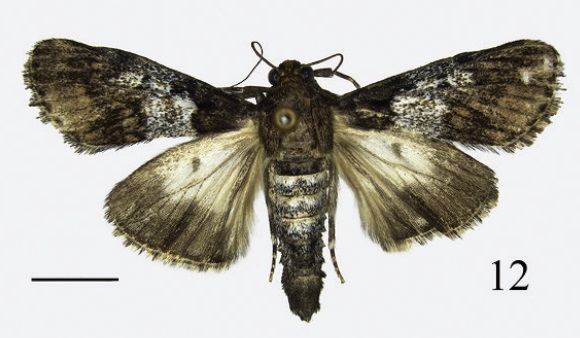

Scientific classification
- Domain: Eukaryota
- Kingdom: Animalia
- Phylum: Arthropoda
- Class: Insecta
- Order: Lepidoptera
- Family: Pyralidae
- Genus: Teliphasa
- Species: T. amica

Binomial name
- Teliphasa amica (Butler, 1879)

Synonyms
- Locastra amica Butler, 1879; Macalla amica

= Teliphasa amica =

Species of moth

Teliphasa amica is a species of moth of the family Pyralidae. It is found in mainland China (Fujian, Guangxi, Hebei, Henan, Hubei, Jiangxi, Sichuan, Shandong, Tianjin, Yunnan, Zhejiang), Taiwan, Korea and Japan.

The wingspan is 36–40 mm.
