= Auzata semipavonaria =

Scientific classification
- Kingdom: Animalia
- Phylum: Arthropoda
- Clade: Pancrustacea
- Class: Insecta
- Order: Lepidoptera
- Family: Drepanidae
- Genus: Auzata
- Species: A. semipavonaria

Binomial name
- Auzata semipavonaria Walker, 1862

Species of hook-tip moth

Auzata semipavonaria is a moth in the family Drepanidae. It was described by Francis Walker in 1862. It is found in northern India.

The wingspan is 38–51 mm (1.5–2.0 in) for males and 45–51 mm (1.8–2.0 in) for females.
