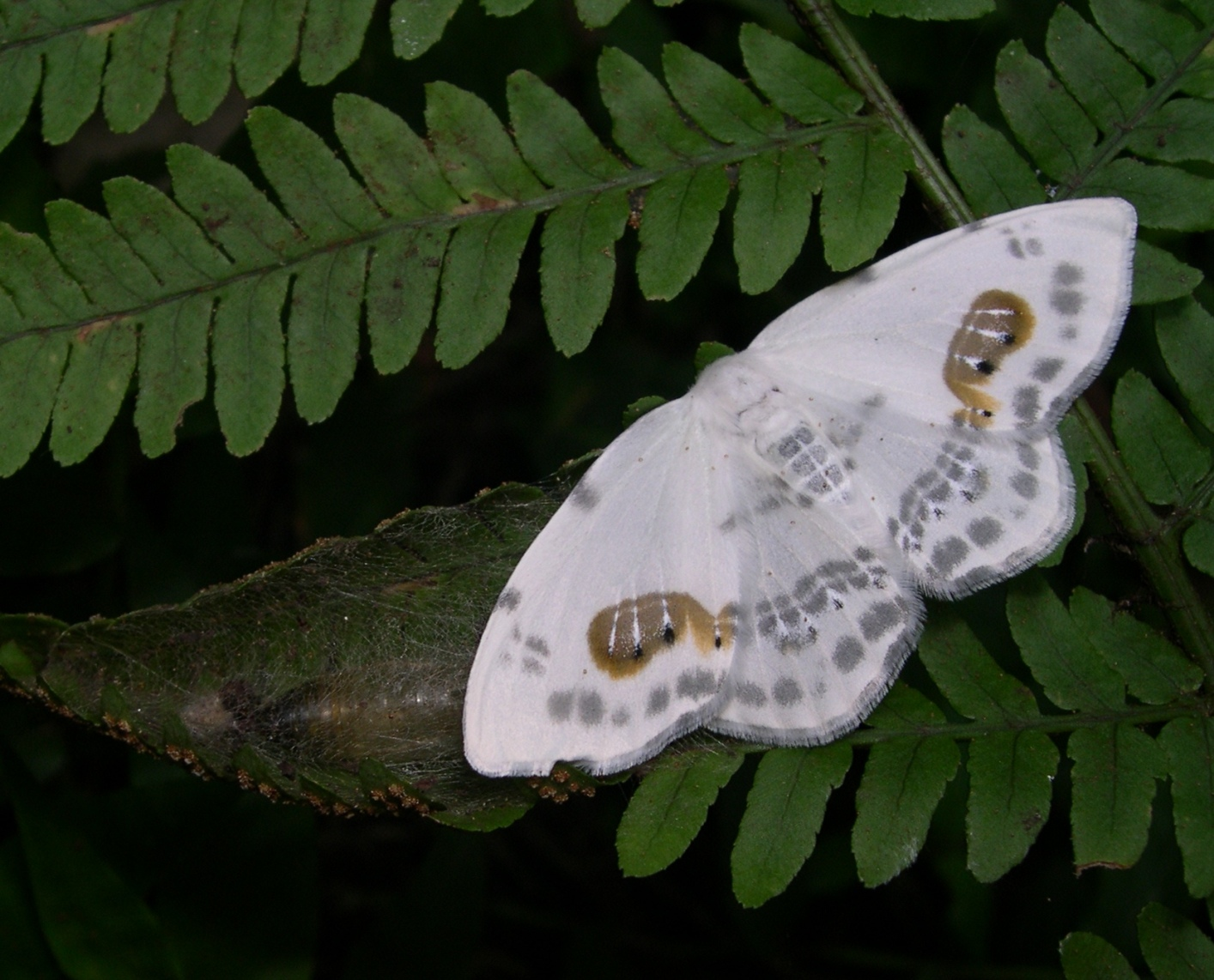

Scientific classification
- Domain: Eukaryota
- Kingdom: Animalia
- Phylum: Arthropoda
- Class: Insecta
- Order: Lepidoptera
- Family: Drepanidae
- Genus: Auzata
- Species: A. superba

Binomial name
- Auzata superba Butler, 1878

= Auzata superba =

Species of hook-tip moth

Auzata superba is a moth of the family Drepanidae first described by Arthur Gardiner Butler in 1878. It is found in Japan (Hokkaido, Honshu, Shikoku, Kyushu, Tsushima), the Korean Peninsula, Siberia and China.

The wingspan is about 40 mm.

The larvae feed on Cornus controversa and Cornus macrophylla.

== Subspecies ==
- Auzata superba superba
- Auzata superba cristata Watson, 1959 (China)
