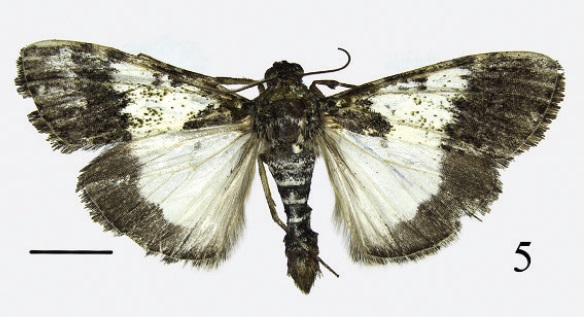

Scientific classification
- Domain: Eukaryota
- Kingdom: Animalia
- Phylum: Arthropoda
- Class: Insecta
- Order: Lepidoptera
- Family: Pyralidae
- Genus: Teliphasa
- Species: T. spinosa

Binomial name
- Teliphasa spinosa Li, 2016

= Teliphasa spinosa =

Species of moth

Teliphasa spinosa is a species of moth of the family Pyralidae. It is found in China (Yunnan).

The wingspan is 34–38 mm. The forewings are tinged with a pale olive-green luster, the basal area blackish brown, mixed with black and white scales, with two subrounded white spots near the base. The median area is white, with scattered pale brown and blackish brown scales, with dense brown and blackish brown scales from the costa diffused to above the cell, forming a narrow elongate dark streak. The distal area is deep brown, with black scales and the costa has a white spot at outside of the postmedian line, spreading to R5, mixed with pale brown. The antemedian line is black, extending from the costal one-fourth, obliquely inward to the scale tuft near the base, then obliquely outward to one-third on the dorsum. The postmedian line is black, extending from the costal two-thirds slightly oblique outward to R5, then running slightly oblique inward to the dorsal two-thirds, its inner margin more or less serrated. The discal spot is almost circular, smaller than the discocellular spot. The discocellular spot is nearly trapeziform and the terminal line is white, with ill-defined subrectangular black spots uniformly placed along its inner side, interrupted by greyish white mixed with blackish brown or brown scales at the veins. The hindwings have their basal three-fourths white, the distal one-fourth deep brown. The discocellular spot is pale greyish brown.

== Etymology ==
The species name refers to the juxta with clustered spines in the male genitalia and is derived from Latin spinosus (meaning with many spines).
