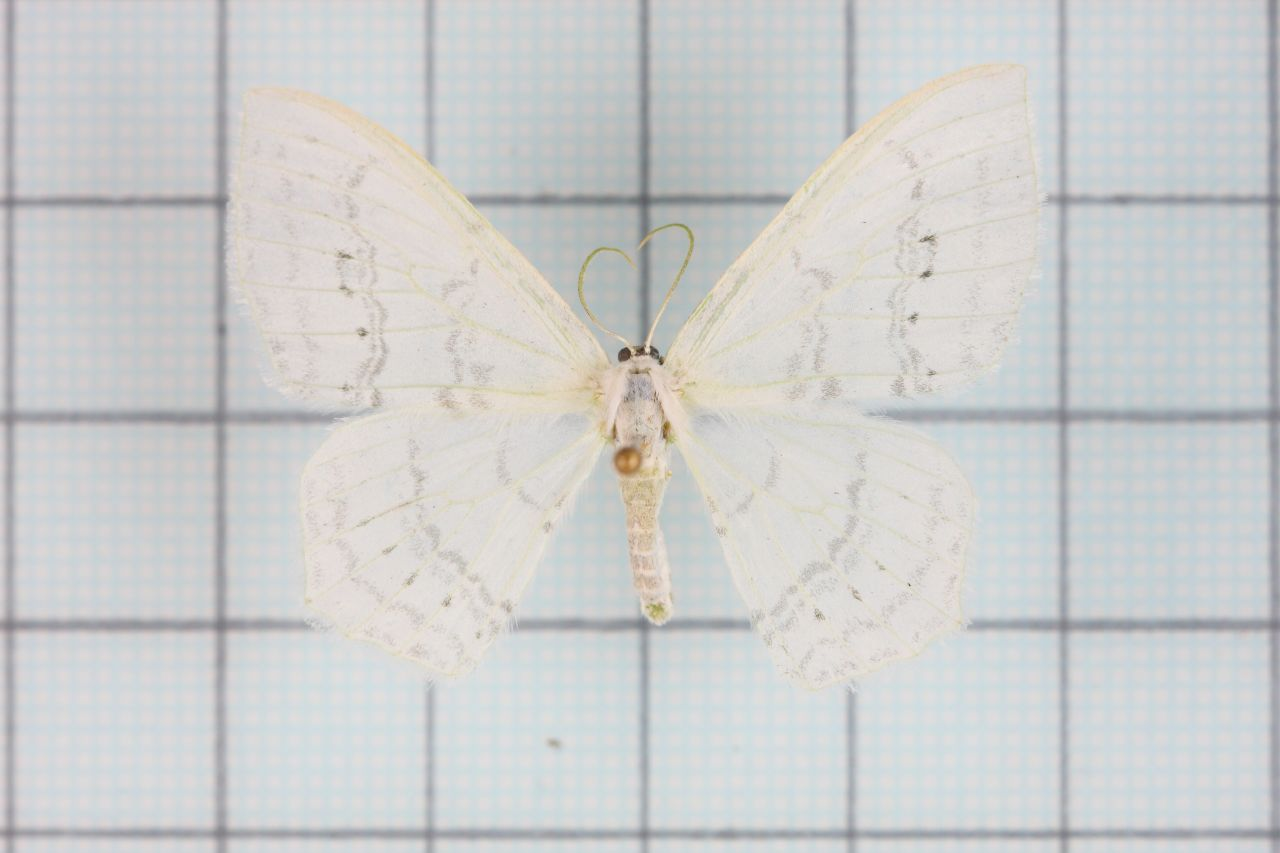

Scientific classification
- Domain: Eukaryota
- Kingdom: Animalia
- Phylum: Arthropoda
- Class: Insecta
- Order: Lepidoptera
- Family: Drepanidae
- Genus: Auzata
- Species: A. simpliciata

Binomial name
- Auzata simpliciata Warren, 1897

= Auzata simpliciata =

Species of hook-tip moth

Auzata simpliciata is a moth of the family Drepanidae first described by Warren in 1897. Its habitat is in northern India and the northern Yunnan province of China. and Taiwan.
