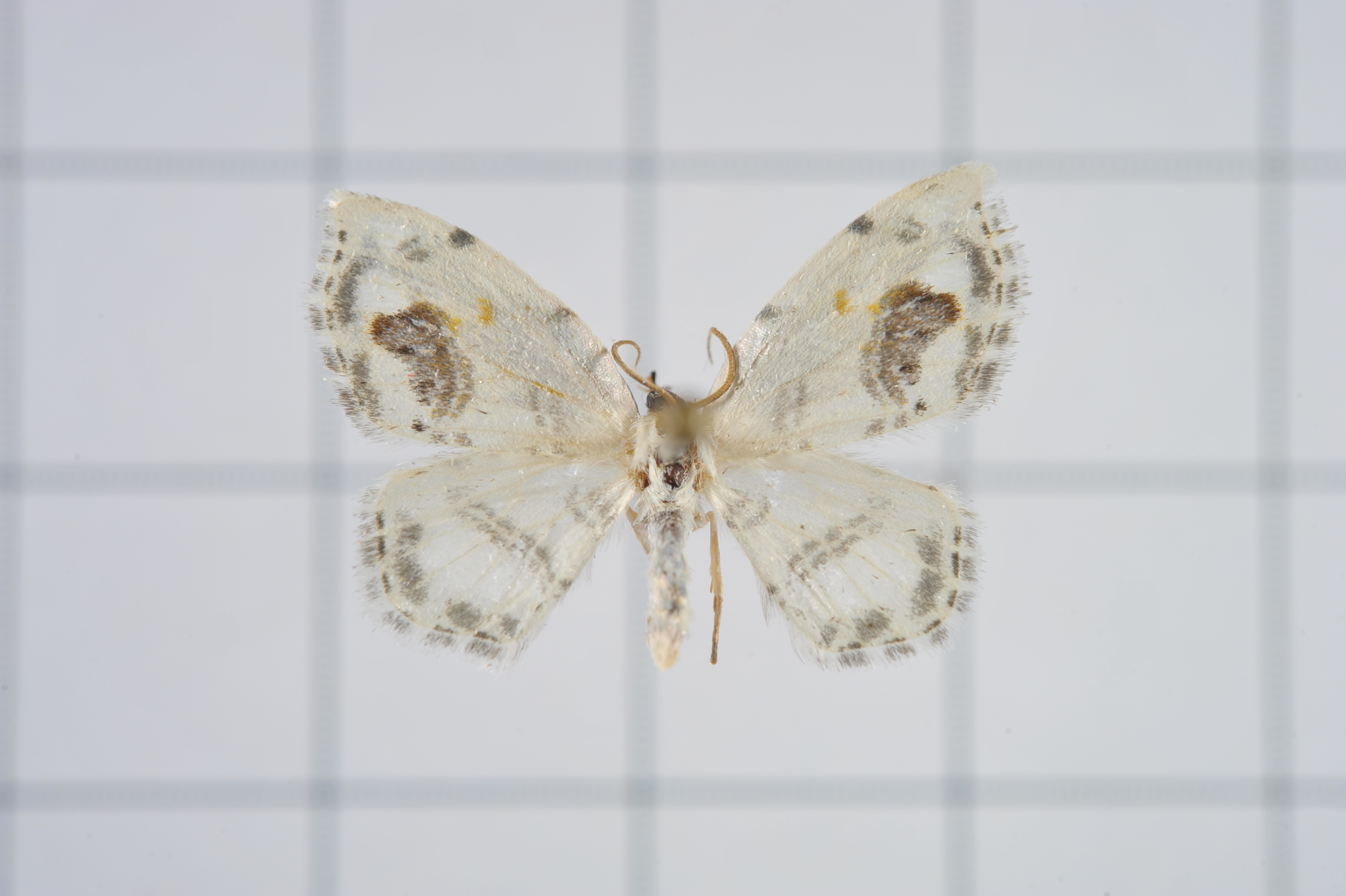

Scientific classification
- Domain: Eukaryota
- Kingdom: Animalia
- Phylum: Arthropoda
- Class: Insecta
- Order: Lepidoptera
- Family: Drepanidae
- Genus: Auzata
- Species: A. minuta

Binomial name
- Auzata minuta Leech, 1898

= Auzata minuta =

Species of hook-tip moth

Auzata minuta is a moth in the family Drepanidae. It was described by John Henry Leech in 1898. It is found in the Chinese provinces of Hubei, Sichuan, Guizhou, Yunnan, Zhejiang and Shanxi.

The wingspan is about 25 mm for males 28–30 mm for females. Adults are white, the forewings with a fuscous dot at the end of the cell and a fuscous-grey line beyond. The latter is angulated below the costa and then curved to the inner margin. In the hollow of this curve is a fuscous patch, tinged with ochreous and intersected by the white veins, which are here dotted with black. The subterminal band is fuscous grey, interrupted towards the costa. The hindwings have a double central line and a submarginal band, both fuscous grey. There are two dark dots beyond the central line and towards the abdominal margin.

== Subspecies ==
- Auzata minuta minuta (China: Hubei, Sichuan, Guizhou, Yunnan)
- Auzata minuta spiculata Watson, 1959 (China: Zhejiang, Shanxi)
