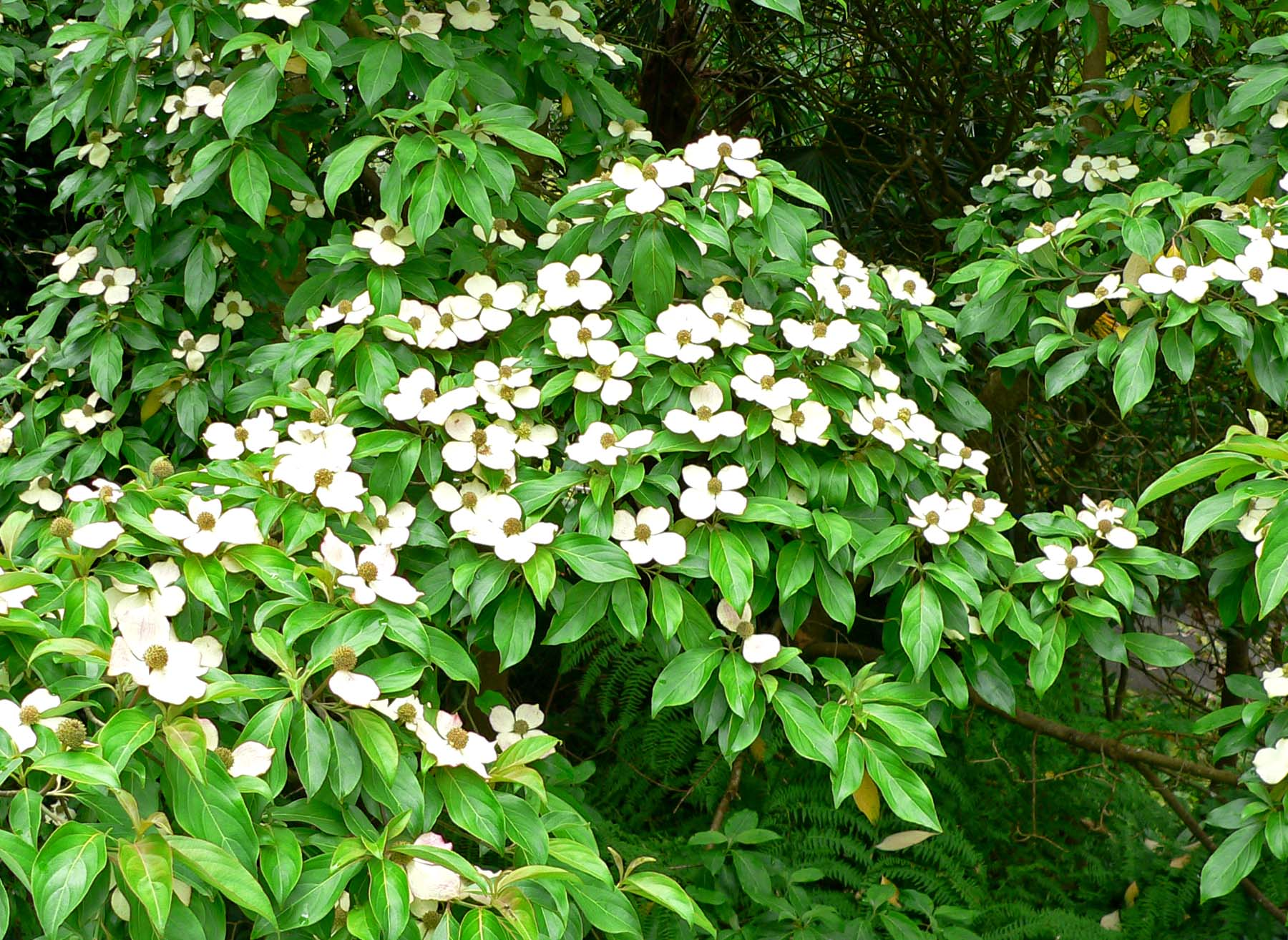

Conservation status
- Least Concern (IUCN 3.1)

Scientific classification
- Kingdom: Plantae
- Clade: Tracheophytes
- Clade: Angiosperms
- Clade: Eudicots
- Clade: Asterids
- Order: Cornales
- Family: Cornaceae
- Genus: Cornus
- Subgenus: Cornus subg. Syncarpea
- Species: C. capitata

Binomial name
- Cornus capitata Wall. ex Roxb.

Synonyms
- Benthamia fragifera Benthamidia capitata Dendrobenthamia capitata

= Cornus capitata =

Species of tree

Cornus capitata is an Asian species of dogwood known by the common names Bentham's cornel, evergreen dogwood, Himalayan flowering dogwood, and Himalayan strawberry-tree.

== Description ==
This is an evergreen tree growing to 12 metres (39 feet) in height and width. The leaves are gray-green and pale and fuzzy underneath, and several centimetres long. It flowers during the summer, with cymes of white bracts supporting small greenish flowers. The infructescence is a small aggregate of several individual fruits fused into a red body 2 or 3 cm (3/4 or 1 1/4 in) across.

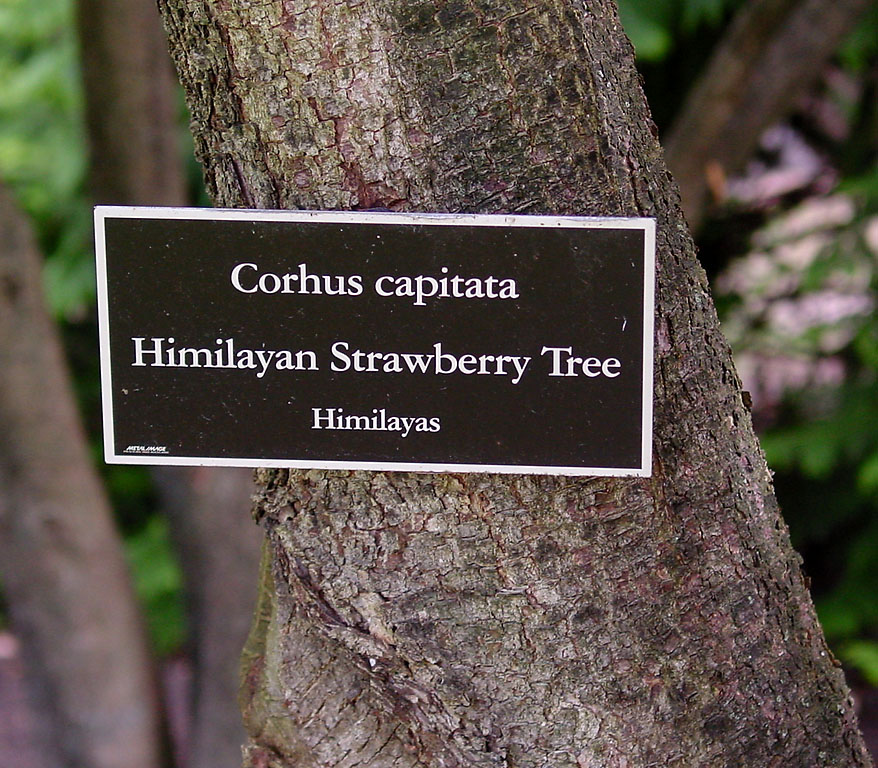
Bark

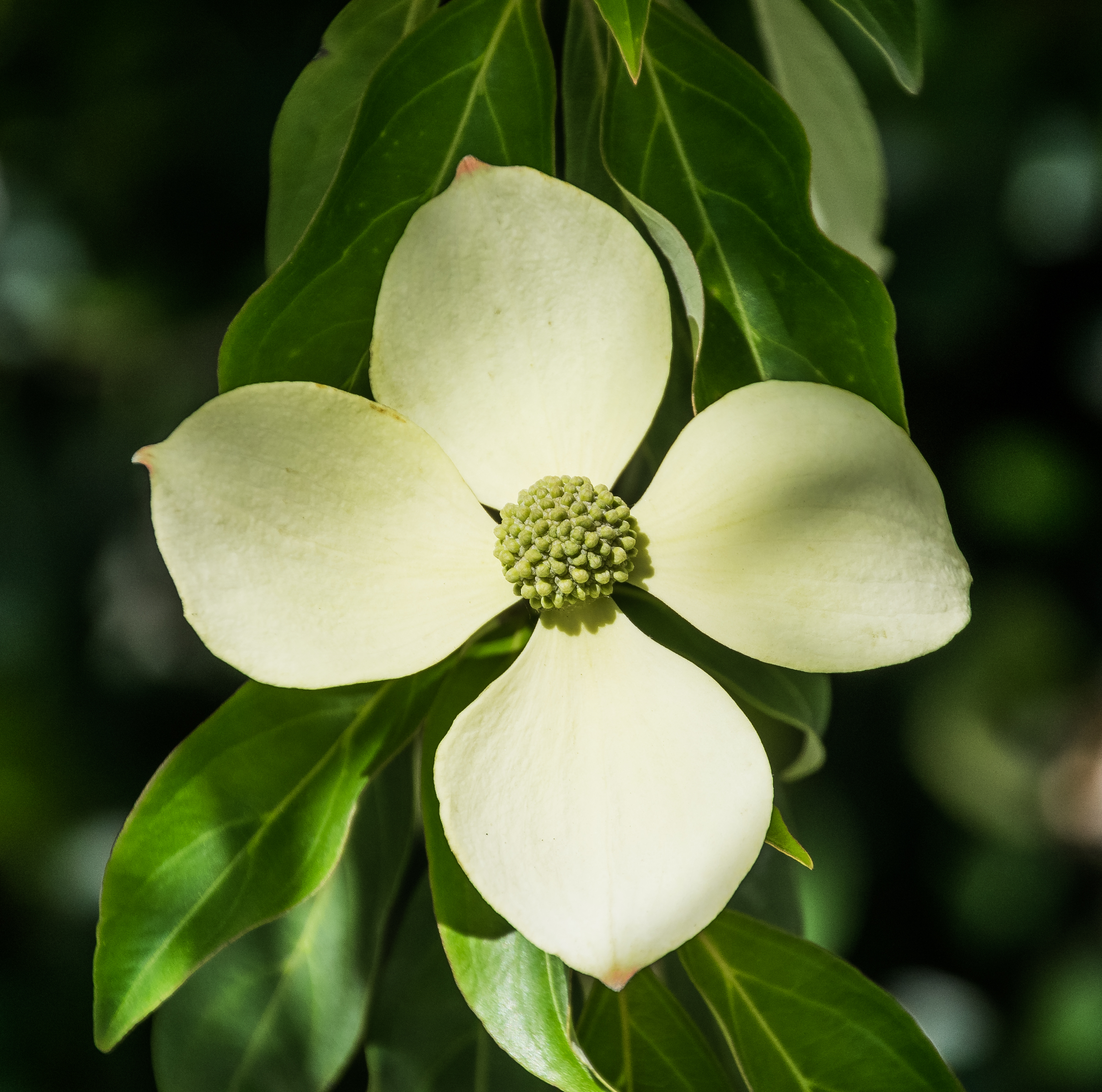
White bracts and small greenish flowers

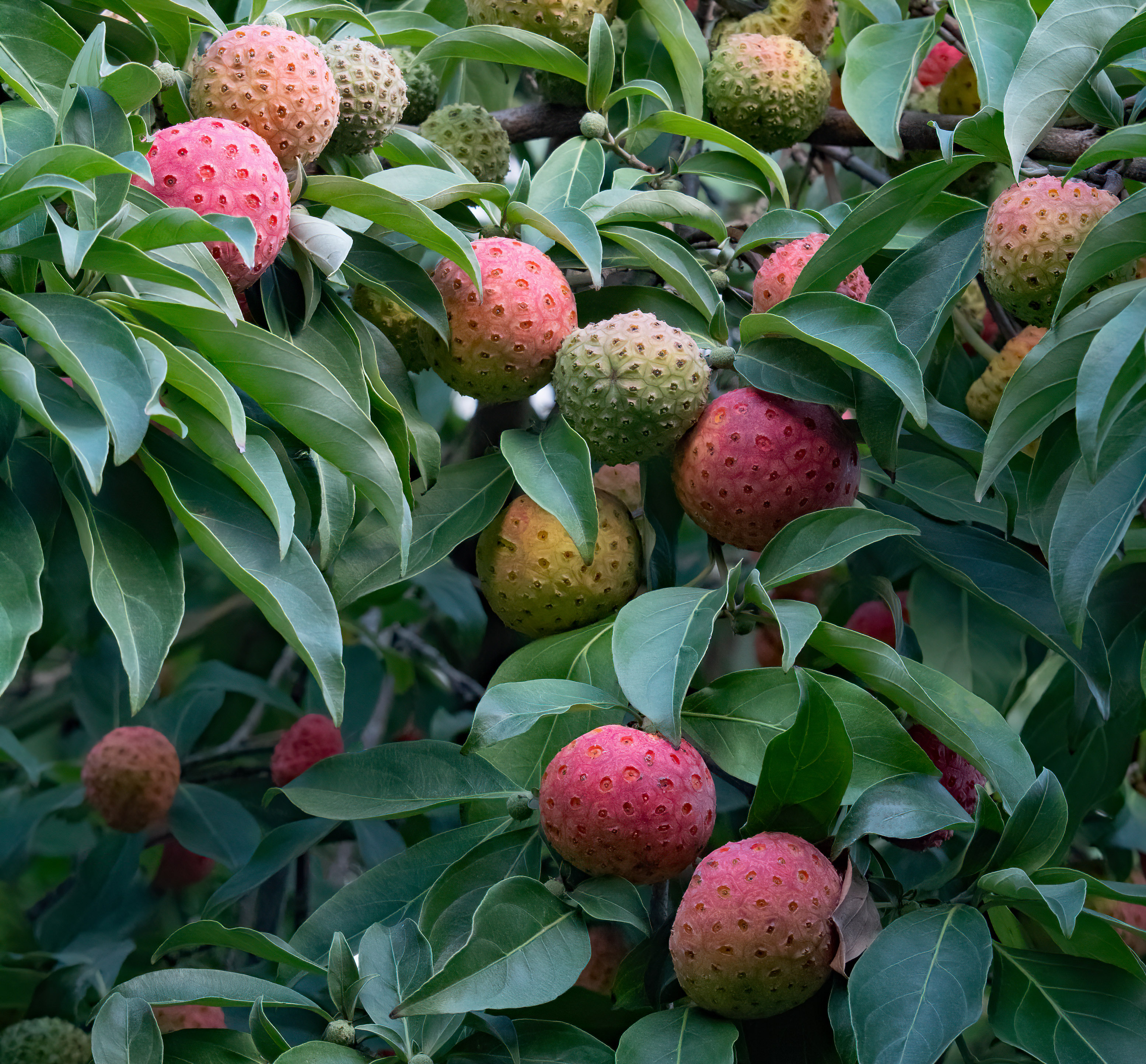
Fruit

== Taxonomy ==
There are several varieties and hybrids.

The common name Bentham's cornel derives from the alternative label Benthamia fragifera, coined by John Lindley in honour of fellow botanist George Bentham.

== Distribution and habitat ==
It is native to the low-elevation woodlands of the Himalayas in China, India, Pakistan, Nepal, and Bhutan. It is naturalized in parts of Australia and New Zealand, but is also grown elsewhere as an ornamental.

The species is naturalised in the states of New South Wales and Victoria in Australia.

== Uses ==
The fruit is edible but usually bitter.
