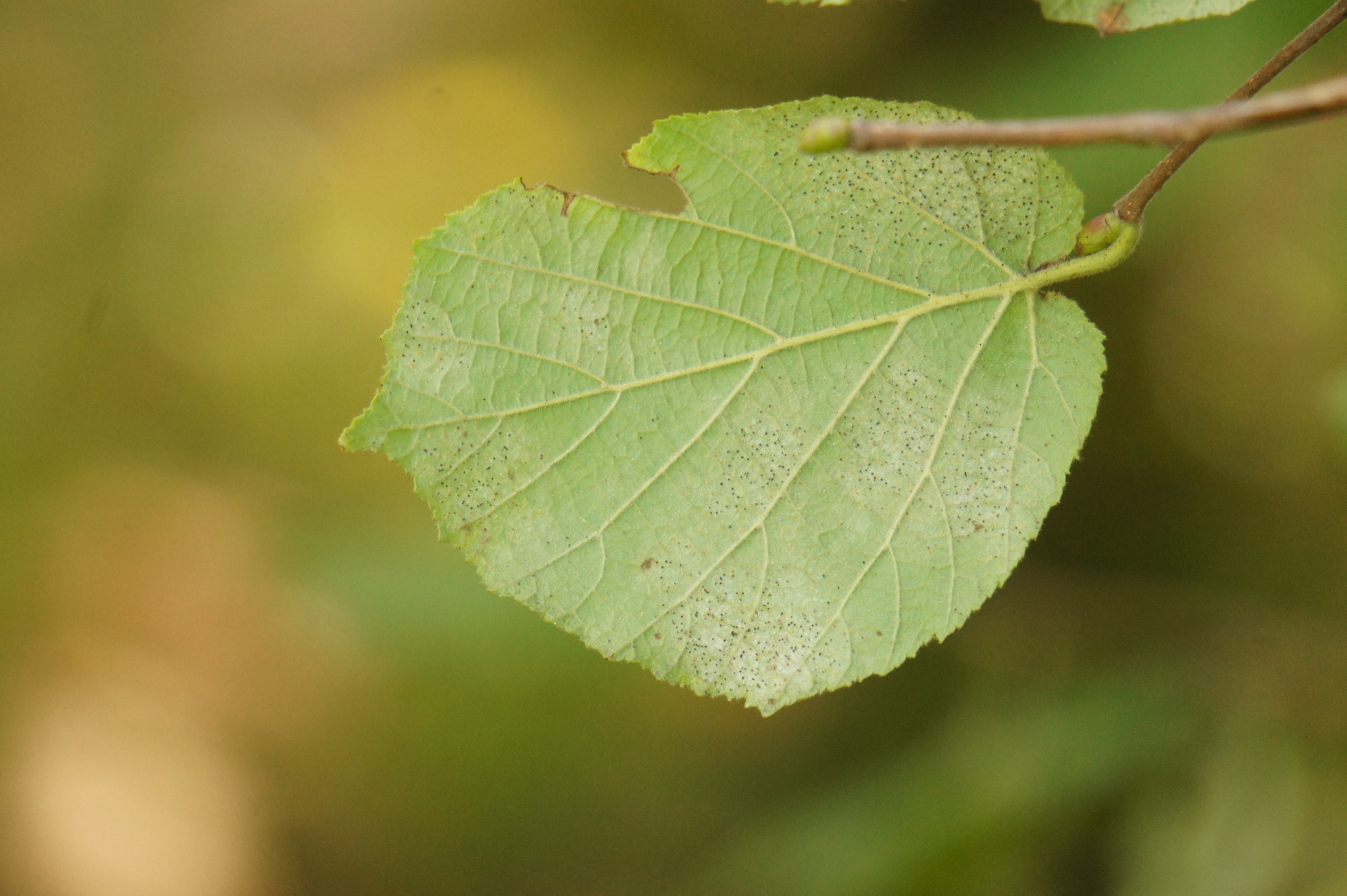
- Phyllactinia guttata on Corylus avellana

Scientific classification
- Kingdom: Fungi
- Division: Ascomycota
- Class: Leotiomycetes
- Order: Helotiales
- Family: Erysiphaceae
- Genus: Phyllactinia
- Species: P. guttata

Binomial name
- Phyllactinia guttata (Wallr.) Lév., 1851

Synonyms
- List: Alphitomorpha guttata Wallr., 1819; Erysibe coryli (DC.) Mussat, 1901; Erysibe guttata var. coryli (DC.) Link, 1833; Erysibe suffulta (Rebent.) 1901; Erysiphe coryli DC., 1805; Erysiphe guttata (Wallr.) Link, 1824; Erysiphe guttata f. corylea (DC.) Fr., 1829; Erysiphe guttata var. coryli Link, 1824; Erysiphe suffultum (Rebent.) Nees, 1816; Erysiphe varium var. suffultum (Rebent.) Fr., 1815; Phyllactinia corylea (Pers.) P. Karst., 1900; Phyllactinia suffulta (Rebent.) Sacc., 1880; Sclerotium erysiphe ß corylea Pers., 1796; Sclerotium suffultum Rebent., 1804

= Phyllactinia guttata =

Species of fungus

Phyllactinia guttata is a species of powdery mildew fungus in the family Erysiphaceae. A plant parasite, it infects the undersides of leaves of Corylus species (hazels) throughout temperate regions of the world.

== Taxonomy ==
Originally named in 1801 as Sclerotium erysiphe by Christian Hendrik Persoon, the species went through a number of name changes in the 1800s. Salmon's 1900 monograph on the Erysiphaceae established the name as Phyllactinia corylea for roughly half a century, until the starting date for the naming of fungi was moved, and the name was established as Phyllactinia guttata.

== Description ==
The mycelium may be abundant and persistent, or scant and short-lived (evanescent). The cleistothecia can become large (216–245 μm), with soft wall tissue, and obscure cellular structure and cracks and wrinkles (reticulations).

The cleistothecia typically develop 8–12 easily detachable hyaline appendages that vary in length from 191–290 μm long. The asci are 4 to 5 to 20 or more, ovate, supported by small stalk-like structures (pedicellate), with dimensions of 72–83 by 32–40 μm. There are typically two spores per ascus, sometimes three or four, and they are 31–36 by 21–25 μm.

The cells attached to the upper part of the ascomata that resemble hairs are known as penicillate cells; they are made of foots and filaments. The filaments can gelatinize by absorbing water and are thought to function in helping the ascomata adhere to the surface on which they grow, like the underside of leaves. In P. guttata, the foots are cylindrical, irregular in width, 32–72 by 7.5–25 μm, and divided into 2–10 branchlets in the upper part. Each branchlet is short, bulbous, with filaments being 20–42 μm, somewhat shorter than the foots, which are 2–4 μm wide. The short, bulbous branchlets on the multi-branched upper part of the foots are unique among the Phyllactinia and are a distinguishing taxonomic characteristic of this species.

== Ecology ==
P. guttata is a host for the fungicolous hyphomycete Cladosporium uredinicola.
