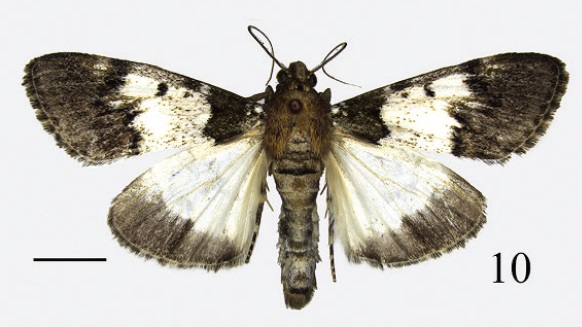

Scientific classification
- Kingdom: Animalia
- Phylum: Arthropoda
- Class: Insecta
- Order: Lepidoptera
- Family: Pyralidae
- Genus: Teliphasa
- Species: T. albifusa

Binomial name
- Teliphasa albifusa (Hampson, 1896)

Synonyms
- Macalla albifusa Hampson, 1896

= Teliphasa albifusa =

Species of moth

Teliphasa albifusa is a species of moth of the family Pyralidae. It is found in China (Fujian, Guangxi, Hebei, Henan, Hubei, Hunan, Shanxi, Sichuan, Tianjin, Yunnan, Zhejiang), Taiwan, Japan, Korea and India (Sikkim, Nagas).

The wingspan is 34–38 mm.
