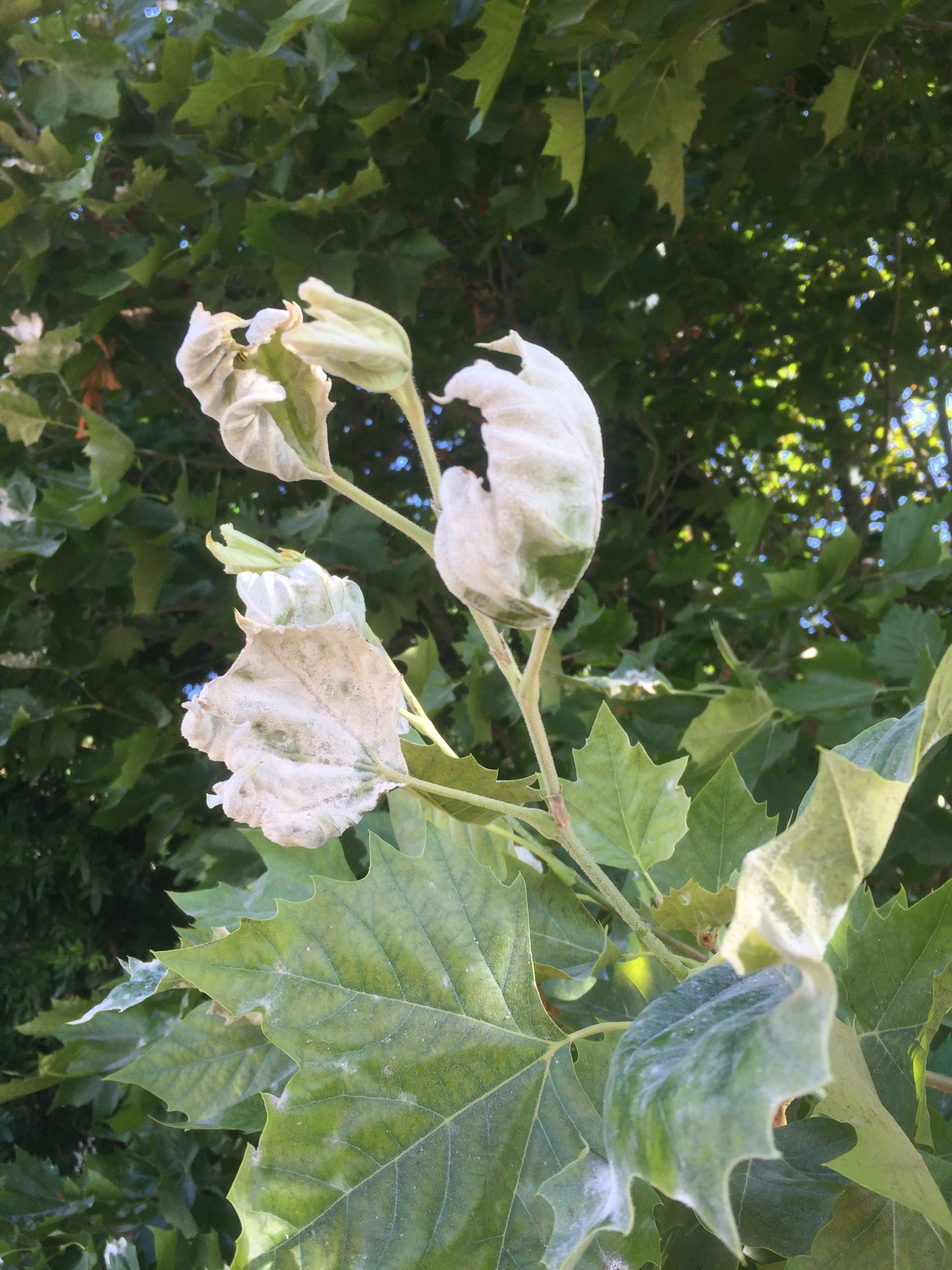
- Sycamore powdery mildew, Western Cape, South Africa

Scientific classification
- Kingdom: Fungi
- Division: Ascomycota
- Class: Leotiomycetes
- Order: Helotiales
- Family: Erysiphaceae
- Genus: Erysiphe
- Species: E. platani

Binomial name
- Erysiphe platani (Howe) U.Braun & S.Takam. (2000)

Synonyms
- Microsphaera platani Howe (1874)

= Erysiphe platani =

Species of fungus

Erysiphe platani, also known as sycamore powdery mildew, is a fungus native to North America that now infects sycamore tree species worldwide. Infections may spread rapidly in urban settings with large groups of young trees or in plant nurseries. This mildew thrives when there are high humidity conditions during the growing season.

Symptomatic trees show leaf discoloration and puckering as the mildew spreads across buds and leaf surfaces. The most visible effects, which include "leaf curling, stunting, and distortion," appear on vulnerable newly emerged leaves. This infection only appears on leaves, it has no obvious effect on stems and branches. Fertilization and pollarding increase the number of young shoots, which are the parts of the trees most vulnerable to infection.
