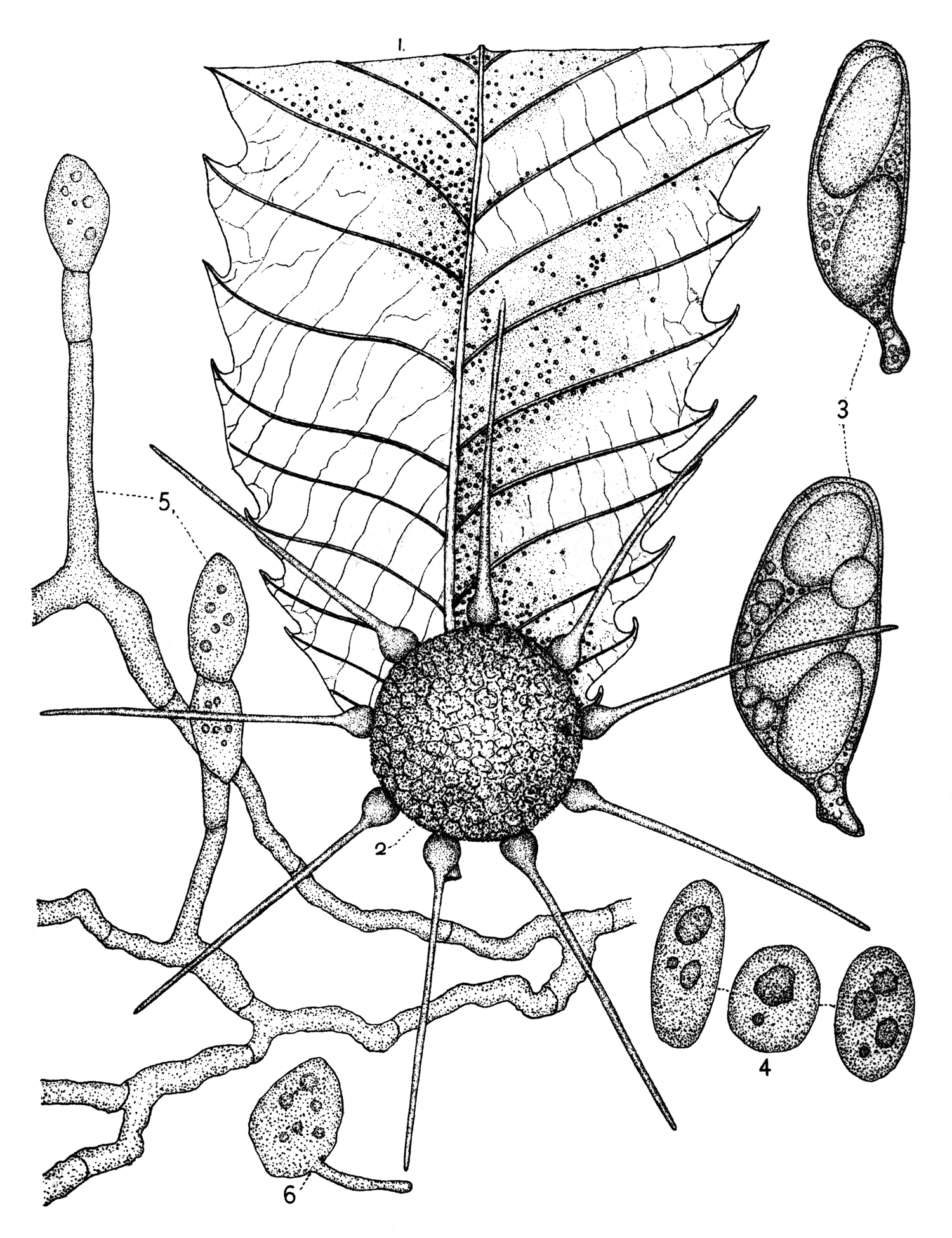
- Various stages in the life cycle of Phyllactinia guttata. Fig 1. Natural size, on chestnut leaf. 2. Perithecium enlarged. 3. Two asci. 4.Three spores. 5.Conidia-bearing hyphae. 6.Conidium germinating.

Scientific classification
- Kingdom: Fungi
- Division: Ascomycota
- Class: Leotiomycetes
- Order: Helotiales
- Family: Erysiphaceae
- Genus: Phyllactinia; Lév., 1851

Type species
- Phyllactinia guttata (Wallr.) Lév, 1851

= Phyllactinia =

Genus of fungi

Phyllactinia is a genus of plant pathogenic fungi in the family Erysiphaceae (powdery mildews).

== Species ==
- Phyllactinia aceris H.D. Shin & Y.J. La (1988)
- Phyllactinia actinidiae (Jacz.) Bunkina (1991)
- Phyllactinia adesmiae Havryl. (1995)
- Phyllactinia aesculi U. Braun (2012)
- Phyllactinia ailanthi Y.N. Yu & S.J. Han (1979)
- Phyllactinia alangii Y.X. Yu & Y.Q. Lai (1979)
- Phyllactinia aleuritis Y.X. Yu & Y.Q. Lai (1979)
- Phyllactinia alni Y.N. Yu & S.J. Han (1979)
- Phyllactinia alnicola U. Braun (2012)
- Phyllactinia ampelopsidis Y.X. Yu & Y.Q. Lai (1979)
- Phyllactinia amphipterygii U. Braun (2012)
- Phyllactinia ampulliformis Havryl. (1995)
- Phyllactinia andrachnes H.S. Gill, Munjal & Chona (1962)
- Phyllactinia angulata (E.S. Salmon) S. Blumer (1933)
- Phyllactinia babayanii Simonyan (1984)
- Phyllactinia bauhiniae Y.S. Paul (2009)
- Phyllactinia bougainvilleae Fern.-Pavía, Rodr.-Alv., M.G. Cabrera & U. Braun (2016)
- Phyllactinia braunii P. Kushwaha, Raghv. Singh, Chaurasia & Shambhu Kumar (2017)
- Phyllactinia brideliae B.V. Patil (1962)
- Phyllactinia broussonetiae-kaempferi Sawada (1930)
- Phyllactinia broussonetiae-papyriferae (Sawada) Meeboon & S. Takam. (2018)
- Phyllactinia caesalpiniae Y.N. Yu (1979)
- Phyllactinia calycanthi U. Braun (2012)
- Phyllactinia camptothecae Y.N. Yu (1979)
- Phyllactinia caricae (Sawada) U. Braun (2016)
- Phyllactinia caricicola (U. Braun) Liberato, R.W. Barreto & S. Takam. (2016)
- Phyllactinia carpinicola U. Braun & S. Takam. (2012)
- Phyllactinia cassiae G.J.M. Gorter & Eicker (1987)
- Phyllactinia cassiae-fistulae U. Braun & Y.S. Paul (2009)
- Phyllactinia catalpae U. Braun (2012)
- Phyllactinia celastri U. Braun (2012)
- Phyllactinia chubutiana Havryl., S. Takam. & U. Braun (2006)
- Phyllactinia coriariae D.Z. Xie (1990)
- Phyllactinia corni H.D. Shin & M.J. Park (2012)
- Phyllactinia corylopsidis Y.N. Yu & S.J. Han (1979)
- Phyllactinia cruchetii Bolay & U. Braun (2021)
- Phyllactinia dalbergiae Piroz. (1965)
- Phyllactinia desmodii J.F. Tao, J.Z. Qin & Y.Z. Shen (1980)
- Phyllactinia durantae (Liberato & R.W. Barreto) Liberato, R.W. Barreto & S. Takam. (2016)
- Phyllactinia ehretiae D.Z. Xie (1988)
- Phyllactinia elsholtziae Y.X. Yu (1979)
- Phyllactinia enkianthi Z.Y. Zhao (1985)
- Phyllactinia erythrinae-americanae Yáñez-Moral. & U. Braun (2009)
- Phyllactinia euodiae S.R. Yu (1993)
- Phyllactinia eupteleae U. Braun & S. Takam. (2012)
- Phyllactinia fraxini (DC.) Fuss (1878)
- Phyllactinia fraxinicola U. Braun & H.D. Shin (2012)
- Phyllactinia fraxini-longicuspidis M. Maeda, Meeboon & S. Takam. (2021)
- Phyllactinia gmelinae U. Braun & Bagyan. (1999)
- Phyllactinia gorteri Eicker (1988)
- Phyllactinia guttata (Wallr.) Lév. (1851)
- Phyllactinia hamamelidis U. Braun (2012)
- Phyllactinia hemipteleae H.D. Shin & U. Braun (2012)
- Phyllactinia heterophragmatis T.S. Ramakr. (1957)
- Phyllactinia holodisci U. Braun (2012)
- Phyllactinia indica Patw. (1962)
- Phyllactinia jamesiae U. Braun (2012)
- Phyllactinia japonica M. Maeda, Meeboon & S. Takam. (2021)
- Phyllactinia juglandis J.F. Tao & J.Z. Qin (1977)
- Phyllactinia juglandis-mandshuricae Y.X. Yu (1979)
- Phyllactinia kakiicola Sawada (1930)
- Phyllactinia kalopanacis U. Braun (2012)
- Phyllactinia kashmirensis A.K. Sharma (1986)
- Phyllactinia lagerstroemiae Meeboon & S. Takam. (2017)
- Phyllactinia lanneae P.B. Chavan & U.V. Kulk. (1975)
- Phyllactinia leveilluloides Moreno-Rico & U. Braun (2016)
- Phyllactinia lianyungangensis S.J. Gu & Y.S. Zhang (1998)
- Phyllactinia linderae Y.N. Yu & S.J. Han (1979)
- Phyllactinia liriodendri U. Braun (2012)
- Phyllactinia magnoliae Y.N. Yu & S.J. Han (1978)
- Phyllactinia magnoliae Y.N. Yu & Y.Q. Lai (1979)
- Phyllactinia mali (Duby) U. Braun (1978)
- Phyllactinia marissalii (Westend.) U. Braun (2012)
- Phyllactinia mimosae Marm., Siahaan, S. Takam. & U. Braun (2017)
- Phyllactinia miracula Y.S. Paul (1997)
- Phyllactinia mori-macrourae Meeboon & S. Takam. (2018)
- Phyllactinia nivea (Castagne) U. Braun (2012)
- Phyllactinia obclavata (Wakef.) U. Braun & S. Takam. (2016)
- Phyllactinia orbicularis (Ehrenb.) U. Braun (2012)
- Phyllactinia ostryae U. Braun (2012)
- Phyllactinia paliuri U. Braun (2012)
- Phyllactinia papayae (Van der Byl) U. Braun (2016)
- Phyllactinia parietariae U. Braun & Khodap. (2012)
- Phyllactinia paulowniae Y.N. Yu & S.J. Han (1979)
- Phyllactinia phaseolina N. Ahmad, D.K. Agarwal & A.K. Sarbhoy (1987)
- Phyllactinia philadelphi (Jacz.) Bunkina (1991)
- Phyllactinia pistaciae H.D. Shin & Y.J. Choi (2003)
- Phyllactinia poinsettiae Siahaan & S. Takam. (2015)
- Phyllactinia populi (Jacz.) Y.N. Yu (1979)
- Phyllactinia pteroceltidis Y.N. Yu & S.J. Han (1979)
- Phyllactinia pterostyracis Y.N. Yu & S.J. Han (1979)
- Phyllactinia pyri-communis Puzari & A.K. Sarbhoy (1996)
- Phyllactinia rhododendri H.D. Shin & Y.J. La (1988)
- Phyllactinia ribis (Jacz.) Z.Y. Zhao (1985)
- Phyllactinia robiniae U. Braun & Yáñez-Moral. (2009)
- Phyllactinia roboris (Gachet) S. Blumer (1933)
- Phyllactinia sabiae Zhi X. Chen & R.X. Gao (1982)
- Phyllactinia salicis (Jacz.) Bunkina (1991)
- Phyllactinia salmonii S. Blumer (1933)
- Phyllactinia sebastianiae M.G. Cabrera & Vobis (2011)
- Phyllactinia sinensis Y.N. Yu (1979)
- Phyllactinia syringae U. Braun, C. Blomquist, S.K. Mohan, H.J. Larsen, Patr. Woods & A.W. Ramaley (2017)
- Phyllactinia takamatsui Khodap. & A.H. Mohammadi (2016)
- Phyllactinia taurica (Lév.) M. Bradshaw, Khodap. & U. Braun, 2025
- Phyllactinia terminaliae T.S. Ramakr. (1957)
- Phyllactinia thirumalacharii Payak (1955)
- Phyllactinia toonae Y.X. Yu & Y.Q. Lai (1979)
- Phyllactinia tremae U. Braun (2012)
- Phyllactinia verruculosa D.Z. Xie (1992)
- Phyllactinia yarwoodii Patw. (1966)
- Phyllactinia zanthoxylicola U. Braun (2012)
