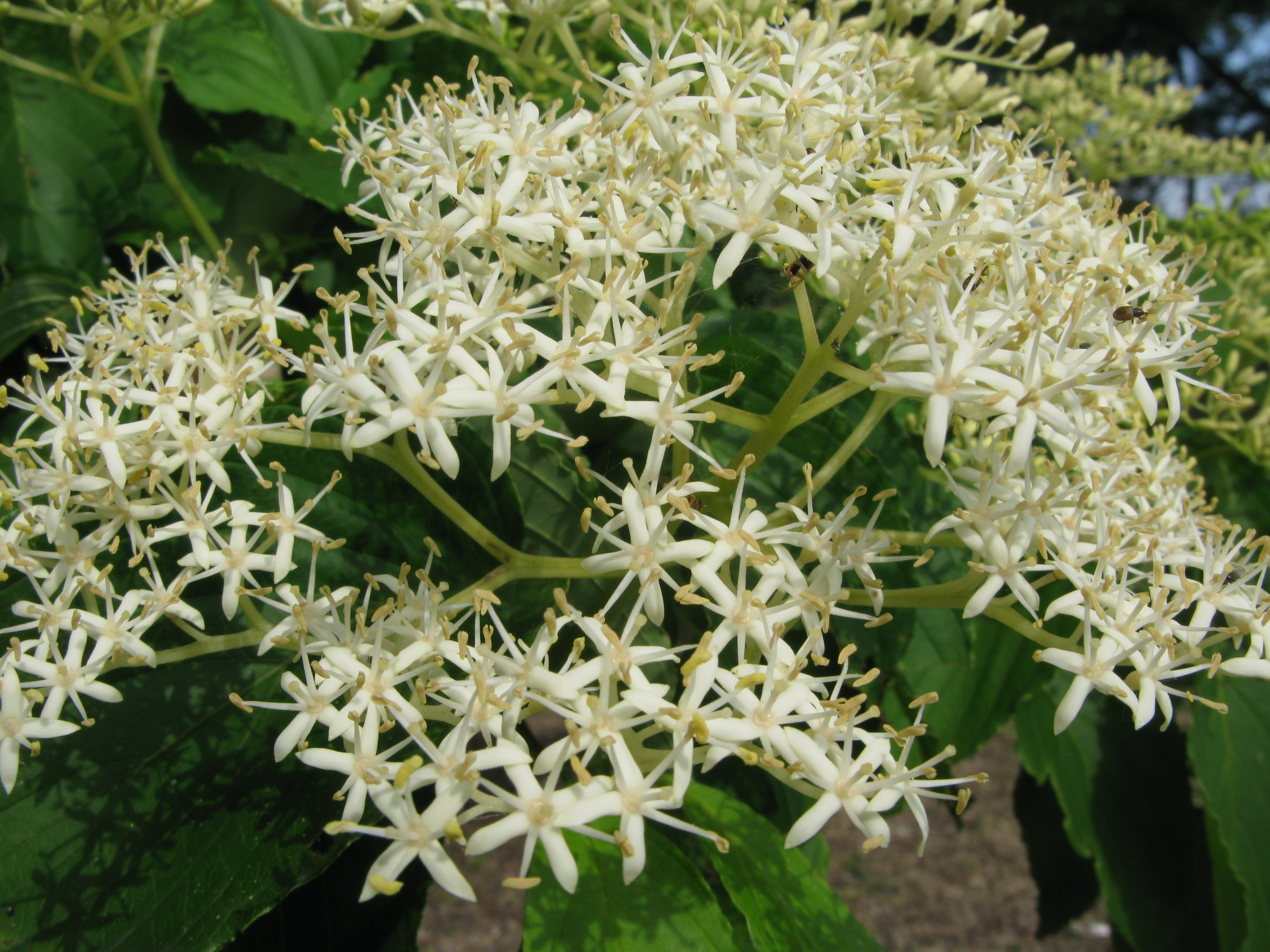

Scientific classification
- Kingdom: Plantae
- Clade: Tracheophytes
- Clade: Angiosperms
- Clade: Eudicots
- Clade: Asterids
- Order: Cornales
- Family: Cornaceae
- Genus: Cornus
- Subgenus: Cornus subg. Kraniopsis
- Species: C. macrophylla

Binomial name
- Cornus macrophylla Wallich in Roxburgh, 1820

= Cornus macrophylla =

Species of flowering plant

Cornus macrophylla, commonly known as the large-leafed dogwood, is a species of dogwood found in Afghanistan, Bhutan, India, Kashmir, Myanmar, Nepal, Pakistan, Taiwan, and several provinces in China, including Anhui, Fujian, Gansu, Guangdong, Guangxi, Guizhou, Hainan, Hubei, Hunan, Jiangsu, Jiangxi, Ningxia, Shaanxi, Shandong, Sichuan, Xizang, Yunnan, and Zhejiang.
