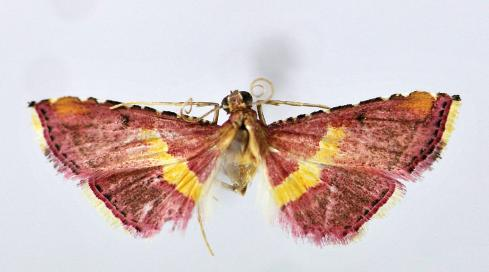

Scientific classification
- Kingdom: Animalia
- Phylum: Arthropoda
- Clade: Pancrustacea
- Class: Insecta
- Order: Lepidoptera
- Family: Pyralidae
- Genus: Endotricha
- Species: E. simipunicea

Binomial name
- Endotricha simipunicea Wang & Li, 2005

= Endotricha simipunicea =

Species of moth

Endotricha simipunicea is a species of snout moth in the genus Endotricha. It was described by Wang and Li, in 2005, and is known from China (Zhejiang, Fujian and Guizhou).

The wingspan is about 14 mm for males and 13.5−15 mm for females. The forewings are pink with scattered black scales. The apical angle is dotted with some yellow scales and the costal margin has a thin interrupted black-white line along the edge. The median band is yellow edged with white. The hindwing color and pattern is the same as the forewing.

== Etymology ==
The specific name is derived from the Latin simi- (meaning similar) and punicea the name of Endotricha punicea and refers to the similarity of the two species.
