= Endotrichini =

Scientific classification
- Kingdom: Animalia
- Phylum: Arthropoda
- Class: Insecta
- Order: Lepidoptera
- Family: Pyralidae
- Subfamily: Pyralinae
- Tribe: Endotrichini; Ragonot, 1890

Synonyms
- Endotrichinae

Tribe of moths

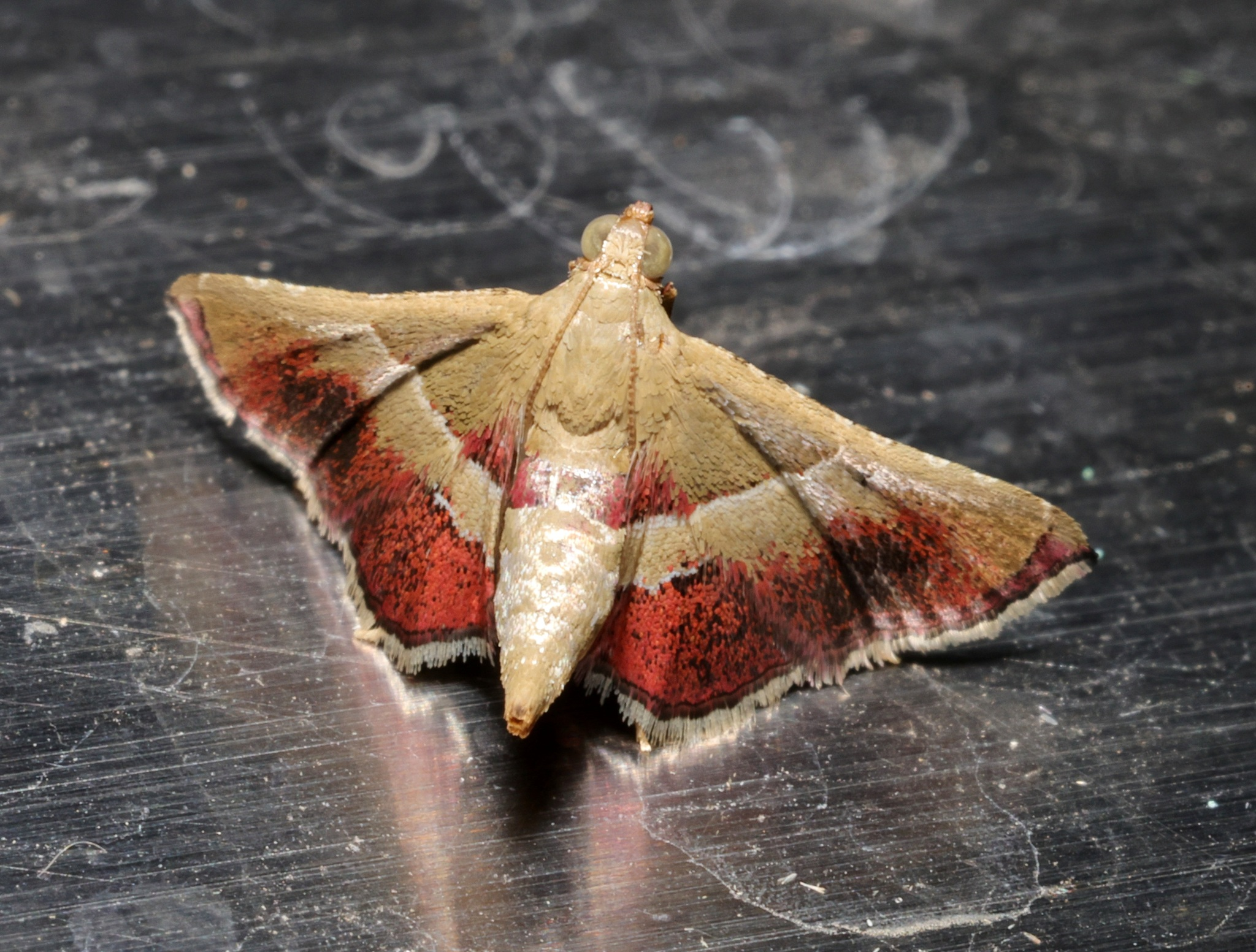
Endotricha repandalis

The Endotrichini are a tribe of moths of the family Pyralidae described by Émile Louis Ragonot in 1890.

== Genera ==
- Endosimilis Whalley, 1961
- Endotricha Zeller, 1847 (= Doththa Walker, 1859, Endotrichodes Ragonot, 1891, Endotrichopsis Warren, 1895, Messatis Walker, 1859, Pacoria Walker, 1866, Paconia Walker, 1866, Rhisina Walker, 1866)
- Larodryas Turner, 1922
- Oenogenes Meyrick, 1884
- Persicoptera Meyrick, 1884 (= Perisicoptera Neave, 1940)
