= Endotricha encaustalis =

Scientific classification
- Kingdom: Animalia
- Phylum: Arthropoda
- Clade: Pancrustacea
- Class: Insecta
- Order: Lepidoptera
- Family: Pyralidae
- Genus: Endotricha
- Species: E. encaustalis

Binomial name
- Endotricha encaustalis Hampson, 1916

Species of moth

Endotricha encaustalis is a species of snout moth in the genus Endotricha. It was described by George Hampson in 1916, and is known from New Guinea.
