= Endotricha vinolentalis =

Scientific classification
- Kingdom: Animalia
- Phylum: Arthropoda
- Clade: Pancrustacea
- Class: Insecta
- Order: Lepidoptera
- Family: Pyralidae
- Genus: Endotricha
- Species: E. vinolentalis

Binomial name
- Endotricha vinolentalis Ragonot, 1891

Species of moth

Endotricha vinolentalis is a species of snout moth in the genus Endotricha. It was described by Émile Louis Ragonot in 1891, and is known from Ivory Coast, Gambia, Cameroons, Sierra Leone, Ghana and Kenya.
