= Endotricha affinitalis =

Scientific classification
- Kingdom: Animalia
- Phylum: Arthropoda
- Clade: Pancrustacea
- Class: Insecta
- Order: Lepidoptera
- Family: Pyralidae
- Genus: Endotricha
- Species: E. affinitalis

Binomial name
- Endotricha affinitalis (Hering, 1901)

Synonyms
- Endotriche affinitalis Hering, 1901

Species of moth

Endotricha affinitalis is a species of snout moth in the genus Endotricha. It was described by Hering in 1901, and is known from Sumatra.
