= Endotricha melanchroa =

Scientific classification
- Kingdom: Animalia
- Phylum: Arthropoda
- Clade: Pancrustacea
- Class: Insecta
- Order: Lepidoptera
- Family: Pyralidae
- Genus: Endotricha
- Species: E. melanchroa

Binomial name
- Endotricha melanchroa Turner, 1911

Synonyms
- Endotricha sareochroa Hampson, 1916

Species of moth

Endotricha melanchroa is a species of snout moth in the genus Endotricha. It is found in northern and western Australia.
