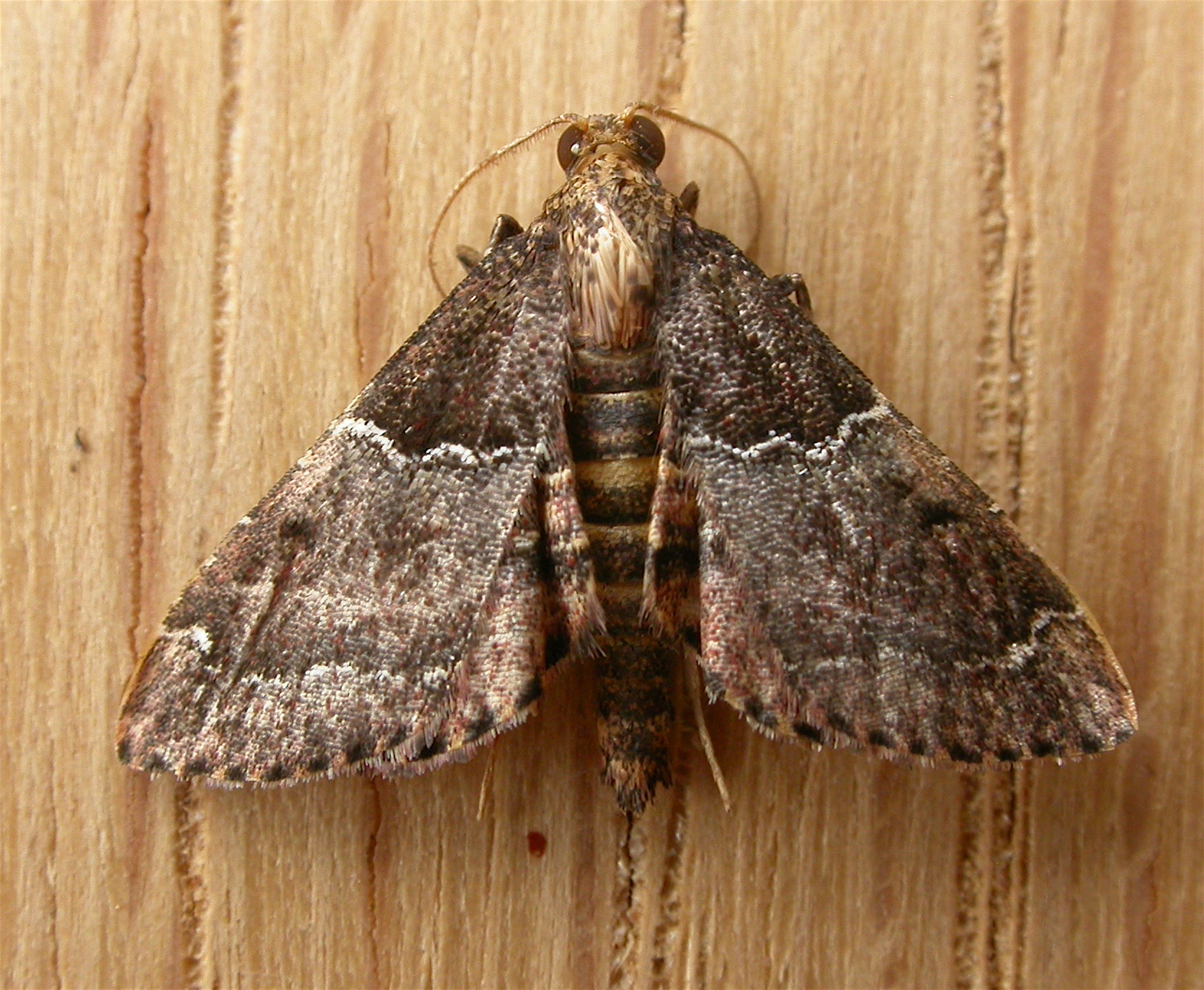
- Persicoptera compsopa

Scientific classification
- Kingdom: Animalia
- Phylum: Arthropoda
- Clade: Pancrustacea
- Class: Insecta
- Order: Lepidoptera
- Family: Pyralidae
- Subfamily: Pyralinae
- Tribe: Endotrichini
- Genus: Persicoptera; Meyrick, 1884

= Persicoptera =

Genus of moths

Persicoptera is a genus of moths in the family Pyralidae.

Species:

- Persicoptera aglaopa (Meyrick, 1887)
- Persicoptera baryptera (Lower, 1905)
- Persicoptera callimochla (Turner, 1932)
- Persicoptera compsopa (Meyrick, 1887)
- Persicoptera desmotoma (Lower, 1903)
- Persicoptera dinosticha (Turner, 1937)
- Persicoptera heterozyga Turner, 1937
- Persicoptera iochyta (Turner, 1911)
- Persicoptera pulchrinalis (Guenée, 1854)
- Persicoptera scioides (Turner, 1932)
