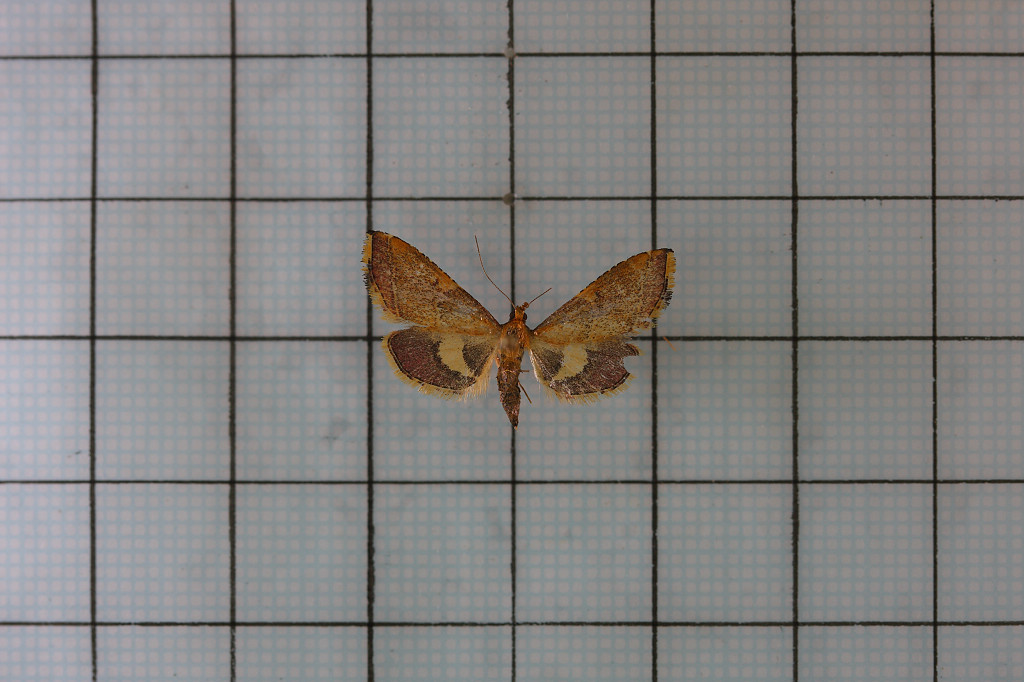

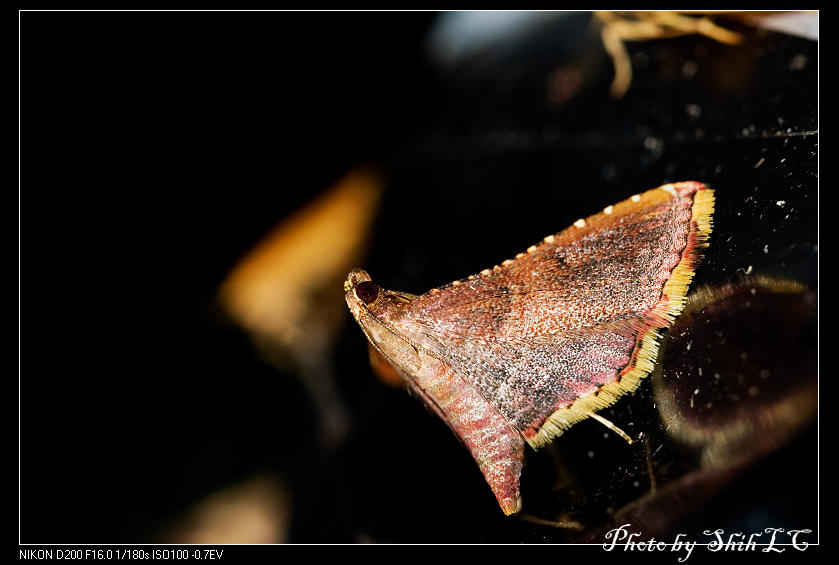

Scientific classification
- Kingdom: Animalia
- Phylum: Arthropoda
- Clade: Pancrustacea
- Class: Insecta
- Order: Lepidoptera
- Family: Pyralidae
- Genus: Endotricha
- Species: E. olivacealis

Binomial name
- Endotricha olivacealis (Bremer, 1864)

Synonyms
- Rhodaria olivacealis Bremer, 1864

= Endotricha olivacealis =

Species of moth

Endotricha olivacealis is a moth of the family Pyralidae. It is found in Russia, China, Korea, Japan, Taiwan, India, Malaysia and western Java.

The wingspan is 24–26 mm.
