= Endotricha dyschroa =

Scientific classification
- Kingdom: Animalia
- Phylum: Arthropoda
- Clade: Pancrustacea
- Class: Insecta
- Order: Lepidoptera
- Family: Pyralidae
- Genus: Endotricha
- Species: E. dyschroa

Binomial name
- Endotricha dyschroa Turner, 1918

Species of moth

Endotricha dyschroa is a species of snout moth in the genus Endotricha. It was described by Alfred Jefferis Turner in 1918, and is known from Norfolk Island.
