= Endotricha kuznetzovi =

Scientific classification
- Kingdom: Animalia
- Phylum: Arthropoda
- Clade: Pancrustacea
- Class: Insecta
- Order: Lepidoptera
- Family: Pyralidae
- Genus: Endotricha
- Species: E. kuznetzovi

Binomial name
- Endotricha kuznetzovi Whalley, 1963

Species of moth

Endotricha kuznetzovi is a species of snout moth in the genus Endotricha. It was described by Paul Ernest Sutton Whalley in 1963, and is known from China (Fujian, Hebei, Heilongjiang, Shanxi), Korea, southeastern Siberia and Japan.
