= Endotricha sondaicalis =

Scientific classification
- Kingdom: Animalia
- Phylum: Arthropoda
- Clade: Pancrustacea
- Class: Insecta
- Order: Lepidoptera
- Family: Pyralidae
- Genus: Endotricha
- Species: E. sondaicalis

Binomial name
- Endotricha sondaicalis Snellen, 1880

Species of moth

Endotricha sondaicalis is a species of snout moth in the genus Endotricha. It was described by Pieter Cornelius Tobias Snellen in 1880, and is known from Sulawesi.
