= Endotricha nigra =

Scientific classification
- Kingdom: Animalia
- Phylum: Arthropoda
- Clade: Pancrustacea
- Class: Insecta
- Order: Lepidoptera
- Family: Pyralidae
- Genus: Endotricha
- Species: E. nigra

Binomial name
- Endotricha nigra Wang & Li, 2005

Species of moth

Endotricha nigra is a species of snout moth in the genus Endotricha. It was described by Wang and Li, in 2005, and is known from China (Fujian, Guizhou).

The wingspan is 21–23 millimetres (0.83–0.91 in).

== Etymology ==
The specific name is derived from the Latin niger (meaning black) and refers to the wing color.
