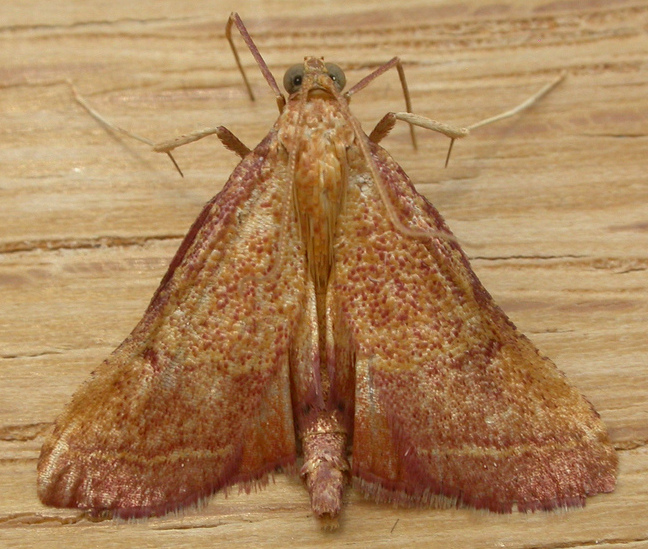

Scientific classification
- Kingdom: Animalia
- Phylum: Arthropoda
- Clade: Pancrustacea
- Class: Insecta
- Order: Lepidoptera
- Family: Pyralidae
- Genus: Endotricha
- Species: E. pyrosalis

Binomial name
- Endotricha pyrosalis Guenée, 1854

Synonyms
- Messatis sabirusalis Walker, 1859; Paconia albifimbrialis Walker, [1866]; Tricomia auroralis Walker, [1866]; Rhodaria robinia Butler, 1882

= Endotricha pyrosalis =

Species of moth

Endotricha pyrosalis is a moth of the family Pyralidae described by Achille Guenée in 1854. It is found in Australia and is common in Sydney and Melbourne.

The wingspan is about 20 mm.
