= Oenogenes fugalis =

Scientific classification
- Kingdom: Animalia
- Phylum: Arthropoda
- Clade: Pancrustacea
- Class: Insecta
- Order: Lepidoptera
- Family: Pyralidae
- Genus: Oenogenes
- Species: O. fugalis

Binomial name
- Oenogenes fugalis (Felder & Rogenhofer, 1875)

Synonyms
- Botys fugalis Felder & Rogenhofer, 1875

Species of moth

Oenogenes fugalis is a species of snout moth in the genus Oenogenes. It was described by Rudolf Felder and Alois Friedrich Rogenhofer in 1875 and is found in Australia.
