= Endotricha coreacealis =

Scientific classification
- Kingdom: Animalia
- Phylum: Arthropoda
- Clade: Pancrustacea
- Class: Insecta
- Order: Lepidoptera
- Family: Pyralidae
- Genus: Endotricha
- Species: E. coreacealis

Binomial name
- Endotricha coreacealis Pagenstecher, 1884

Species of moth

Endotricha coreacealis is a species of snout moth in the genus Endotricha. It was described by Arnold Pagenstecher in 1884, and is known from Amboina and New Guinea.
