= Endotricha albicilia =

Scientific classification
- Kingdom: Animalia
- Phylum: Arthropoda
- Clade: Pancrustacea
- Class: Insecta
- Order: Lepidoptera
- Family: Pyralidae
- Genus: Endotricha
- Species: E. albicilia

Binomial name
- Endotricha albicilia Hampson, 1891

Species of moth

Endotricha albicilia is a species of snout moth in the genus Endotricha. It was described by George Hampson in 1891, and is known from India, Sri Lanka and the Andamans.
