= Endotricha purpurata =

Scientific classification
- Kingdom: Animalia
- Phylum: Arthropoda
- Clade: Pancrustacea
- Class: Insecta
- Order: Lepidoptera
- Family: Pyralidae
- Genus: Endotricha
- Species: E. purpurata

Binomial name
- Endotricha purpurata Wang & Li, 2005

Species of moth

Endotricha purpurata is a species of snout moth in the genus Endotricha. It was described by Wang and Li, in 2005, and is known from China (Guizhou).

The wingspan is about 18 mm.
