= Endotricha psammitis =

Scientific classification
- Kingdom: Animalia
- Phylum: Arthropoda
- Clade: Pancrustacea
- Class: Insecta
- Order: Lepidoptera
- Family: Pyralidae
- Genus: Endotricha
- Species: E. psammitis

Binomial name
- Endotricha psammitis Turner, 1904

Synonyms
- Endotricha lignitalis Hampson, 1916

Species of moth

Endotricha psammitis is a species of snout moth in the genus Endotricha. It is found in Australia, the Selayar Islands and Tambora Island.
