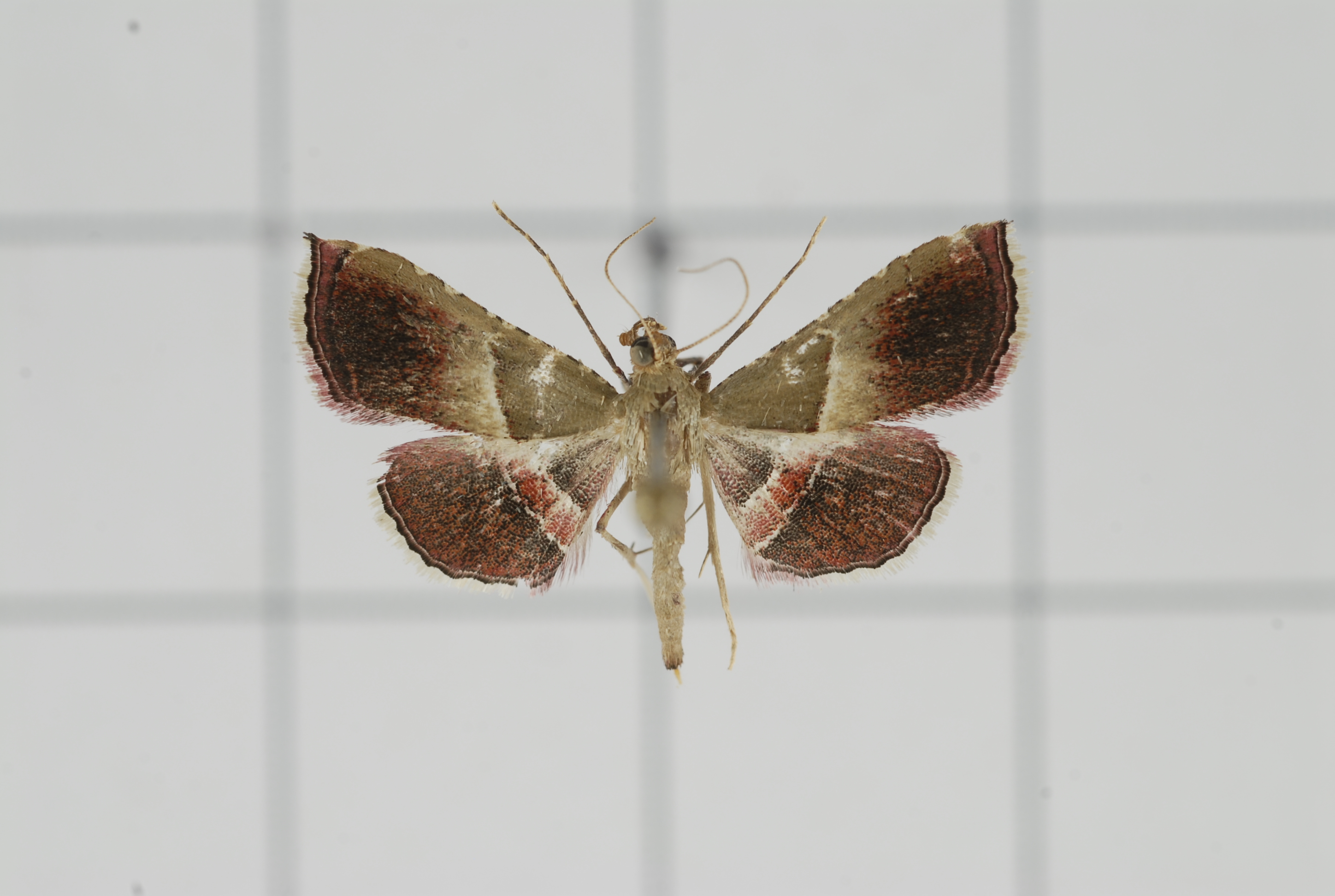

Scientific classification
- Kingdom: Animalia
- Phylum: Arthropoda
- Clade: Pancrustacea
- Class: Insecta
- Order: Lepidoptera
- Family: Pyralidae
- Genus: Endotricha
- Species: E. ruminalis

Binomial name
- Endotricha ruminalis (Walker, 1859)

Synonyms
- Agroptera ruminalis Walker, 1859; Pyralis ibycusalis Walker, 1859; Endotricha symphonialis Hampson, 1893

= Endotricha ruminalis =

Species of moth

Endotricha ruminalis is a species of snout moth in the genus Endotricha. It was described by Francis Walker in 1859, and is known from India, Sri Lanka, Malaysia and Taiwan.
