= Endotricha thermidora =

Scientific classification
- Kingdom: Animalia
- Phylum: Arthropoda
- Clade: Pancrustacea
- Class: Insecta
- Order: Lepidoptera
- Family: Pyralidae
- Genus: Endotricha
- Species: E. thermidora

Binomial name
- Endotricha thermidora Hampson, 1916

Species of moth

Endotricha thermidora is a species of snout moth in the genus Endotricha. It was described by George Hampson in 1916, and is known from New Guinea, Admiralty Island, Yamma Island, the Solomon Islands, New Hannover, Dampier Island, New Britain, and Sudest Island.
