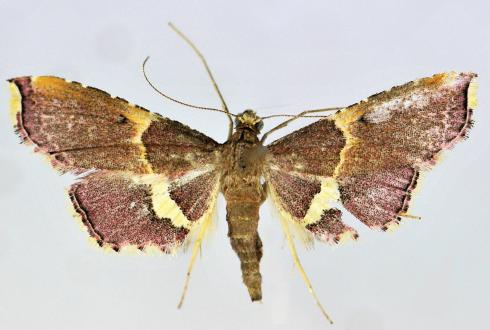

Scientific classification
- Kingdom: Animalia
- Phylum: Arthropoda
- Clade: Pancrustacea
- Class: Insecta
- Order: Lepidoptera
- Family: Pyralidae
- Genus: Endotricha
- Species: E. hoenei

Binomial name
- Endotricha hoenei Whalley, 1963

= Endotricha hoenei =

Species of moth

Endotricha hoenei is a species of snout moth in the genus Endotricha. It is found in China (Guangdong, Fujian and Guangxi).

The wingspan is 19−21 mm.
