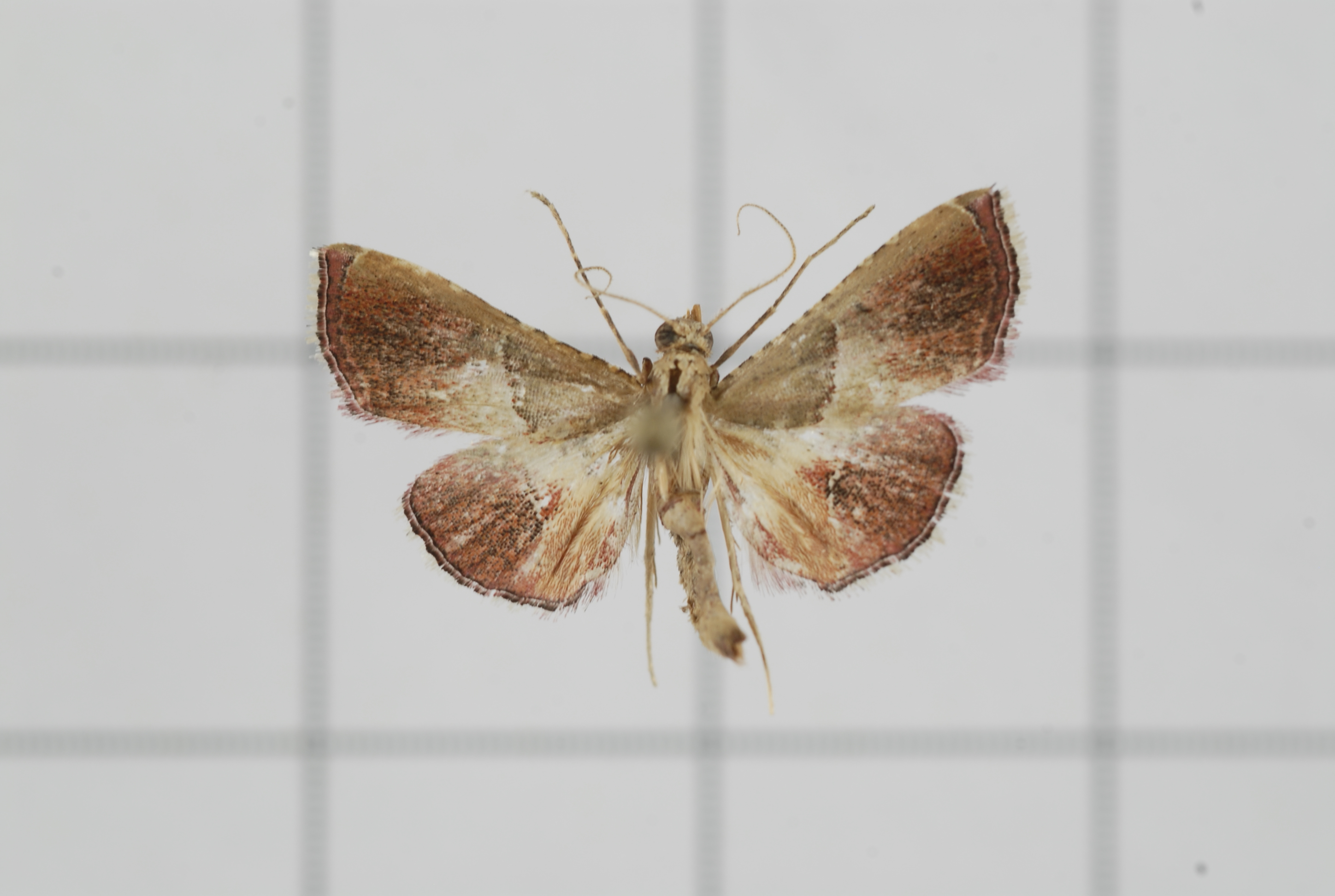

Scientific classification
- Kingdom: Animalia
- Phylum: Arthropoda
- Clade: Pancrustacea
- Class: Insecta
- Order: Lepidoptera
- Family: Pyralidae
- Genus: Endotricha
- Species: E. consocia

Binomial name
- Endotricha consocia (Butler, 1879)

Synonyms
- Doththa consocia Butler, 1879

= Endotricha consocia =

Species of moth

Endotricha consocia is a species of snout moth in the genus Endotricha. It was described by Arthur Gardiner Butler in 1879, and is known from Japan, Taiwan and China (Beijing, Fujian, Guangxi, Hebei, Henan, Hubei, Jiangsu, Jiangxi, Zhejiang).
