= Endotricha flavofascialis =

Scientific classification
- Kingdom: Animalia
- Phylum: Arthropoda
- Clade: Pancrustacea
- Class: Insecta
- Order: Lepidoptera
- Family: Pyralidae
- Genus: Endotricha
- Species: E. flavofascialis

Binomial name
- Endotricha flavofascialis (Bremer, 1864)

Synonyms
- Rhodaria flavofascialis Bremer, 1864; Endotricha affinialis South, 1901

Species of moth

Endotricha flavofascialis is a species of snout moth in the genus Endotricha. It is found in Russia and Japan.

== Subspecies ==
- Endotricha flavofascialis flavofascialis (south-eastern Siberia)
- Endotricha flavofascialis affinialis South, 1901 (Japan)
