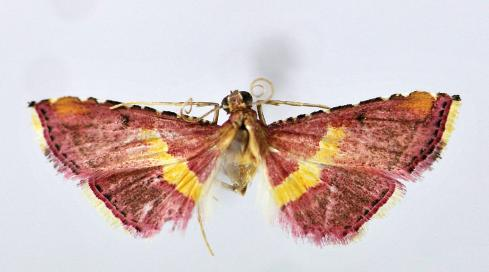
- Endotricha simipunicea

Scientific classification
- Kingdom: Animalia
- Phylum: Arthropoda
- Class: Insecta
- Order: Lepidoptera
- Family: Pyralidae
- Tribe: Endotrichini
- Genus: Endotricha; Zeller, 1847

Synonyms
- Doththa Walker, 1859; Endotrichodes Ragonot, 1891; Endotrichopsis Warren, 1895; Messatis Walker, 1859; Pacoria Walker, 1866; Paconia Walker, 1866; Rhisina Walker, 1866; Tricomia Walker, 1866; Zania Walker, 1866

= Endotricha =

Genus of moths

Endotricha is a genus of snout moths. It was described by Philipp Christoph Zeller in 1847.

== Species ==
- The flammealis species group
  - Endotricha consocia (Butler, 1879)
  - Endotricha flammealis (Denis & Schiffermüller, 1775)
  - Endotricha ragonoti Christoph, 1893
- The theonalis species group
  - Endotricha decessalis Walker, 1859
  - Endotricha theonalis (Walker, 1859)
- The occidentalis species group
  - Endotricha occidentalis Hampson, 1916
  - Endotricha hemicausta Turner, 1904
  - Endotricha melanchroa Turner, 1911
- The icelusalis species group
  - Endotricha kuznetzovi Whalley, 1963
  - Endotricha flavofascialis (Bremer, 1864)
  - Endotricha icelusalis (Walker, 1859)
  - Endotricha trichophoralis Hampson, 1906
- The luteogrisalis species group
  - Endotricha affinitalis (Hering, 1901)
  - Endotricha consobrinalis Zeller, 1852
  - Endotricha ellisoni Whalley, 1963
  - Endotricha loricata Moore, 1888
  - Endotricha lunulata Wang & Li, 2005
  - Endotricha luteogrisalis Hampson, 1896
  - Endotricha niveifimbrialis Hampson, 1906
  - Endotricha puncticostalis Walker, [1866] 1865
  - Endotricha punicea Whalley, 1963
  - Endotricha purpurata Wang & Li, 2005
  - Endotricha rogenhoferi Rebel, 1892
  - Endotricha rosina Ghesquière, 1942
  - Endotricha ruminalis (Walker, 1859)
  - Endotricha simipunicea Wang & Li, 2005
  - Endotricha vinolentalis Ragonot, 1891
  - Endotricha wilemani West, 1931
- The erythralis species group
  - Endotricha altitudinalis (Viette, 1957)
  - Endotricha erythralis Mabille, [1900]
  - Endotricha tamsi Whalley, 1963
  - Endotricha thomealis (Viette, 1957)
  - Endotricha viettealis Whalley, 1963
- The murecinalis species group
  - Endotricha gregalis Pagenstecher, 1900
  - Endotricha ignealis Guenée, 1854
  - Endotricha murecinalis Hampson, 1916
  - Endotricha portialis Walker, 1859
- The mesenterialis species group
  - Endotricha admirabilis V.A. Kirpichnikova, 2003
  - Endotricha argentata Whalley, 1963
  - Endotricha mesenterialis (Walker, 1859)
  - Endotricha olivacealis (Bremer, 1864)
  - Endotricha plinthopa Meyrick, 1886
  - Endotricha propinqua Whalley, 1963
  - Endotricha sexpunctata Whalley, 1963
  - Endotricha valentis V.A. Kirpichnikova, 2003
- The costaemaculalis species group
  - Endotricha ardentalis Hampson, 1896
  - Endotricha costaemaculalis Christoph, 1881
  - Endotricha dumalis Wang & Li, 2005
  - Endotricha eximia (Whalley, 1963)
  - Endotricha fuscobasalis Ragonot, 1891
  - Endotricha medogana Wang & Li, 2005
  - Endotricha minutiptera H.H. Li, 2009
  - Endotricha nigra Wang & Li, 2005
  - Endotricha similata (Moore, 1888)
  - Endotricha sondaicalis Snellen, 1880
  - Endotricha suavalis Snellen, 1895
- The nigromaculata species group
  - Endotricha borneoensis Hampson, 1916
  - Endotricha faceta Whalley, 1963
  - Endotricha fastigia Whalley, 1963
  - Endotricha hoenei Whalley, 1963
  - Endotricha melanobasis Hampson, 1916
  - Endotricha metacuralis Hampson, 1916
  - Endotricha nigromaculata Whalley, 1963
- The rhodomicta species group
  - Endotricha aureorufa Whalley, 1963
  - Endotricha euphiles Turner, 1932
  - Endotricha munroei Whalley, 1963
  - Endotricha persicopa Meyrick, 1889
  - Endotricha rhodomicta Hampson, 1916
- The flavifusalis species group
  - Endotricha flavifusalis Warren, 1891
  - Endotricha luteobasalis Caradja, 1935
  - Endotricha rufofimbrialis Warren, 1891
  - Endotricha sandaraca Whalley, 1963
  - Endotricha semirubrica Whalley, 1963
- The denticostalis species group
  - Endotricha albicilia Hampson, 1891
  - Endotricha capnospila Meyrick, 1932
  - Endotricha chionocosma Turner, 1904
  - Endotricha conchylaria Whalley, 1963
  - Endotricha cruenta Whalley, 1963
  - Endotricha denticostalis Hampson, 1906
  - Endotricha fuliginosa Whalley, 1963
- The simplex species group
  - Endotricha simplex Janse, 1924
  - Endotricha variabilis Janse, 1924
- The encaustalis species group
  - Endotricha approximalis Snellen, 1895
  - Endotricha dispergens Lucas, 1891
  - Endotricha encaustalis Hampson, 1916
  - Endotricha pyrosalis Guenée, 1854
- The psammitis species group
  - Endotricha nicobaralis Hampson, 1906
  - Endotricha psammitis Turner, 1904
- The coreacealis species group
  - Endotricha coreacealis Pagenstecher, 1884
  - Endotricha chionosema Hampson, 1916
  - Endotricha dyschroa Turner, 1918
  - Endotricha lobibasalis Hampson, 1906
  - Endotricha luteopuncta Whalley, 1963
  - Endotricha peterella Whalley, 1963
  - Endotricha pyrrhaema Hampson, 1916
- The pyrrhocosma species group
  - Endotricha bradleyi Whalley, 1962
  - Endotricha mariana Whalley, 1963
  - Endotricha pyrrhocosma Turner, 1911
  - Endotricha separata Whalley, 1963
  - Endotricha thermidora Hampson, 1916
- Unknown species group
  - Endotricha convexa Li, 2012
  - Endotricha dentiprocessa Li, 2012
  - Endotricha parki B.W. Lee & Y.S. Bae, 2007
  - Endotricha shafferi Li, 2012
  - Endotricha unicolor Li, 2012
  - Endotricha wammeralis Pagenstecher, 1886
  - Endotricha whalleyi Li, 2012
