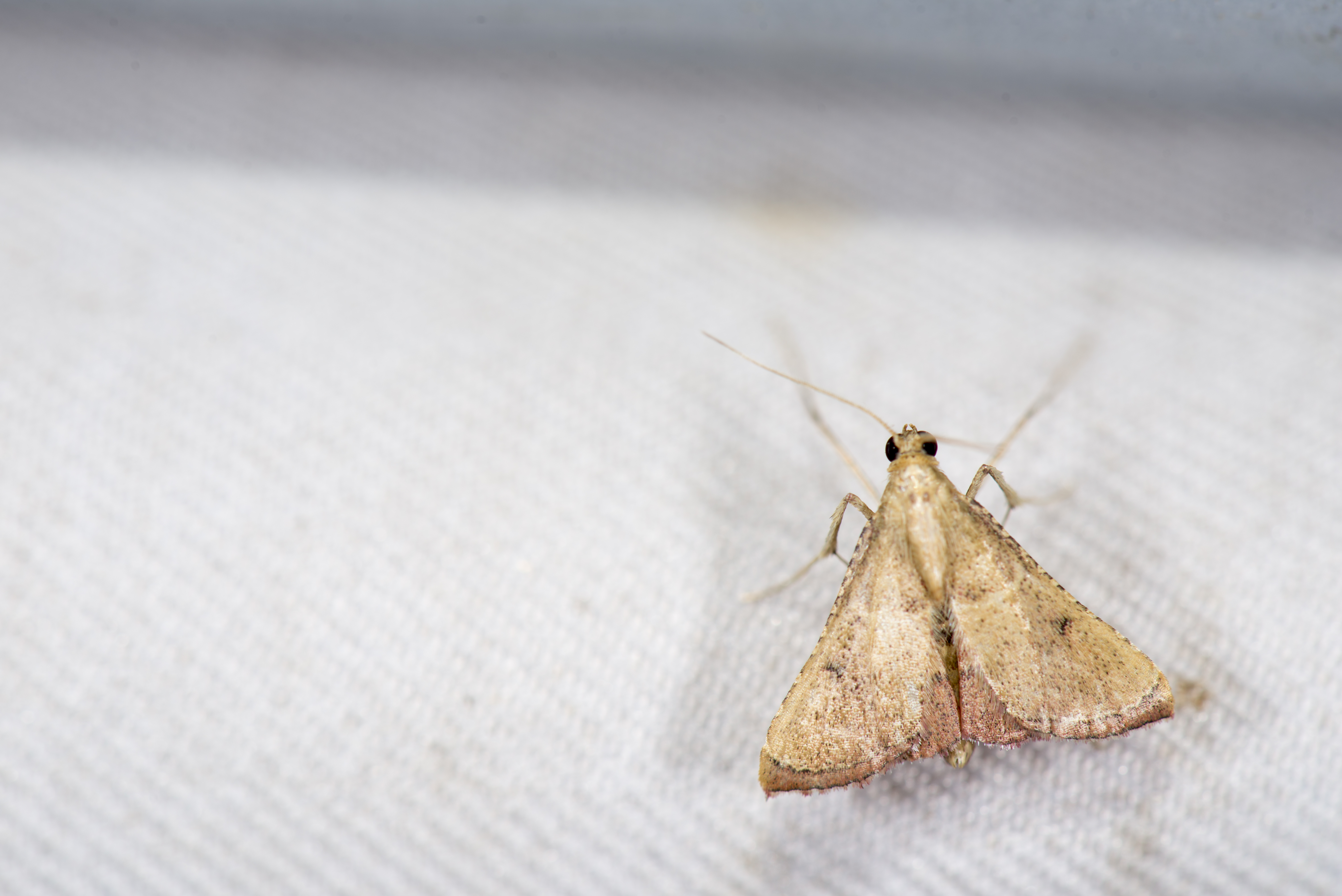

Scientific classification
- Kingdom: Animalia
- Phylum: Arthropoda
- Clade: Pancrustacea
- Class: Insecta
- Order: Lepidoptera
- Family: Pyralidae
- Genus: Endotricha
- Species: E. nicobaralis

Binomial name
- Endotricha nicobaralis Hampson, 1906

= Endotricha nicobaralis =

Species of moth

Endotricha nicobaralis is a species of snout moth in the genus Endotricha. It is found in the Nicobar Islands, Burma and China (Hainan).
