= Endotricha gregalis =

Scientific classification
- Kingdom: Animalia
- Phylum: Arthropoda
- Clade: Pancrustacea
- Class: Insecta
- Order: Lepidoptera
- Family: Pyralidae
- Genus: Endotricha
- Species: E. gregalis

Binomial name
- Endotricha gregalis Pagenstecher, 1900

Species of moth

Endotricha gregalis is a species of snout moth in the genus Endotricha. It was described by Arnold Pagenstecher in 1900, and is known from New Britain.
