= Endotricha ellisoni =

Scientific classification
- Kingdom: Animalia
- Phylum: Arthropoda
- Clade: Pancrustacea
- Class: Insecta
- Order: Lepidoptera
- Family: Pyralidae
- Genus: Endotricha
- Species: E. ellisoni

Binomial name
- Endotricha ellisoni Whalley, 1963

Species of moth

Endotricha ellisoni is a species of snout moth in the genus Endotricha. It was described by Paul Ernest Sutton Whalley in 1963, and is known from Ethiopia, Uganda, Kenya, Congo, and South Africa.
