= Endotricha plinthopa =

Scientific classification
- Kingdom: Animalia
- Phylum: Arthropoda
- Clade: Pancrustacea
- Class: Insecta
- Order: Lepidoptera
- Family: Pyralidae
- Genus: Endotricha
- Species: E. plinthopa

Binomial name
- Endotricha plinthopa Meyrick, 1886

Species of moth

Endotricha plinthopa is a species of snout moth in the genus Endotricha. It was described by Edward Meyrick in 1886, and is known from Samoa.
