= Endotricha ardentalis =

Scientific classification
- Kingdom: Animalia
- Phylum: Arthropoda
- Clade: Pancrustacea
- Class: Insecta
- Order: Lepidoptera
- Family: Pyralidae
- Genus: Endotricha
- Species: E. ardentalis

Binomial name
- Endotricha ardentalis Hampson, 1896

Species of moth

Endotricha ardentalis is a species of snout moth in the genus Endotricha. It was described by George Hampson in 1896 and is known from northern India.
