= Endotricha niveifimbrialis =

Scientific classification
- Kingdom: Animalia
- Phylum: Arthropoda
- Clade: Pancrustacea
- Class: Insecta
- Order: Lepidoptera
- Family: Pyralidae
- Genus: Endotricha
- Species: E. niveifimbrialis

Binomial name
- Endotricha niveifimbrialis Hampson, 1906

Species of moth

Endotricha niveifimbrialis is a species of snout moth in the genus Endotricha. It was described by George Hampson in 1906, and is known from Sierra Leone.
