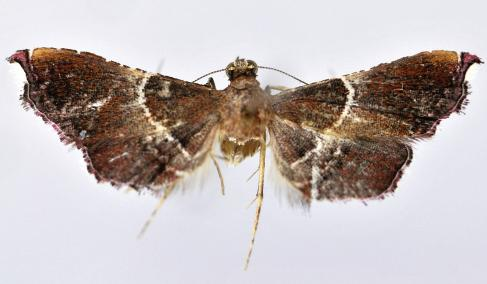

Scientific classification
- Kingdom: Animalia
- Phylum: Arthropoda
- Clade: Pancrustacea
- Class: Insecta
- Order: Lepidoptera
- Family: Pyralidae
- Genus: Endotricha
- Species: E. dentiprocessa

Binomial name
- Endotricha dentiprocessa Li, 2012

= Endotricha dentiprocessa =

Species of moth

Endotricha dentiprocessa is a species of snout moth in the genus Endotricha. It is found in China (Guangxi).

The wingspan is 17−18.5 mm. The forewings are blackish brown, covered with dense reddish brown scales. The hindwings are concolorous to the forewings, but yellowish white on the costal margin.

== Etymology ==
The specific epithet is from the Latin prefix dent- (meaning dentate) and processus (meaning process) and refers to the valva with narrow sclerotized plate bearing large teeth ventrobasally.
