= Endotricha wilemani =

Scientific classification
- Kingdom: Animalia
- Phylum: Arthropoda
- Clade: Pancrustacea
- Class: Insecta
- Order: Lepidoptera
- Family: Pyralidae
- Genus: Endotricha
- Species: E. wilemani

Binomial name
- Endotricha wilemani West, 1931

Species of moth

Endotricha wilemani is a species of snout moth in the genus Endotricha. It was described by Reginald James West in 1931, and is known from the Philippines.
