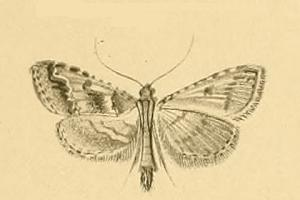
- Male
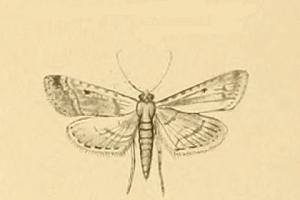
- Female

Scientific classification
- Kingdom: Animalia
- Phylum: Arthropoda
- Clade: Pancrustacea
- Class: Insecta
- Order: Lepidoptera
- Family: Pyralidae
- Genus: Endotricha
- Species: E. rogenhoferi

Binomial name
- Endotricha rogenhoferi Rebel, 1892

= Endotricha rogenhoferi =

Species of moth

Endotricha rogenhoferi is a species of snout moth in the genus Endotricha. It was described by Hans Rebel in 1892, and is known from the Canary Islands.
