= Endotricha portialis =

Scientific classification
- Kingdom: Animalia
- Phylum: Arthropoda
- Clade: Pancrustacea
- Class: Insecta
- Order: Lepidoptera
- Family: Pyralidae
- Genus: Endotricha
- Species: E. portialis

Binomial name
- Endotricha portialis Walker, 1859

Synonyms
- Doththa aecusalis Walker, 1859; Endotrichopsis rhodopteralis Warren, 1895; Endotricha acrobasalis Snellen, 1892

Species of moth

Endotricha portialis is a species of snout moth in the genus Endotricha. It was described by Francis Walker in 1859, and is known from Borneo, Java, Japan, Sumatra, Taiwan and China (Fujian, Guangdong, Guangxi, Guizhou, Hebei, Hubei, Hunan, Jiangxi, Ningxia, Shaanxi, Shandong).
