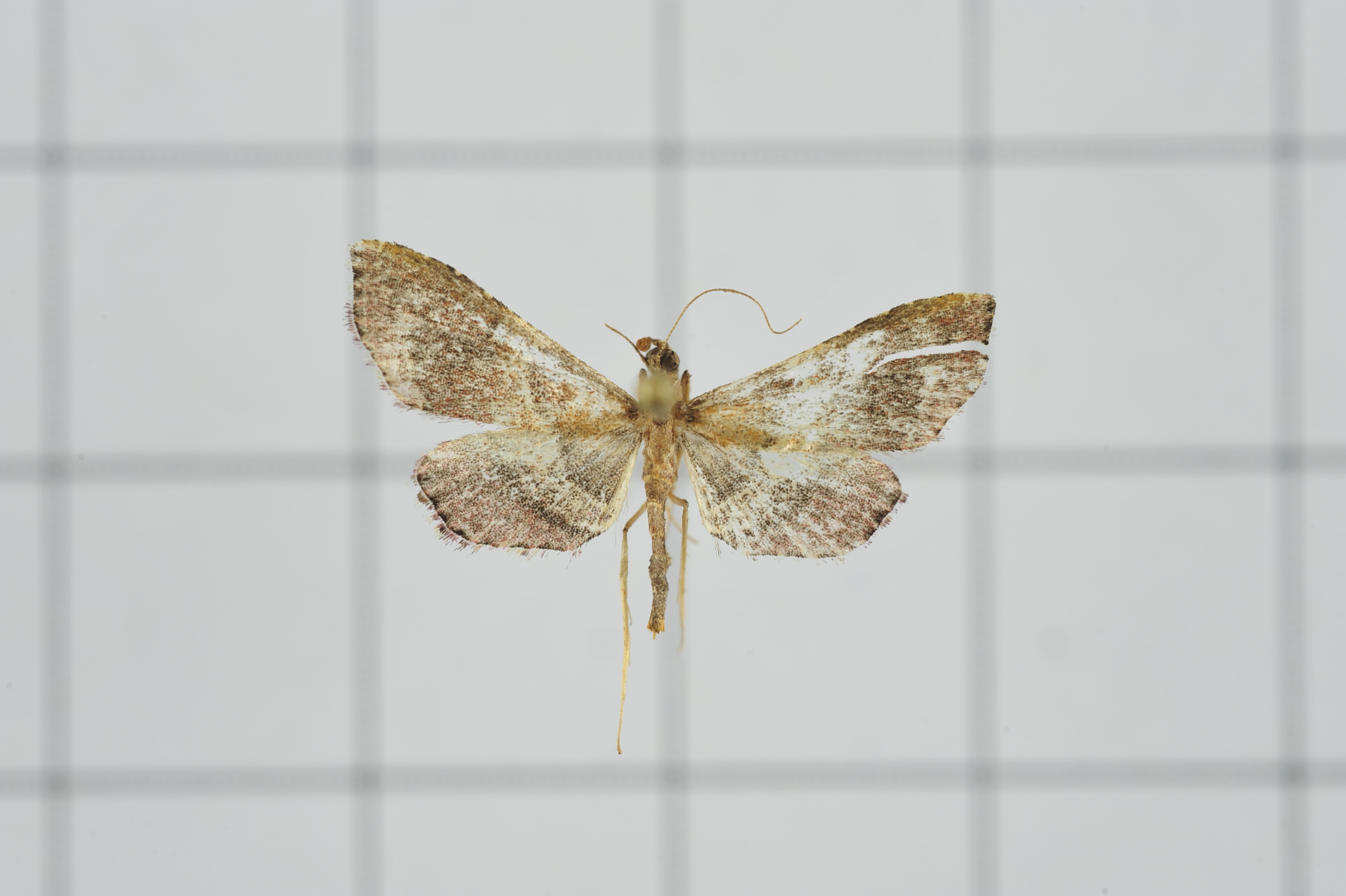

Scientific classification
- Kingdom: Animalia
- Phylum: Arthropoda
- Clade: Pancrustacea
- Class: Insecta
- Order: Lepidoptera
- Family: Pyralidae
- Genus: Endotricha
- Species: E. similata

Binomial name
- Endotricha similata (Moore, 1888)

Synonyms
- Doththa similata Moore, 1888

= Endotricha similata =

Species of moth

Endotricha similata is a species of snout moth in the genus Endotricha. It is found in Burma, Taiwan, India and Sri Lanka and China (Hubei, Sichuan).
