= Endotricha simplex =

Scientific classification
- Kingdom: Animalia
- Phylum: Arthropoda
- Clade: Pancrustacea
- Class: Insecta
- Order: Lepidoptera
- Family: Pyralidae
- Genus: Endotricha
- Species: E. simplex

Binomial name
- Endotricha simplex Janse, 1924

Species of moth

Endotricha simplex is a species of snout moth in the genus Endotricha. It was described by Anthonie Johannes Theodorus Janse in 1924, and is known from the Moluccas and the Louisiade Archipelago.

== Subspecies ==
- Endotricha simplex simplex (Moluccas)
- Endotricha simplex rosselli Whalley, 1963 (Louisiade Archipelago)
