= Endotricha variabilis =

Scientific classification
- Kingdom: Animalia
- Phylum: Arthropoda
- Clade: Pancrustacea
- Class: Insecta
- Order: Lepidoptera
- Family: Pyralidae
- Genus: Endotricha
- Species: E. variabilis

Binomial name
- Endotricha variabilis Janse, 1924

Species of moth

Endotricha variabilis is a species of snout moth in the genus Endotricha. It was described by Anthonie Johannes Theodorus Janse in 1924, and is known from the Moluccas.
