= Endotricha wammeralis =

Scientific classification
- Kingdom: Animalia
- Phylum: Arthropoda
- Clade: Pancrustacea
- Class: Insecta
- Order: Lepidoptera
- Family: Pyralidae
- Genus: Endotricha
- Species: E. wammeralis

Binomial name
- Endotricha wammeralis Pagenstecher, 1886

Species of moth

Endotricha wammeralis is a species of snout moth in the genus Endotricha. It was described by Arnold Pagenstecher in 1886, and is known from Aru.
