= Endotricha erythralis =

Scientific classification
- Kingdom: Animalia
- Phylum: Arthropoda
- Clade: Pancrustacea
- Class: Insecta
- Order: Lepidoptera
- Family: Pyralidae
- Genus: Endotricha
- Species: E. erythralis

Binomial name
- Endotricha erythralis Mabille, 1900

Synonyms
- Endotricha rosellita Ghesquière, 1942

Species of moth

Endotricha erythralis is a species of snout moth in the genus Endotricha. It was described by Paul Mabille in 1900, and is known from Madagascar, South Africa, the Democratic Republic of the Congo and Socotra.
