= Endotricha denticostalis =

Scientific classification
- Kingdom: Animalia
- Phylum: Arthropoda
- Clade: Pancrustacea
- Class: Insecta
- Order: Lepidoptera
- Family: Pyralidae
- Genus: Endotricha
- Species: E. denticostalis

Binomial name
- Endotricha denticostalis Hampson, 1906

Species of moth

Endotricha denticostalis is a species of snout moth in the genus Endotricha. It was described by George Hampson, in 1906, and is known from Borneo.
