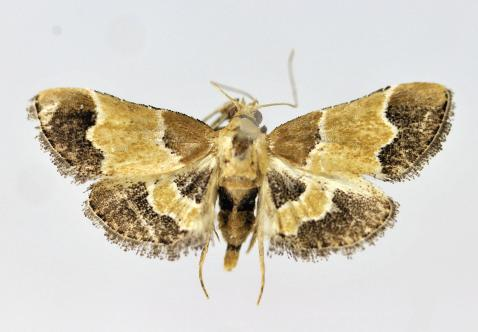

Scientific classification
- Kingdom: Animalia
- Phylum: Arthropoda
- Clade: Pancrustacea
- Class: Insecta
- Order: Lepidoptera
- Family: Pyralidae
- Genus: Endotricha
- Species: E. luteogrisalis

Binomial name
- Endotricha luteogrisalis Hampson, 1896

= Endotricha luteogrisalis =

Species of moth

Endotricha luteogrisalis is a species of snout moth in the genus Endotricha. It was described by George Hampson in 1896, and is known from northern India, Bhutan and China (Fujian, Hainan, Jiangxi, Yunnan).

The wingspan is 16.5−20 mm.
