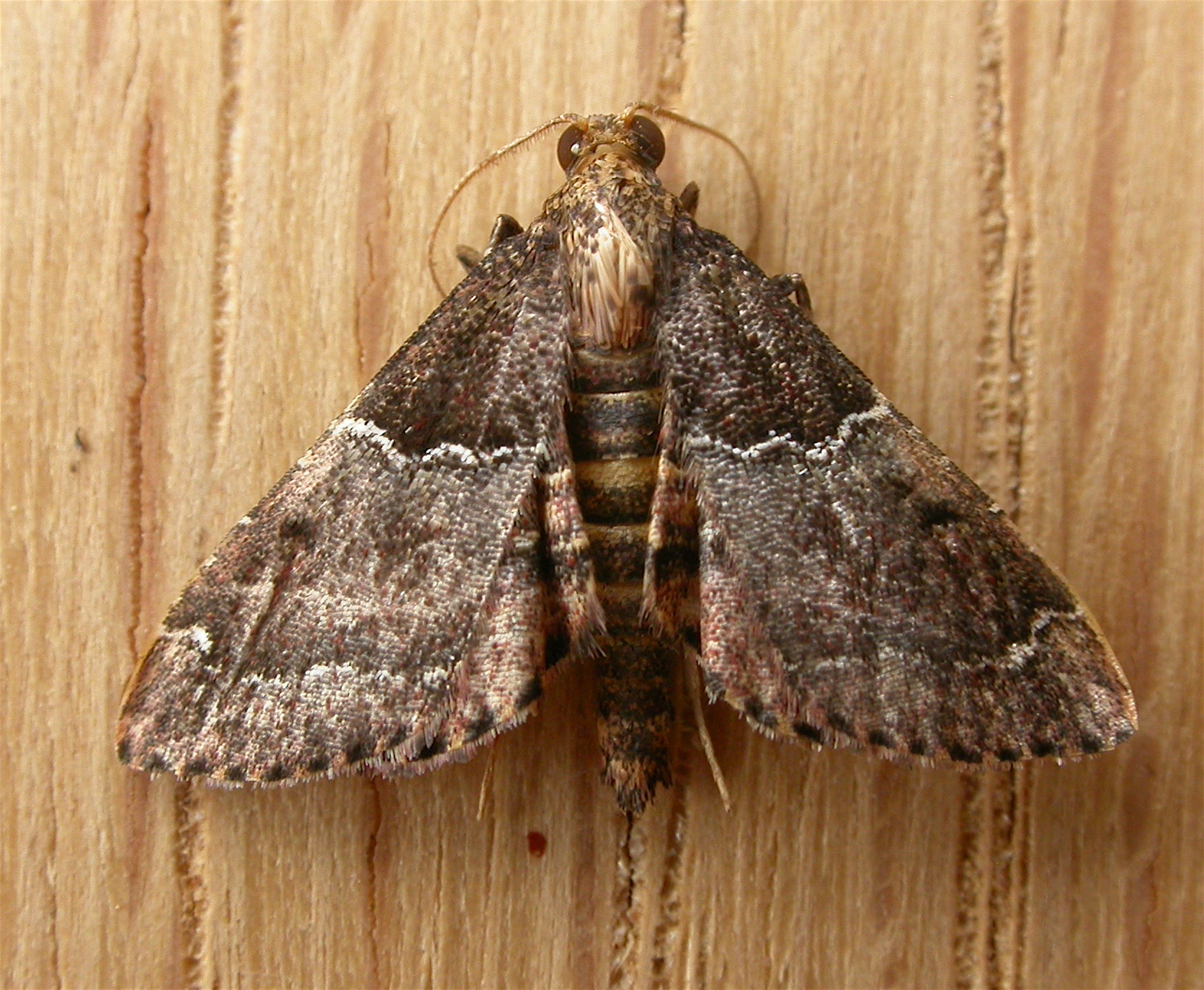

Scientific classification
- Kingdom: Animalia
- Phylum: Arthropoda
- Clade: Pancrustacea
- Class: Insecta
- Order: Lepidoptera
- Family: Pyralidae
- Genus: Persicoptera
- Species: P. compsopa

Binomial name
- Persicoptera compsopa Meyrick, 1887

= Persicoptera compsopa =

Species of moth

Persicoptera compsopa is a moth of the family Pyralidae described by Edward Meyrick in 1887. It is found in Australia.
