= Endotricha rufofimbrialis =

Scientific classification
- Kingdom: Animalia
- Phylum: Arthropoda
- Clade: Pancrustacea
- Class: Insecta
- Order: Lepidoptera
- Family: Pyralidae
- Genus: Endotricha
- Species: E. rufofimbrialis

Binomial name
- Endotricha rufofimbrialis Warren, 1891

Species of moth

Endotricha rufofimbrialis is a species of snout moth in the genus Endotricha. It was described by William Warren in 1891, and is known from Borneo and northern India.
