= Endotricha ragonoti =

Scientific classification
- Kingdom: Animalia
- Phylum: Arthropoda
- Clade: Pancrustacea
- Class: Insecta
- Order: Lepidoptera
- Family: Pyralidae
- Genus: Endotricha
- Species: E. ragonoti

Binomial name
- Endotricha ragonoti Christoph, 1893

Synonyms
- Endotricha albicinctalis Hampson, 1903

Species of moth

Endotricha ragonoti is a species of snout moth in the genus Endotricha. It was described by Hugo Theodor Christoph, in 1893. It is found from the Tian Shan mountains to northern India and China (Xinjiang).

The wingspan is 18–18.5 mm.
