= Endotricha suavalis =

Scientific classification
- Kingdom: Animalia
- Phylum: Arthropoda
- Clade: Pancrustacea
- Class: Insecta
- Order: Lepidoptera
- Family: Pyralidae
- Genus: Endotricha
- Species: E. suavalis

Binomial name
- Endotricha suavalis Snellen, 1895

Species of moth

Endotricha suavalis is a species of snout moth in the genus Endotricha. It was described by Pieter Cornelius Tobias Snellen in 1895, and is known from Java, Indonesia.
