= Endotricha fuscobasalis =

Scientific classification
- Kingdom: Animalia
- Phylum: Arthropoda
- Clade: Pancrustacea
- Class: Insecta
- Order: Lepidoptera
- Family: Pyralidae
- Genus: Endotricha
- Species: E. fuscobasalis

Binomial name
- Endotricha fuscobasalis Ragonot, 1891

Species of moth

Endotricha fuscobasalis is a species of snout moth in the genus Endotricha. It is found in China (Tibet) and India.
