= Endotricha flavifusalis =

Scientific classification
- Kingdom: Animalia
- Phylum: Arthropoda
- Clade: Pancrustacea
- Class: Insecta
- Order: Lepidoptera
- Family: Pyralidae
- Genus: Endotricha
- Species: E. flavifusalis

Binomial name
- Endotricha flavifusalis Warren, 1891

Species of moth

Endotricha flavifusalis is a species of snout moth in the genus Endotricha. It is found in China (Hainan), Indonesia, Malaysia and Papua New Guinea.
