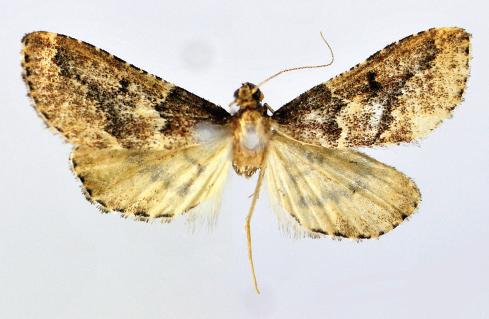
- Male
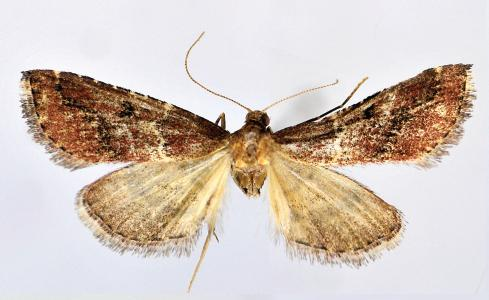
- Female

Scientific classification
- Kingdom: Animalia
- Phylum: Arthropoda
- Clade: Pancrustacea
- Class: Insecta
- Order: Lepidoptera
- Family: Pyralidae
- Genus: Endotricha
- Species: E. unicolor

Binomial name
- Endotricha unicolor Li, 2012

= Endotricha unicolor =

Species of moth

Endotricha unicolor is a species of snout moth in the genus Endotricha. It is found in China (Tibet).

The wingspan is about 20 mm. The forewings are brown, irrorated with purple reddish brown scales throughout in females and from the base to the antemedian line in males. The hindwings are yellowish grey, tinged with black distally.

== Etymology ==
This specific name is from the Latin prefix uni- (meaning unitary) and the Latin postfix -color (meaning color) and refers to the hindwing without distinct patterns.
