= Endotricha costaemaculalis =

Scientific classification
- Kingdom: Animalia
- Phylum: Arthropoda
- Clade: Pancrustacea
- Class: Insecta
- Order: Lepidoptera
- Family: Pyralidae
- Genus: Endotricha
- Species: E. costaemaculalis

Binomial name
- Endotricha costaemaculalis Christoph, 1881

Synonyms
- Endotricha formosensis Hampson, 1916; Endotricha fuscifusalis Hampson, 1896

Species of moth

Endotricha costaemaculalis is a species of snout moth in the genus Endotricha. It was described by Hugo Theodor Christoph in 1881, and is known from China, Korea, Japan, Taiwan, India and Russia.

== Subspecies ==
- Endotricha costaemaculalis costaemaculalis (south-eastern Siberia, Korea, Japan, China: Guangdong, Hebei, Henan, Hubei, Zhejiang)
- Endotricha costaemaculalis formosensis Hampson, 1916 (Taiwan)
- Endotricha costaemaculalis fuscifusalis Hampson, 1896 (northern India, southern Tibet, southern China)
