= Endotricha capnospila =

Scientific classification
- Kingdom: Animalia
- Phylum: Arthropoda
- Clade: Pancrustacea
- Class: Insecta
- Order: Lepidoptera
- Family: Pyralidae
- Genus: Endotricha
- Species: E. capnospila

Binomial name
- Endotricha capnospila Meyrick, 1932

Species of moth

Endotricha capnospila is a species of snout moth in the genus Endotricha. It was described by Edward Meyrick in 1932, and is known from Fiji.
