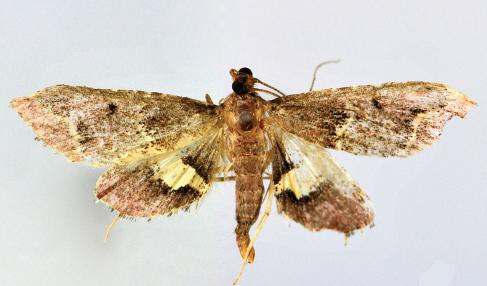

Scientific classification
- Kingdom: Animalia
- Phylum: Arthropoda
- Clade: Pancrustacea
- Class: Insecta
- Order: Lepidoptera
- Family: Pyralidae
- Genus: Endotricha
- Species: E. whalleyi

Binomial name
- Endotricha whalleyi Li, 2012

= Endotricha whalleyi =

Species of moth

Endotricha whalleyi is a species of snout moth in the genus Endotricha. It is found in China (Tibet).
