= Endotricha admirabilis =

Scientific classification
- Kingdom: Animalia
- Phylum: Arthropoda
- Clade: Pancrustacea
- Class: Insecta
- Order: Lepidoptera
- Family: Pyralidae
- Genus: Endotricha
- Species: E. admirabilis

Binomial name
- Endotricha admirabilis Kirpichnikova, 2003

Species of moth

Endotricha admirabilis is a species of snout moth in the genus Endotricha. It was described by Valentina A. Kirpichnikova in 2003, and is known from China (Henan) and the Russian Far East.

The wingspan is 17–18 millimetres (0.67–0.71 in).
