= Endotricha icelusalis =

Scientific classification
- Kingdom: Animalia
- Phylum: Arthropoda
- Clade: Pancrustacea
- Class: Insecta
- Order: Lepidoptera
- Family: Pyralidae
- Genus: Endotricha
- Species: E. icelusalis

Binomial name
- Endotricha icelusalis (Walker, 1859)

Synonyms
- Pyralis icelusalis Walker, 1859; Pyralis rosealis Walker, [1866]

Species of moth

Endotricha icelusalis is a species of snout moth in the genus Endotricha. It was described by Francis Walker in 1859, and is known from China (Fujian, Gansu, Guangdong, Guangxi, Hubei, Hunan, Jiangsu, Jiangxi, Sichuan, Yunnan, Zhejiang) and Japan.
