= Endotricha sandaraca =

Scientific classification
- Kingdom: Animalia
- Phylum: Arthropoda
- Clade: Pancrustacea
- Class: Insecta
- Order: Lepidoptera
- Family: Pyralidae
- Genus: Endotricha
- Species: E. sandaraca

Binomial name
- Endotricha sandaraca Whalley, 1963

Species of moth

Endotricha sandaraca is a species of snout moth in the genus Endotricha. It was described by Paul E. S. Whalley in 1963, and is known from Borneo.
