= Endotricha altitudinalis =

Scientific classification
- Kingdom: Animalia
- Phylum: Arthropoda
- Clade: Pancrustacea
- Class: Insecta
- Order: Lepidoptera
- Family: Pyralidae
- Genus: Endotricha
- Species: E. altitudinalis

Binomial name
- Endotricha altitudinalis (Viette, 1957)

Synonyms
- Anobostra altitudinalis Viette, 1957

Species of moth

Endotricha altitudinalis is a species of snout moth in the genus Endotricha. It was described by Viette in 1957, and is known from São Tomé & Principe.
