= Endotricha persicopa =

Scientific classification
- Kingdom: Animalia
- Phylum: Arthropoda
- Clade: Pancrustacea
- Class: Insecta
- Order: Lepidoptera
- Family: Pyralidae
- Genus: Endotricha
- Species: E. persicopa

Binomial name
- Endotricha persicopa Meyrick, 1889

Synonyms
- Endotricha buralis Holland, 1900; Endotricha paliolata Hampson, 1916

Species of moth

Endotricha persicopa is a species of snout moth in the genus Endotricha. It was described by Edward Meyrick in 1889.

== Subspecies ==
- Endotricha persicopa persicopa (New Guinea, New Ireland, Goodenough Island, Buru)
- Endotricha persicopa paliolata Hampson, 1916 (St. Aignans, Rossell Island, Sudest Island)
