= Endotricha puncticostalis =

Scientific classification
- Kingdom: Animalia
- Phylum: Arthropoda
- Clade: Pancrustacea
- Class: Insecta
- Order: Lepidoptera
- Family: Pyralidae
- Genus: Endotricha
- Species: E. puncticostalis

Binomial name
- Endotricha puncticostalis (Walker, [1866])

Synonyms
- Rhisina puncticostalis Walker, [1866]; Endotricha ustalis Snellen, 1880; Pyralis listeri Butler, 1888

Species of moth

Endotricha puncticostalis is a species of snout moth in the genus Endotricha. It was described by Francis Walker in 1866, and is known from Australia, the Selayar Islands, Christmas Island, the Philippines, Sumba, Java, and Sulawesi.
