= Endotricha loricata =

Scientific classification
- Kingdom: Animalia
- Phylum: Arthropoda
- Clade: Pancrustacea
- Class: Insecta
- Order: Lepidoptera
- Family: Pyralidae
- Genus: Endotricha
- Species: E. loricata

Binomial name
- Endotricha loricata (Moore, 1888)

Synonyms
- Endotriche loricata Moore, 1888; Pyralis ustalis Hampson, 1893

Species of moth

Endotricha loricata is a species of snout moth in the genus Endotricha. It was described by Frederic Moore, in 1888. It is found in Sri Lanka, Pakistan, India and China (Yunnan).

The wingspan is 16 mm.
