= Endotricha rosina =

Scientific classification
- Kingdom: Animalia
- Phylum: Arthropoda
- Clade: Pancrustacea
- Class: Insecta
- Order: Lepidoptera
- Family: Pyralidae
- Genus: Endotricha
- Species: E. rosina

Binomial name
- Endotricha rosina Ghesquière, 1942

Species of moth

Endotricha rosina is a species of snout moth in the genus Endotricha. It was described by Jean Ghesquière in 1942, and is known from the Democratic Republic of the Congo.
