= Endotricha hemicausta =

Scientific classification
- Kingdom: Animalia
- Phylum: Arthropoda
- Clade: Pancrustacea
- Class: Insecta
- Order: Lepidoptera
- Family: Pyralidae
- Genus: Endotricha
- Species: E. hemicausta

Binomial name
- Endotricha hemicausta Turner, 1904

Species of moth

Endotricha hemicausta is a species of snout moth in the genus Endotricha. It is found in northern Australia.
