= Oenogenes congrualis =

Scientific classification
- Kingdom: Animalia
- Phylum: Arthropoda
- Clade: Pancrustacea
- Class: Insecta
- Order: Lepidoptera
- Family: Pyralidae
- Genus: Oenogenes
- Species: O. congrualis

Binomial name
- Oenogenes congrualis (Walker, [1866])

Synonyms
- Pacoria congrualis Walker, [1866]

Species of moth

Oenogenes congrualis is a species of snout moth in the genus Oenogenes. It is found in Australia. It was described by Francis Walker in 1866.
