= Endotricha nigromaculata =

Scientific classification
- Kingdom: Animalia
- Phylum: Arthropoda
- Clade: Pancrustacea
- Class: Insecta
- Order: Lepidoptera
- Family: Pyralidae
- Genus: Endotricha
- Species: E. nigromaculata

Binomial name
- Endotricha nigromaculata Whalley, 1963

Species of moth

Endotricha nigromaculata is a species of snout moth in the genus Endotricha with the generic name of "Endotricha". It was described by Paul E. S. Whalley in 1963, and is known from India.
