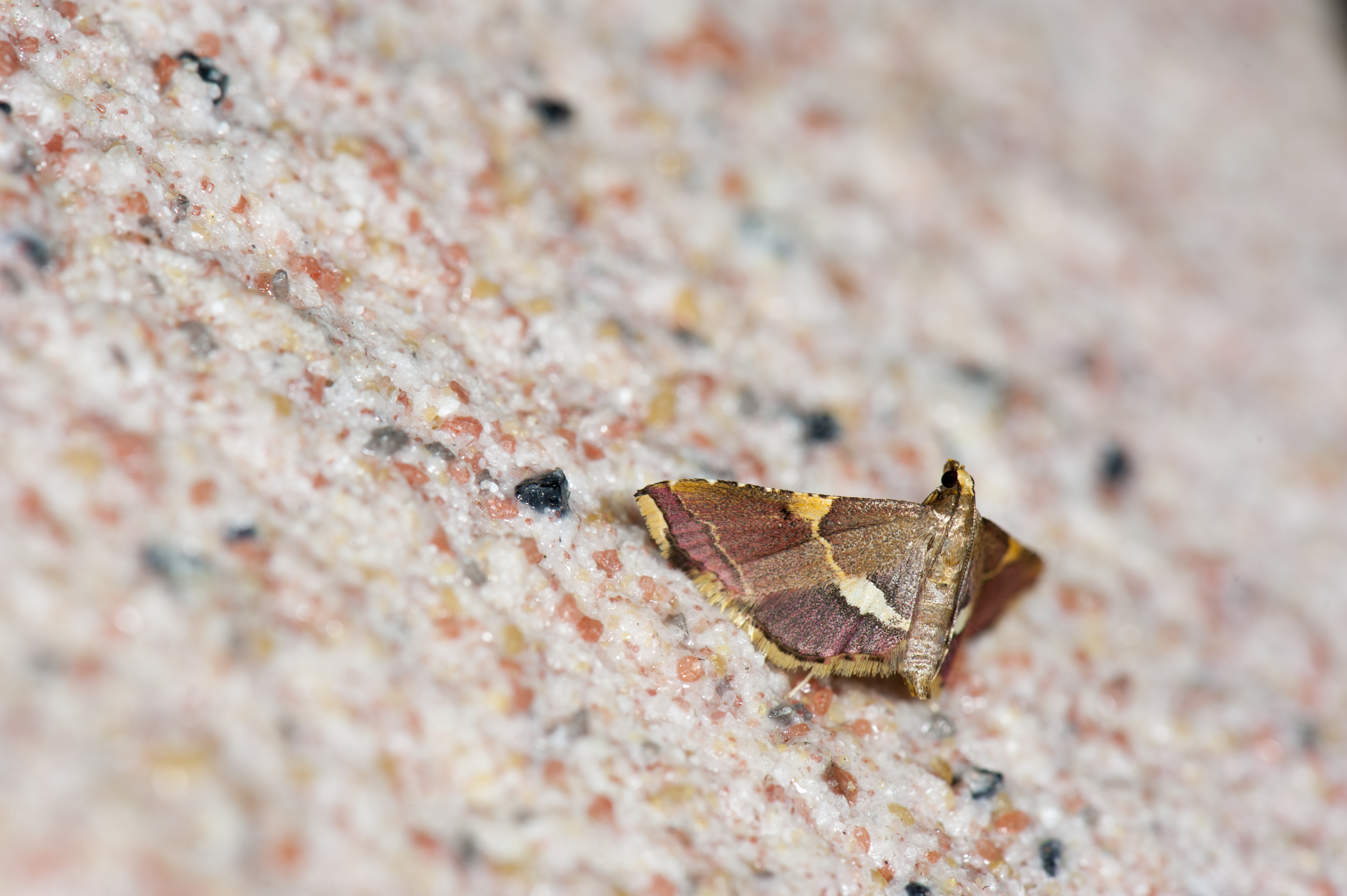

Scientific classification
- Kingdom: Animalia
- Phylum: Arthropoda
- Clade: Pancrustacea
- Class: Insecta
- Order: Lepidoptera
- Family: Pyralidae
- Genus: Endotricha
- Species: E. metacuralis

Binomial name
- Endotricha metacuralis Hampson, 1916

= Endotricha metacuralis =

Species of moth

Endotricha metacuralis is a species of snout moth in the genus Endotricha. It is found in Taiwan and China (Guizhou).
