= Endotricha decessalis =

Scientific classification
- Kingdom: Animalia
- Phylum: Arthropoda
- Clade: Pancrustacea
- Class: Insecta
- Order: Lepidoptera
- Family: Pyralidae
- Genus: Endotricha
- Species: E. decessalis

Binomial name
- Endotricha decessalis Walker, 1859

Species of moth

Endotricha decessalis is a species of snout moth in the genus Endotricha. It was described by Francis Walker in 1859, and is known from Sri Lanka, China (Fujian), Burma, the Seychelles, Sarawak and the Andaman Islands.

== Subspecies ==
- Endotricha decessalis decessalis (Sri Lanka, China (Fujian), Burma, the Seychelles)
- Endotricha decessalis major Whalley, 1963 (Sarawak, Andaman Islands)
