= Endotricha pyrrhocosma =

Scientific classification
- Kingdom: Animalia
- Phylum: Arthropoda
- Clade: Pancrustacea
- Class: Insecta
- Order: Lepidoptera
- Family: Pyralidae
- Genus: Endotricha
- Species: E. pyrrhocosma

Binomial name
- Endotricha pyrrhocosma Turner, 1911

Species of moth

Endotricha pyrrhocosma is a species of snout moth in the genus Endotricha. It was described by Alfred Jefferis Turner in 1911, and is known from Australia, Manovolka Island, and Woodlark Island.
