= Endotricha lobibasalis =

Scientific classification
- Kingdom: Animalia
- Phylum: Arthropoda
- Clade: Pancrustacea
- Class: Insecta
- Order: Lepidoptera
- Family: Pyralidae
- Genus: Endotricha
- Species: E. lobibasalis

Binomial name
- Endotricha lobibasalis Hampson, 1906

Species of moth

Endotricha lobibasalis is a species of snout moth in the genus Endotricha. It is found in Australia, the Dampier Archipelago, New Guinea, China (Hainan) and Indonesia.
