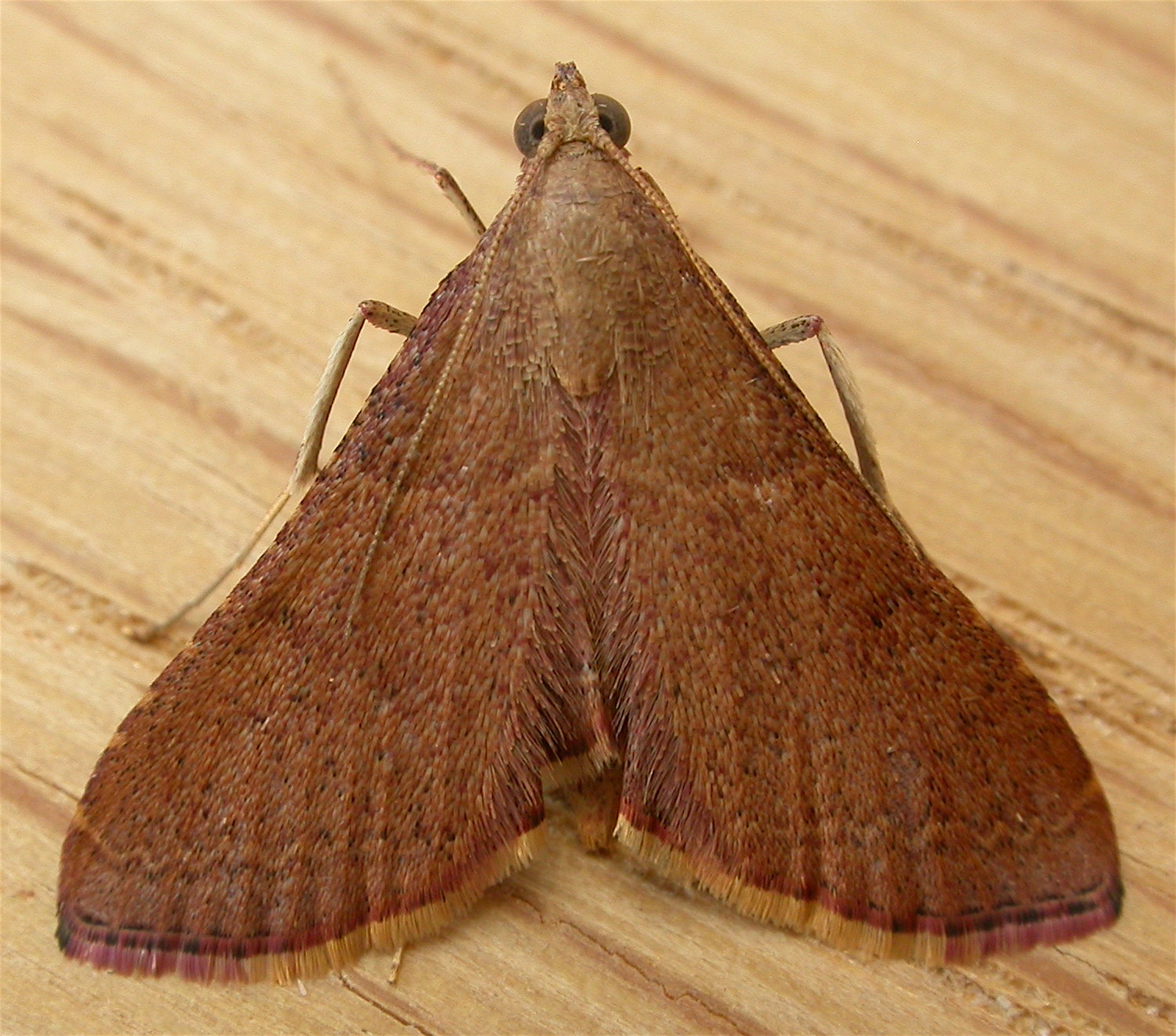

Scientific classification
- Kingdom: Animalia
- Phylum: Arthropoda
- Clade: Pancrustacea
- Class: Insecta
- Order: Lepidoptera
- Family: Pyralidae
- Genus: Endotricha
- Species: E. ignealis

Binomial name
- Endotricha ignealis Guenée, 1854

Synonyms
- Pyralis docilisalis Walker, 1859; Endotricha aethopa Meyrick, 1884

= Endotricha ignealis =

Species of moth

Endotricha ignealis is a moth of the family Pyralidae. It was described by Achille Guenée in 1854 and is found in Australia.
