= Oenogenes =

Scientific classification
- Kingdom: Animalia
- Phylum: Arthropoda
- Clade: Pancrustacea
- Class: Insecta
- Order: Lepidoptera
- Family: Pyralidae
- Tribe: Endotrichini
- Genus: Oenogenes; Meyrick, 1884

Genus of moths

Oenogenes is a genus of snout moths. It was described by Edward Meyrick in 1884.

== Species ==
- Oenogenes congrualis (Walker, [1866])
- Oenogenes fugalis (C. Felder, R. Felder & Rogenhofer, 1875)
