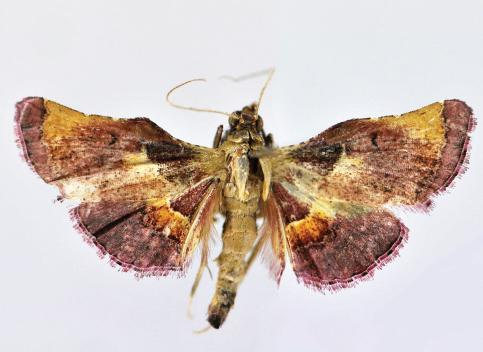
- Male
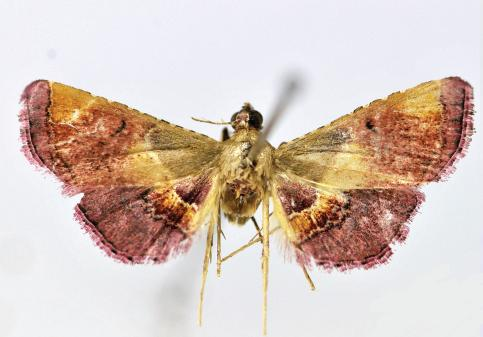
- Female

Scientific classification
- Kingdom: Animalia
- Phylum: Arthropoda
- Clade: Pancrustacea
- Class: Insecta
- Order: Lepidoptera
- Family: Pyralidae
- Genus: Endotricha
- Species: E. convexa

Binomial name
- Endotricha convexa Li, 2012

= Endotricha convexa =

Species of moth

Endotricha convexa is a species of snout moth in the genus Endotricha. It is found in China (Hainan).

The wingspan is 20–22 millimetres (0.79–0.87 in). The forewings are purplish red in males. The hindwings are concolorous to the forewings except for a whitish yellow area anteriorly.

== Etymology ==
The specific epithet is derived from the Latin convexus (meaning convex) and refers to the forewing hump.
