= Endotricha chionosema =

Scientific classification
- Kingdom: Animalia
- Phylum: Arthropoda
- Clade: Pancrustacea
- Class: Insecta
- Order: Lepidoptera
- Family: Pyralidae
- Genus: Endotricha
- Species: E. chionosema

Binomial name
- Endotricha chionosema Hampson, 1916

Species of moth

Endotricha chionosema is a species of snout moth in the genus Endotricha. It was described by George Hampson in 1916, and is known from Goodenough Island and the Dampier Archipelago.
