= Endotricha consobrinalis =

Scientific classification
- Kingdom: Animalia
- Phylum: Arthropoda
- Clade: Pancrustacea
- Class: Insecta
- Order: Lepidoptera
- Family: Pyralidae
- Genus: Endotricha
- Species: E. consobrinalis

Binomial name
- Endotricha consobrinalis Zeller, 1852

Synonyms
- Pyralis dissimulans Warren, 1897; Endotricha brunnea Warren, 1897; Endotricha jordana Hampson, 1900

Species of moth

Endotricha consobrinalis is a species of snout moth in the genus Endotricha. It was described by Philipp Christoph Zeller in 1852. It is found in Africa and the Middle East.

== Subspecies ==
- Endotricha consobrinalis consobrinalis (western Africa to southern Africa to eastern Africa as well as Palestine and Jordan)
- Endotricha consobrinalis meloui Whalley, 1963 (Madagascar)
