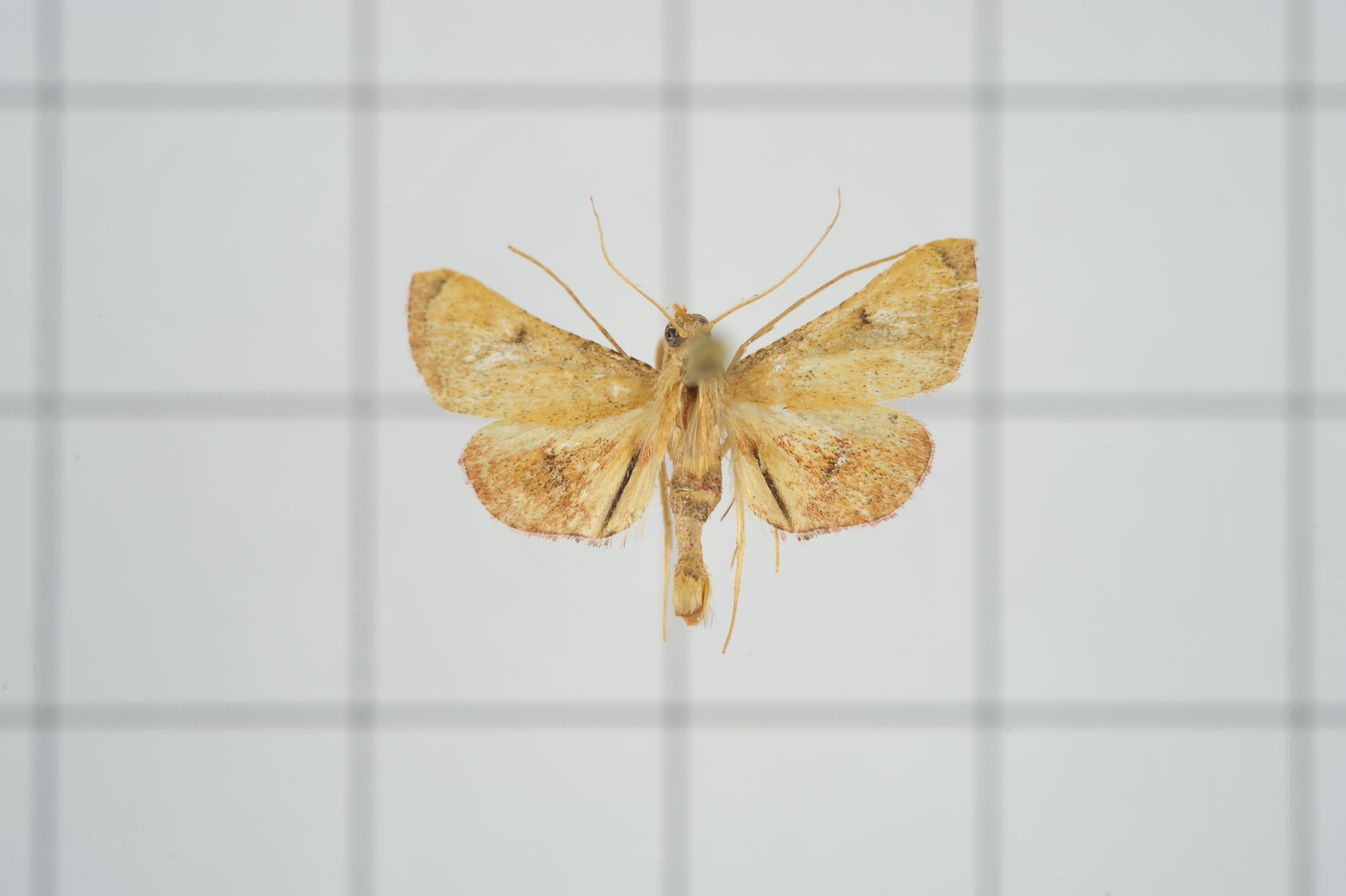

Scientific classification
- Kingdom: Animalia
- Phylum: Arthropoda
- Clade: Pancrustacea
- Class: Insecta
- Order: Lepidoptera
- Family: Pyralidae
- Genus: Endotricha
- Species: E. theonalis

Binomial name
- Endotricha theonalis (Walker, 1859)

Synonyms
- Pyralis theonalis Walker, 1859; Pyralis thermusalis Walker, 1859; Zania unicalis Walker, [1866]; Endotrichodes perustalis Ragonot, 1891; Endotricha hypogrammalis Hampson, 1906; Endotricha anpingia Strand, 1919

= Endotricha theonalis =

Species of moth

Endotricha theonalis is a species of snout moth in the genus Endotricha. It was described by Francis Walker in 1859, and is known from China (Guangdong, Hubei, Sichuan), Taiwan, and Japan.
