= Endotricha shafferi =

Scientific classification
- Kingdom: Animalia
- Phylum: Arthropoda
- Clade: Pancrustacea
- Class: Insecta
- Order: Lepidoptera
- Family: Pyralidae
- Genus: Endotricha
- Species: E. shafferi

Binomial name
- Endotricha shafferi Li, 2012

Species of moth

Endotricha shafferi is a species of snout moth in the genus Endotricha. It is found in China (Guangxi).

The wingspan is about 21 mm.
