= Endotricha borneoensis =

Scientific classification
- Kingdom: Animalia
- Phylum: Arthropoda
- Clade: Pancrustacea
- Class: Insecta
- Order: Lepidoptera
- Family: Pyralidae
- Genus: Endotricha
- Species: E. borneoensis

Binomial name
- Endotricha borneoensis Hampson, 1916

Species of moth

Endotricha borneoensis is a species of snout moth in the genus Endotricha. It was described by George Hampson in 1916, and is known from Borneo (from which its species epithet is derived), the Solomon Islands, New Guinea, and the Malay Archipelago.
