= Endotricha eximia =

Scientific classification
- Kingdom: Animalia
- Phylum: Arthropoda
- Clade: Pancrustacea
- Class: Insecta
- Order: Lepidoptera
- Family: Pyralidae
- Genus: Endotricha
- Species: E. eximia

Binomial name
- Endotricha eximia (Whalley, 1963)

Synonyms
- Endotrichia eximia Whalley, 1963

Species of moth

Endotricha eximia is a species of snout moth in the genus Endotricha. It is found in China (Guizhou, Sichuan) and India (Sikkim).
