= Endotricha minutiptera =

Scientific classification
- Kingdom: Animalia
- Phylum: Arthropoda
- Clade: Pancrustacea
- Class: Insecta
- Order: Lepidoptera
- Family: Pyralidae
- Genus: Endotricha
- Species: E. minutiptera

Binomial name
- Endotricha minutiptera H.H. Li, 2009

Species of moth

Endotricha minutiptera is a species of snout moth in the genus Endotricha. It was described by Hou-Hun Li in 2009, and is known from Hainan, China.

The wingspan is 11-11.5 mm.
