= Endotricha luteobasalis =

Scientific classification
- Kingdom: Animalia
- Phylum: Arthropoda
- Clade: Pancrustacea
- Class: Insecta
- Order: Lepidoptera
- Family: Pyralidae
- Genus: Endotricha
- Species: E. luteobasalis

Binomial name
- Endotricha luteobasalis Caradja, 1935

Species of moth

Endotricha luteobasalis is a species of snout moth in the genus Endotricha. It is found in China (Guizhou, Yunnan, Zhejiang).
