= Endotricha parki =

Conservation status
- Data Deficient (IUCN 3.1)

Scientific classification
- Kingdom: Animalia
- Phylum: Arthropoda
- Clade: Pancrustacea
- Class: Insecta
- Order: Lepidoptera
- Family: Pyralidae
- Genus: Endotricha
- Species: E. parki

Binomial name
- Endotricha parki B.W. Lee & Y.S. Bae, 2007

Species of moth

Endotricha parki is a species of snout moth in the genus Endotricha. It was described by B.W. Lee and Y.S. Bae in 2007. It is found in Korea.
