= Endotricha euphiles =

Scientific classification
- Kingdom: Animalia
- Phylum: Arthropoda
- Clade: Pancrustacea
- Class: Insecta
- Order: Lepidoptera
- Family: Pyralidae
- Genus: Endotricha
- Species: E. euphiles

Binomial name
- Endotricha euphiles Turner, 1932

Species of moth

Endotricha euphiles is a species of snout moth in the genus Endotricha. It was described by Turner in 1932, and is known from northern Queensland, Australia.
