= Endotricha bradleyi =

Scientific classification
- Kingdom: Animalia
- Phylum: Arthropoda
- Clade: Pancrustacea
- Class: Insecta
- Order: Lepidoptera
- Family: Pyralidae
- Genus: Endotricha
- Species: E. bradleyi

Binomial name
- Endotricha bradleyi Whalley, 1962

Species of moth

Endotricha bradleyi is a species of snout moth in the genus Endotricha. It was described by Paul E. S. Whalley in 1962, and is known from the Solomon Islands.
