= Endotricha valentis =

Scientific classification
- Kingdom: Animalia
- Phylum: Arthropoda
- Clade: Pancrustacea
- Class: Insecta
- Order: Lepidoptera
- Family: Pyralidae
- Genus: Endotricha
- Species: E. valentis

Binomial name
- Endotricha valentis Kirpichnikova, 2003

Species of moth

Endotricha valentis is a species of snout moth in the genus Endotricha. It was described by Valentina A. Kirpichnikova in 2003, and is known from China (Yunnan) and the Russian Far East.

The wingspan is 19–22 millimetres (0.75–0.87 in).
