= Endotricha approximalis =

Scientific classification
- Kingdom: Animalia
- Phylum: Arthropoda
- Clade: Pancrustacea
- Class: Insecta
- Order: Lepidoptera
- Family: Pyralidae
- Genus: Endotricha
- Species: E. approximalis

Binomial name
- Endotricha approximalis Snellen, 1895

Synonyms
- Endotricha xanthorhodalis Hampson, 1916; Endotricha periphaea Turner, 1937

Species of moth

Endotricha approximalis is a species of snout moth in the genus Endotricha. It is found in Java, the Philippines, the New Hebrides, Woodlark Island, New Guinea, Australia, China (Hainan) and Vanuatu.
