= Endosimilis =

Scientific classification
- Kingdom: Animalia
- Phylum: Arthropoda
- Class: Insecta
- Order: Lepidoptera
- Family: Pyralidae
- Tribe: Endotrichini
- Genus: Endosimilis; Whalley, 1961
- Species: E. stilbealis

Binomial name
- Endosimilis stilbealis (Walker, 1859)

Synonyms
- Pyralis stilbealis Walker, 1859; Endotricha heliopa Meyrick, 1884; Endotricha pyrocaustalis Lower, 1903

Genus of moths

Endosimilis is a monotypic snout moth genus described by Paul Ernest Sutton Whalley in 1961. Its only species, E. stilbealis, was described by Francis Walker in 1859 as Pyralis stilbealis. It is found in Australia.
