= Larodryas =

Scientific classification
- Kingdom: Animalia
- Phylum: Arthropoda
- Class: Insecta
- Order: Lepidoptera
- Family: Pyralidae
- Subfamily: Pyralinae
- Genus: Larodryas; Turner, 1922
- Species: L. haplocala

Binomial name
- Larodryas haplocala Turner, 1922

Genus of moths

Larodryas is a genus of snout moths. It was described by Alfred Jefferis Turner in 1922, and contains the species L. haplocala. It is found in Australia.
