= Endotricha punicea =

Scientific classification
- Kingdom: Animalia
- Phylum: Arthropoda
- Clade: Pancrustacea
- Class: Insecta
- Order: Lepidoptera
- Family: Pyralidae
- Genus: Endotricha
- Species: E. punicea

Binomial name
- Endotricha punicea Whalley, 1963

Species of moth

Endotricha punicea is a species of snout moth in the genus Endotricha. It was described by Paul Ernest Sutton Whalley in 1963, and is known from China (Henan, Hubei, Tibet).
