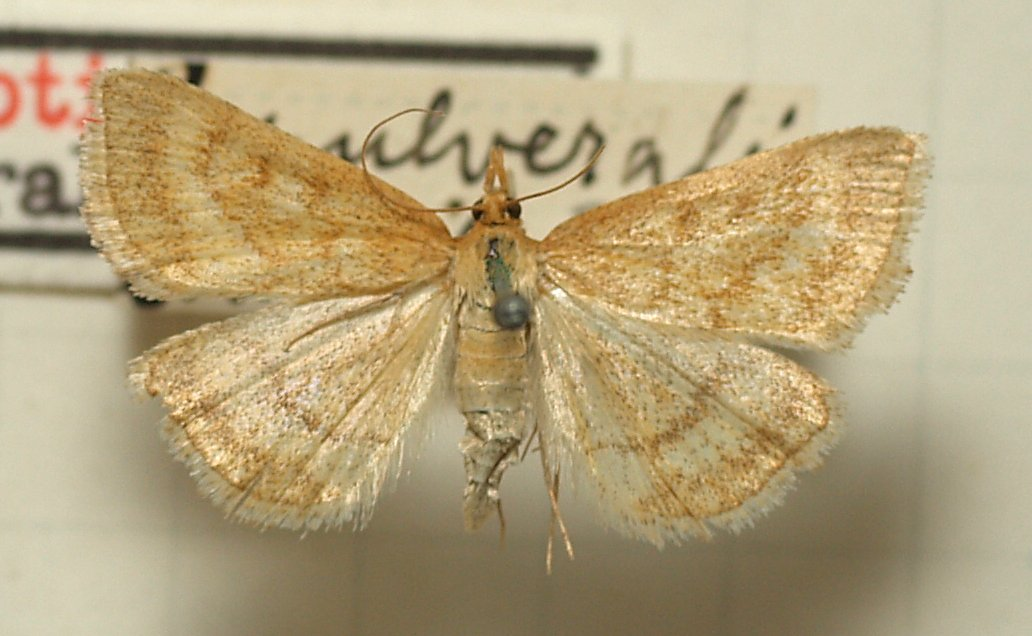

Scientific classification
- Kingdom: Animalia
- Phylum: Arthropoda
- Class: Insecta
- Order: Lepidoptera
- Family: Crambidae
- Subfamily: Pyraustinae
- Genus: Psammotis; Hübner, 1825

Synonyms
- Lemia Duponchel, 1845; Lemiodes Guenée, 1854; Psamotis Hübner, 1825

= Psammotis =

Genus of moths

Psammotis is a genus of moths of the family Crambidae. The genus was erected by Jacob Hübner in 1825.

== Species ==
- Psammotis orientalis Munroe & Mutuura, 1968
- Psammotis pulveralis Hübner, 1796
- Psammotis turkestanica Munroe & Mutuura, 1968

== Former species ==
- Psammotis decoloralis Turati, 1924
