= Paratalanta contractalis =

Scientific classification
- Domain: Eukaryota
- Kingdom: Animalia
- Phylum: Arthropoda
- Class: Insecta
- Order: Lepidoptera
- Family: Crambidae
- Genus: Paratalanta
- Species: P. contractalis

Binomial name
- Paratalanta contractalis Warren, 1896

Species of moth

Paratalanta contractalis is a moth in the family Crambidae. It was described by Warren in 1896. It is found in India.
