= Paratalanta aureolalis =

Scientific classification
- Domain: Eukaryota
- Kingdom: Animalia
- Phylum: Arthropoda
- Class: Insecta
- Order: Lepidoptera
- Family: Crambidae
- Genus: Paratalanta
- Species: P. aureolalis

Binomial name
- Paratalanta aureolalis (Lederer, 1863)

Synonyms
- Botys aureolalis Lederer, 1863; Pyralis ochrealis Moore, 1877

Species of moth

Paratalanta aureolalis is a moth in the family Crambidae. It was described by Julius Lederer in 1863. It is found in the Himalayas and on the Andaman Islands.
