= Paratalanta cultralis =

Scientific classification
- Kingdom: Animalia
- Phylum: Arthropoda
- Class: Insecta
- Order: Lepidoptera
- Family: Crambidae
- Genus: Paratalanta
- Species: P. cultralis

Binomial name
- Paratalanta cultralis (Staudinger, 1867)

Synonyms
- Botys cultralis Staudinger, 1867; Botys cultralis var. amurensis Romanoff, 1887

Species of moth

Paratalanta cultralis is a species of moth in the family Crambidae. It is found in Russia, Japan and Turkey.
