= Paratalanta ussurialis =

Scientific classification
- Domain: Eukaryota
- Kingdom: Animalia
- Phylum: Arthropoda
- Class: Insecta
- Order: Lepidoptera
- Family: Crambidae
- Genus: Paratalanta
- Species: P. ussurialis

Binomial name
- Paratalanta ussurialis (Bremer, 1864)

Synonyms
- Botyodes ussurialis Bremer, 1864; Botys labutonalis Lederer, 1871

Species of moth

Paratalanta ussurialis is a moth in the family Crambidae. It was described by Otto Vasilievich Bremer in 1864 and is found in the Russian Far East, Iran, Taiwan, and Japan.

== Subspecies ==
- Paratalanta ussurialis ussurialis
- Paratalanta ussurialis taiwanensis Yamanaka, 1972 (Taiwan)
