= Psammotis turkestanica =

Scientific classification
- Domain: Eukaryota
- Kingdom: Animalia
- Phylum: Arthropoda
- Class: Insecta
- Order: Lepidoptera
- Family: Crambidae
- Genus: Psammotis
- Species: P. turkestanica

Binomial name
- Psammotis turkestanica Munroe & Mutuura, 1968

Species of moth

Psammotis turkestanica is a moth in the family Crambidae. It was described by Eugene G. Munroe and Akira Mutuura in 1968. It is found in eastern Turkestan.
