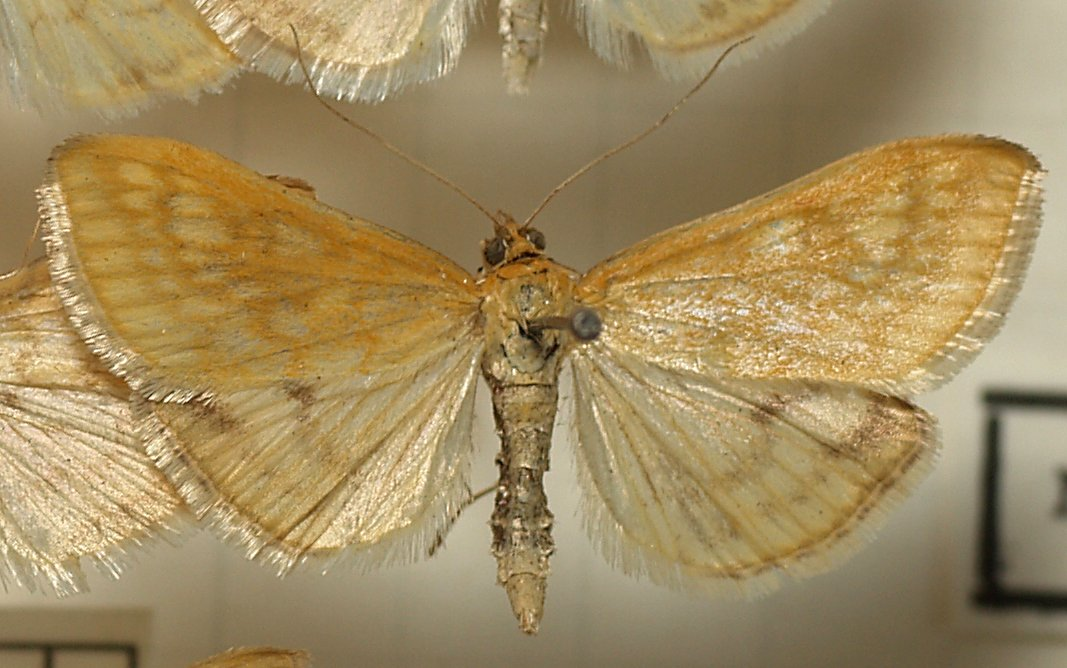
- Paratalanta pandalis

Scientific classification
- Domain: Eukaryota
- Kingdom: Animalia
- Phylum: Arthropoda
- Class: Insecta
- Order: Lepidoptera
- Family: Crambidae
- Subfamily: Pyraustinae
- Genus: Paratalanta; Meyrick, 1890

Synonyms
- Microstega Meyrick, 1890

= Paratalanta =

Genus of moths

Paratalanta is a genus of moths of the family Crambidae. Synonym is Microstega.

== Species ==
- Paratalanta acutangulata Swinhoe, 1901
- Paratalanta aureolalis (Lederer, 1863)
- Paratalanta contractalis Warren, 1896
- Paratalanta cultralis (Staudinger, 1867)
- Paratalanta hyalinalis (Hübner, 1796)
- Paratalanta pandalis (Hübner, 1825)
- Paratalanta stachialis Toll & Wojtusiak, 1957
- Paratalanta ussurialis (Bremer, 1864)

== Former species ==
- Paratalanta homoculorum (Bänziger, 1995)

== Sources ==
- Zhang, Dandan; Cai, Yanpeng; Li, Houhun (2013-01-06). "Taxonomic review of the genus Paratalanta Meyrick, 1890 (Lepidoptera: Crambidae: Pyraustinae) from China, with descriptions of two new species". Zootaxa. 3753 (2). doi:10.11646/zootaxa.3753.2.2. ISSN 1175-5334.
