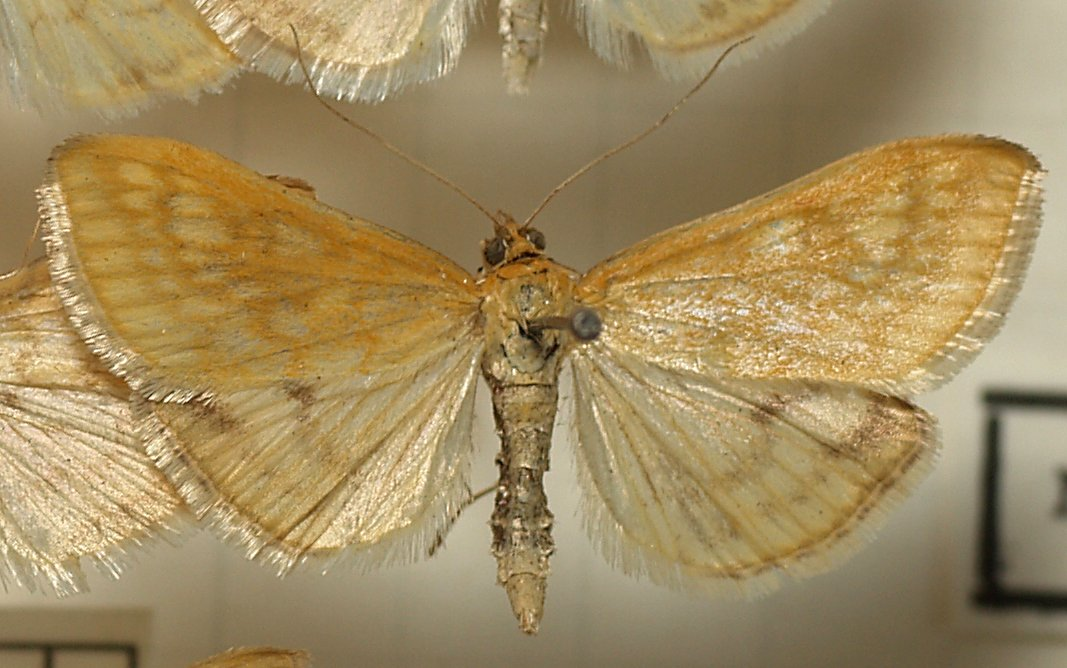

Scientific classification
- Domain: Eukaryota
- Kingdom: Animalia
- Phylum: Arthropoda
- Class: Insecta
- Order: Lepidoptera
- Family: Crambidae
- Genus: Paratalanta
- Species: P. pandalis

Binomial name
- Paratalanta pandalis (Hübner, 1825)

Synonyms
- Epicorsia pandalis Hübner, 1825; Microstega pandalis; Botis pandalis var. bergunensis Zeller, 1878; Botys jessica Butler, 1878; Botys oblitalis Duponchel, 1843; Botys thapsalis Treitschke, 1928; Pyralis angustalis Haworth, 1811; Pyralis verbascalis Hübner, 1796

= Paratalanta pandalis =

Species of moth

Paratalanta pandalis is a species of moth of the family Crambidae. It is found in the Palearctic including Europe.

The wingspan is 25–29 mm. The forewings are whitish-yellowish, towards costa suffused with pale grey; lines grey, first irregular, second subserrate, sinuate; orbicular dot and discal mark grey, sometimes obsolete; a serrate grey subterminal line, limiting a greyish -tinged terminal fascia. Hindwings yellow-whitish; sometimes a grey discal dot; posterior markings as in forewings. The larva is light pinkish-ochreous to dark grey, tinged with purplish- brown; dorsal line darker, pale-edged; spots.

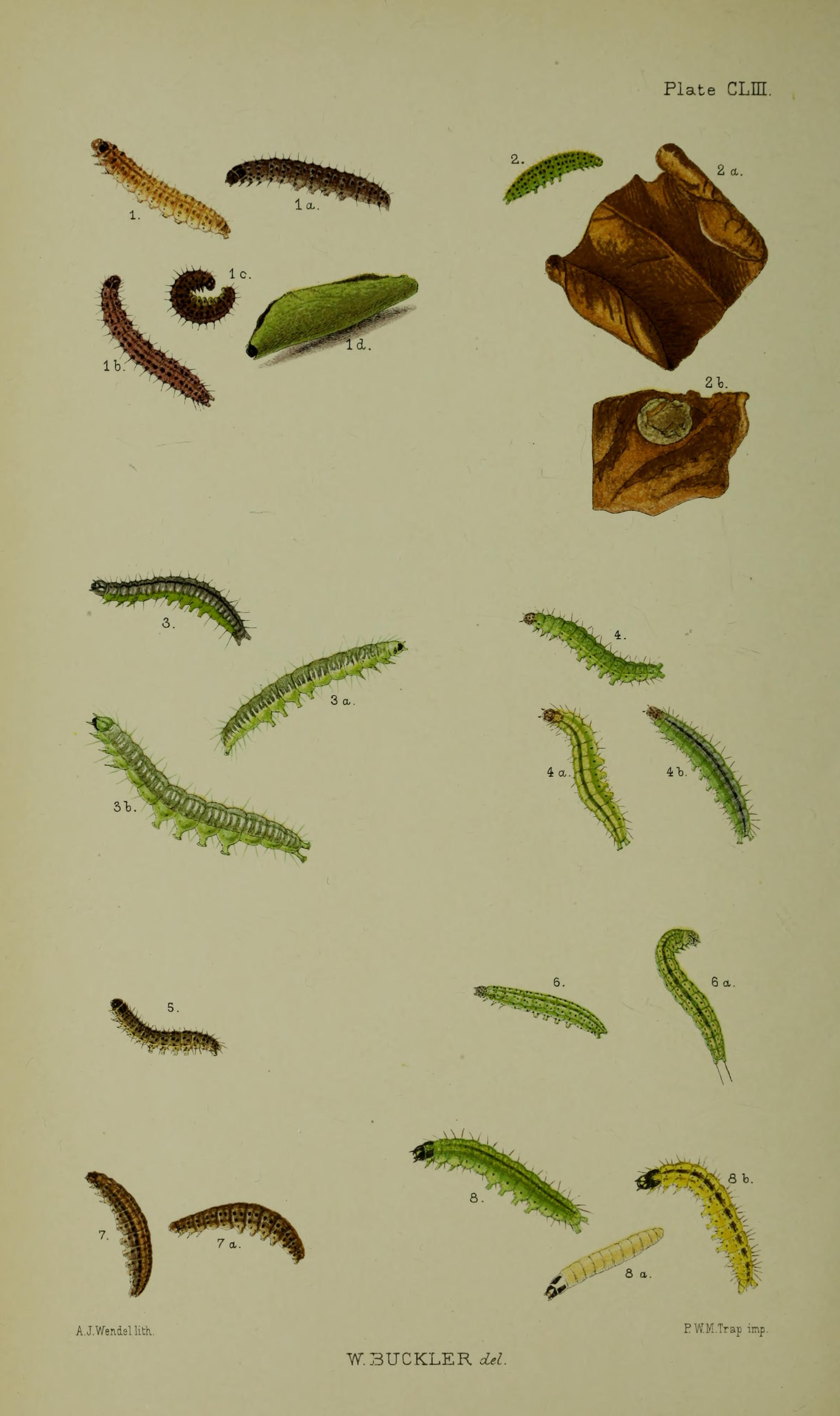
Figs.1, 1a, 1b, 1c larvae in various stages 1d rolled up leaf of foodplant

The moth flies from June to July depending on the location.

The larvae feed on nettle, Ballota, mint, Origanum vulgare, thyme, Myrica gale, goldenrod and Vicia sepium.
