= Psammotis orientalis =

Scientific classification
- Domain: Eukaryota
- Kingdom: Animalia
- Phylum: Arthropoda
- Class: Insecta
- Order: Lepidoptera
- Family: Crambidae
- Genus: Psammotis
- Species: P. orientalis

Binomial name
- Psammotis orientalis Munroe & Mutuura, 1968

Species of moth

Psammotis orientalis is a moth in the family Crambidae. It was described by Eugene G. Munroe and Akira Mutuura in 1968. It is found on the island of Hokkaido in Japan and in Russia.
