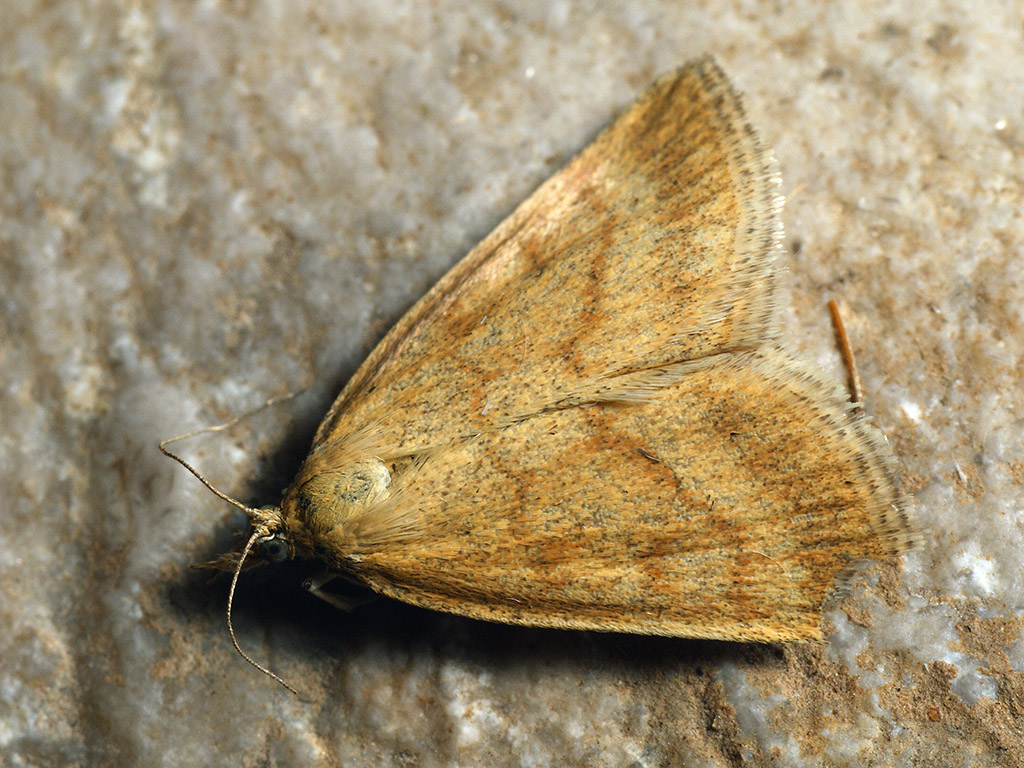

Scientific classification
- Domain: Eukaryota
- Kingdom: Animalia
- Phylum: Arthropoda
- Class: Insecta
- Order: Lepidoptera
- Family: Crambidae
- Genus: Psammotis
- Species: P. pulveralis

Binomial name
- Psammotis pulveralis (Hübner, 1796)

Synonyms
- Pyralis pulveralis Hübner, 1796; Botys pulveralis var. grisealis Staudinger, 1870

= Psammotis pulveralis =

Species of moth

Psammotis pulveralis is a moth of the family Crambidae described by Jacob Hübner in 1796. It is found in Iran and the southern part of Europe, although it dwells further north on occasion, and at times even establishes a short-lived population, as happened in 1869 near Folkestone and the Isle of Wight.

The wingspan is 23–25 mm. The moth flies from June to September depending on the location.

The larvae feed on water mint (Mentha aquatica) and gypsywort (Lycopus europaeus).
