= Paratalanta acutangulata =

Scientific classification
- Domain: Eukaryota
- Kingdom: Animalia
- Phylum: Arthropoda
- Class: Insecta
- Order: Lepidoptera
- Family: Crambidae
- Genus: Paratalanta
- Species: P. acutangulata

Binomial name
- Paratalanta acutangulata (C. Swinhoe, 1901)

Synonyms
- Pionea acutangulata C. Swinhoe, 1901

Species of moth

Paratalanta acutangulata is a moth in the family Crambidae. It was described by Charles Swinhoe in 1901. It is found in Meghalaya, India.
