= Paratalanta stachialis =

Scientific classification
- Domain: Eukaryota
- Kingdom: Animalia
- Phylum: Arthropoda
- Class: Insecta
- Order: Lepidoptera
- Family: Crambidae
- Genus: Paratalanta
- Species: P. stachialis

Binomial name
- Paratalanta stachialis Toll & Wojtusiak, 1957

Species of moth

Paratalanta stachialis is a moth in the family Crambidae. It was described by Sergiusz Graf von Toll and Roman Wojtusiak in 1957. It is found in Jilin, China.
