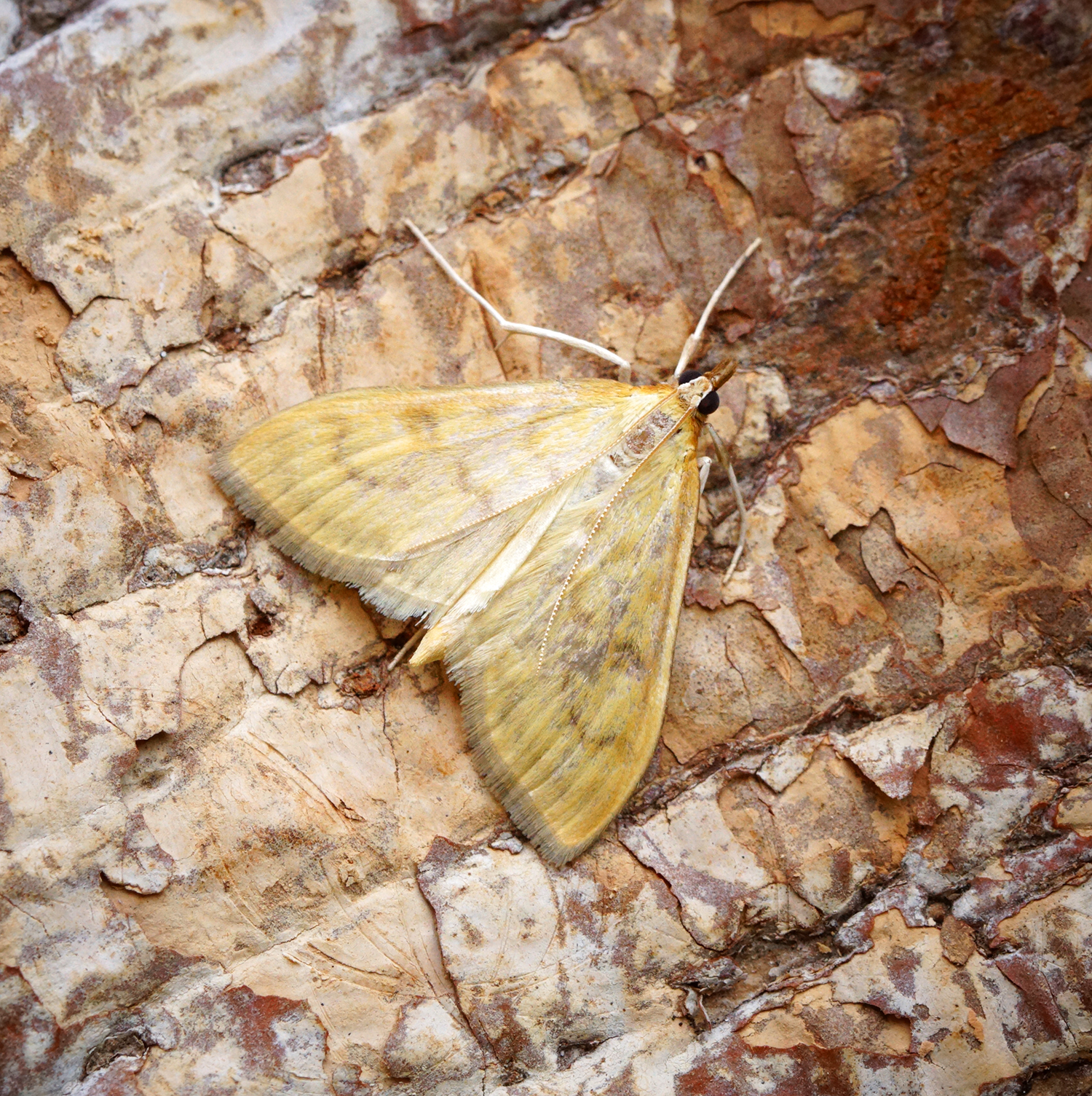

Scientific classification
- Domain: Eukaryota
- Kingdom: Animalia
- Phylum: Arthropoda
- Class: Insecta
- Order: Lepidoptera
- Family: Crambidae
- Genus: Paratalanta
- Species: P. hyalinalis

Binomial name
- Paratalanta hyalinalis (Hübner, 1796)

Synonyms
- Pyralis hyalinalis Hübner, 1796; Psammotis decoloralis Turati, 1924

= Paratalanta hyalinalis =

Species of moth

Paratalanta hyalinalis, the translucent pearl, is a species of moth of the family Crambidae. It was described by Jacob Hübner in 1796.

== Description ==
The wingspan of Paratalanta hyalinalis can reach 28–35 millimetres (1.1–1.4 in). The moth flies from June to July depending on the location. They are active after dark. The larvae are oligophagous (feed on only a few types of food) and eat nettle, Verbascum thapsus and Centaurea jacea.

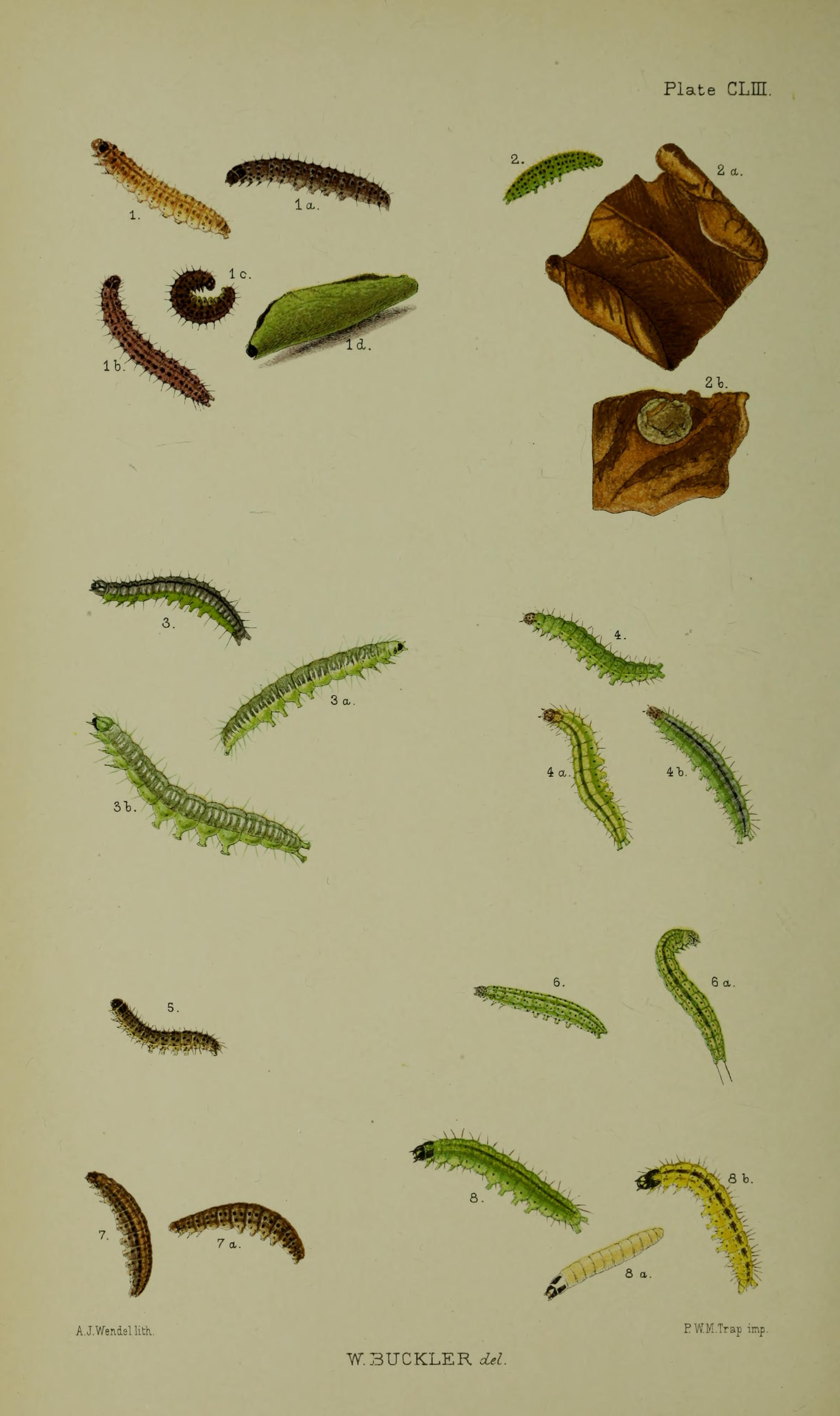
Figs.2 larva after final moult 2a two hibernacula on part of a beech leaf 2b hibernaculum with top leaf removed

== Distribution ==
This species can be found in most of Europe, but has also been recorded from North Africa, including Libya.
