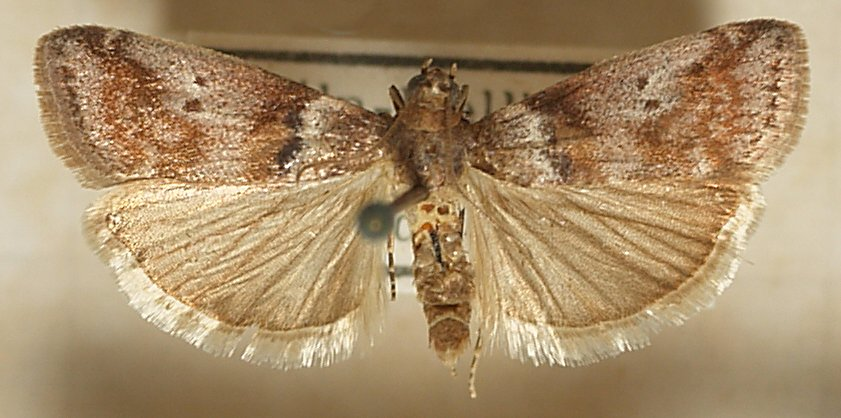

Scientific classification
- Kingdom: Animalia
- Phylum: Arthropoda
- Clade: Pancrustacea
- Class: Insecta
- Order: Lepidoptera
- Family: Pyralidae
- Genus: Acrobasis
- Species: A. consociella

Binomial name
- Acrobasis consociella (Hübner, 1813)

Synonyms
- Tinea consociella Hübner, 1813; Acrobasis nuragha Roesler, 1988; Acrobasis consociella jessica Roesler, 1988; Nephopterix consocialis Hübner, 1825; Acrobasis oberthueri D. Lucas, 1914; Phycis tumidella Duponchel, 1837

= Acrobasis consociella =

Species of moth

Acrobasis consociella is a moth of the family Pyralidae. It is found in Europe.

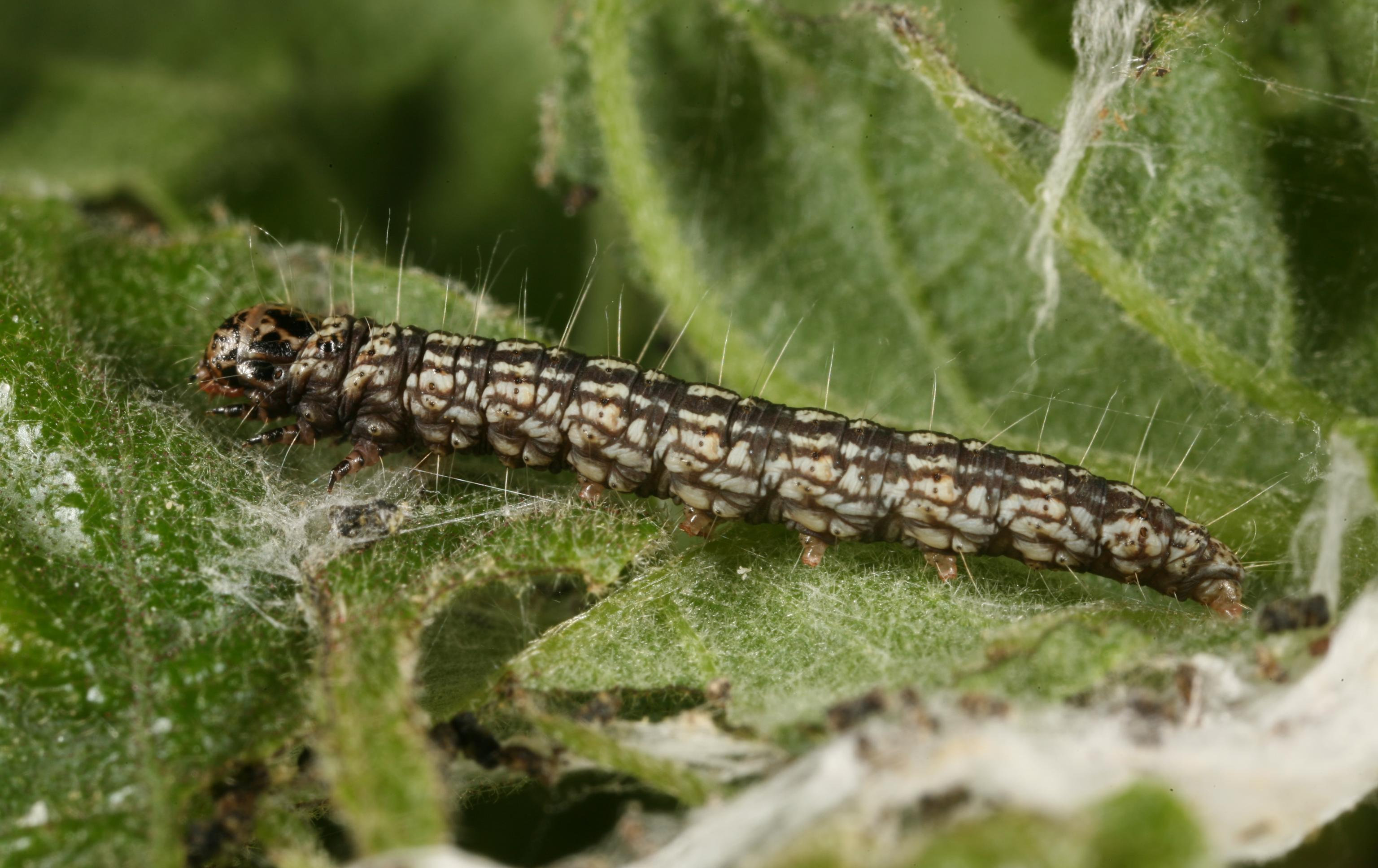
Acrobasis consociella larva

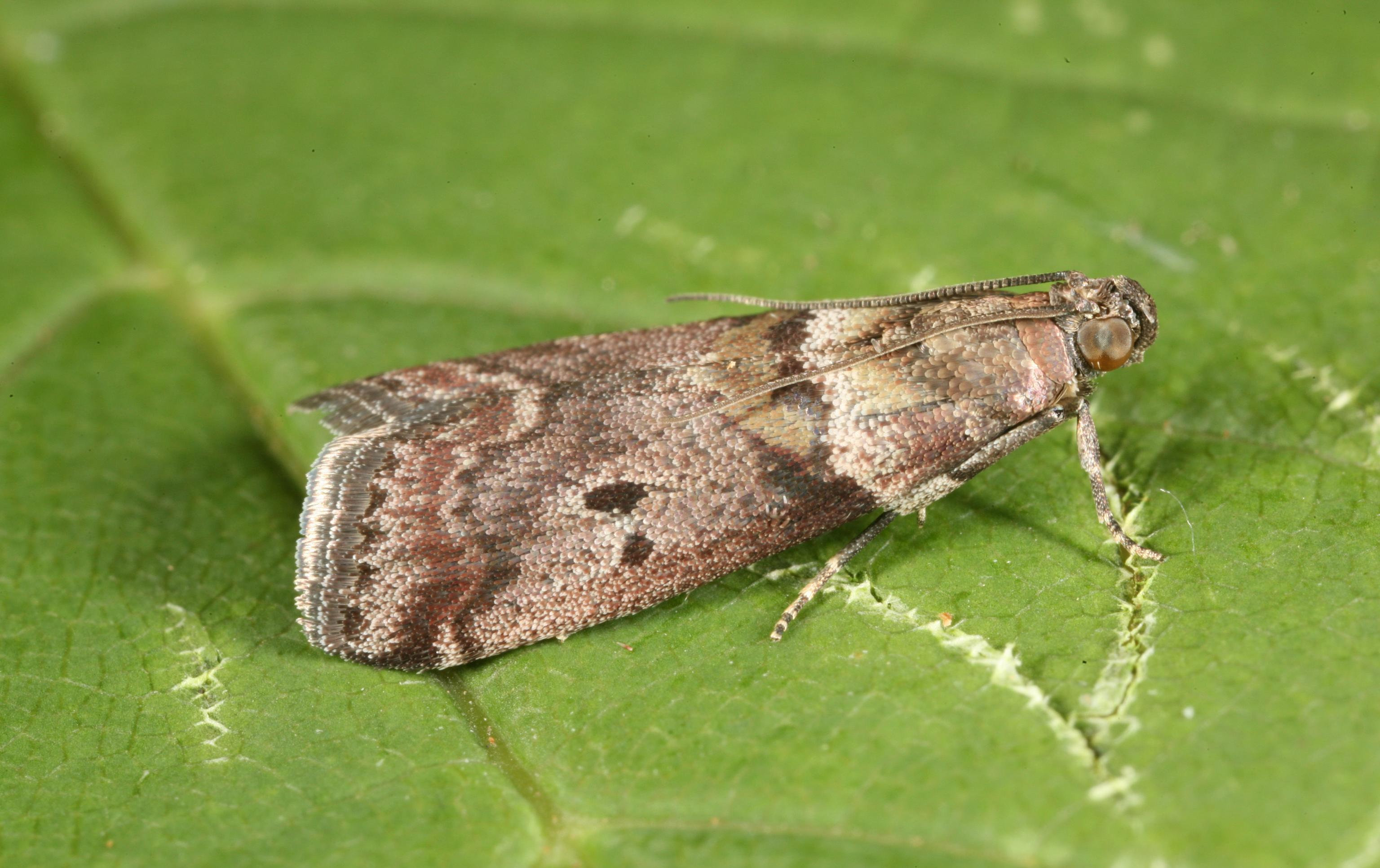
Moth on an oak leaf

The wingspan is 19–22 mm. It is very similar to Acrobasis sodalella Meyrick describes it Differs from A. sodalellaonly as follows: forewings mixed or sometimes much suffused with dark fuscous, basal area distinctly paler, more mixed with ochreous-whitish, first line less distinct, browner. Larva pale grey, tinged with yellowish or greenish; subdorsal, and lateral lines dark grey; a whitish black-ringed lateral spot on 3; head and plate of 2 yellow-brownish, darker dotted: in a silken gallery amongst spun leaves of oak; 5, 6.

The moth flies in one generation from the end of May to August. The larva feeds on oak.
