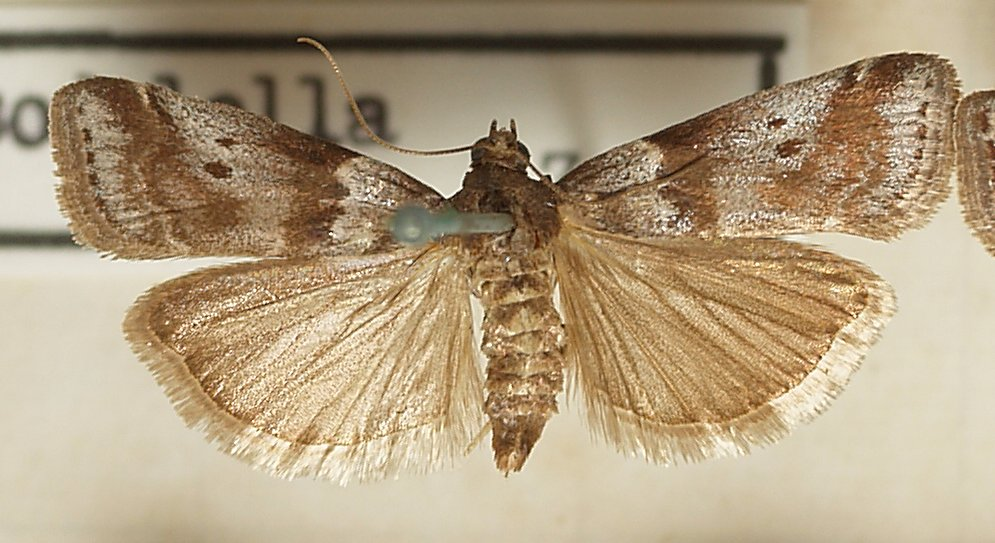

Scientific classification
- Kingdom: Animalia
- Phylum: Arthropoda
- Clade: Pancrustacea
- Class: Insecta
- Order: Lepidoptera
- Family: Pyralidae
- Genus: Acrobasis
- Species: A. sodalella

Binomial name
- Acrobasis sodalella Zeller, 1848

= Acrobasis sodalella =

Species of moth

Acrobasis sodalella is a moth of the family Pyralidae. It was described by Philipp Christoph Zeller in 1848 and is found in Europe.

The moth flies in one generation from June to July.

The larvae feed on oak.
