= Insalebria concineratella =

Scientific classification
- Domain: Eukaryota
- Kingdom: Animalia
- Phylum: Arthropoda
- Class: Insecta
- Order: Lepidoptera
- Family: Pyralidae
- Genus: Insalebria
- Species: I. concineratella

Binomial name
- Insalebria concineratella (Ragonot, 1887)

Synonyms
- Nephopteryx concineratella Ragonot, 1887

Species of moth

Insalebria concineratella is a species of snout moth in the genus Insalebria. It was described by Ragonot in 1887, and is known from Kazakhstan.
