= Insalebria =

Scientific classification
- Domain: Eukaryota
- Kingdom: Animalia
- Phylum: Arthropoda
- Class: Insecta
- Order: Lepidoptera
- Family: Pyralidae
- Subfamily: Phycitinae
- Genus: Insalebria; Filipjev, 1924

Synonyms
- Serrulacera Amsel, 1955

Genus of moths

Insalebria is a genus of snout moths described by Filipjev in 1924.

== Species ==
- Insalebria concineratella (Ragonot, 1887)
- Insalebria kozhantshikovi Filipjev, 1924
- Insalebria serraticornella (Zeller, 1839)
