= Insalebria serraticornella =

Scientific classification
- Kingdom: Animalia
- Phylum: Arthropoda
- Clade: Pancrustacea
- Class: Insecta
- Order: Lepidoptera
- Family: Pyralidae
- Genus: Insalebria
- Species: I. serraticornella

Binomial name
- Insalebria serraticornella (Zeller, 1839)

Synonyms
- Nephopteryx serraticornella Zeller, 1839; Serrulacera serraticornella; Insalebria serraticornella kairouanensis Leraut, 2003; Phycis gregella Eversmann, 1844; Nephopteryx serraticornella rungsella D. Lucas, 1942; Pterothrix ifraneella D. Lucas, 1956

Species of moth

Insalebria serraticornella is a species of snout moth in the genus Insalebria. It was described by Zeller in 1839, and is known from Tunisia, Morocco, Slovakia, the Balkan Peninsula, Ukraine, Russia and Turkey.
