= Insalebria kozhantshikovi =

Scientific classification
- Domain: Eukaryota
- Kingdom: Animalia
- Phylum: Arthropoda
- Class: Insecta
- Order: Lepidoptera
- Family: Pyralidae
- Genus: Insalebria
- Species: I. kozhantshikovi

Binomial name
- Insalebria kozhantshikovi Filipjev, 1924

Species of moth

Insalebria kozhantshikovi is a species of snout moth in the genus Insalebria. It was described by Ivan Nikolayevich Filipjev in 1924 and is known from Russia.
