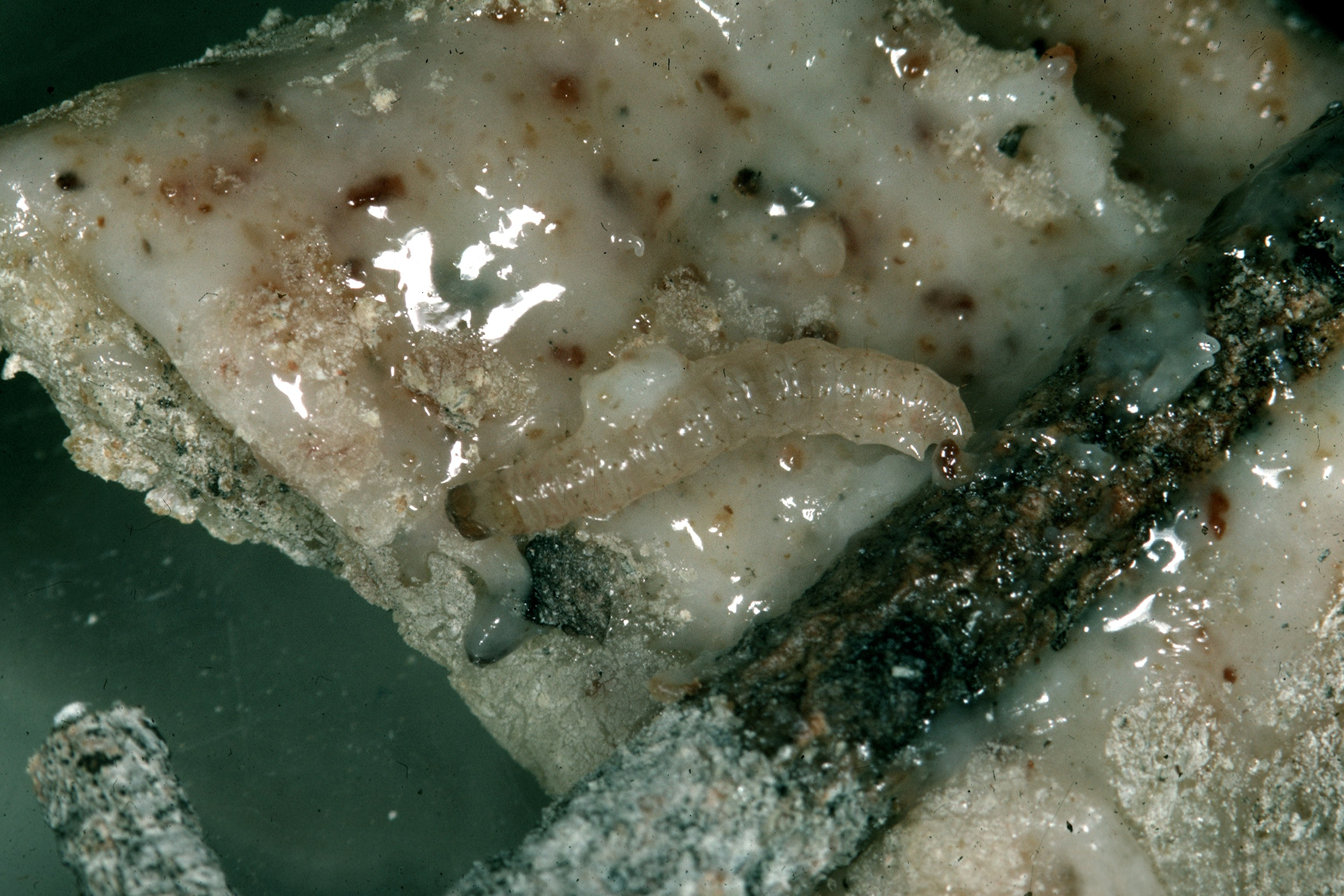

Scientific classification
- Domain: Eukaryota
- Kingdom: Animalia
- Phylum: Arthropoda
- Class: Insecta
- Order: Lepidoptera
- Family: Pyralidae
- Genus: Dioryctria
- Species: D. ponderosae

Binomial name
- Dioryctria ponderosae Dyar, 1914

= Dioryctria ponderosae =

Species of moth

Dioryctria ponderosae, the ponderosa twig moth, is a moth of the family Pyralidae. The species was first described by Harrison Gray Dyar Jr. in 1914. It is found in North America from Washington and Montana south to California and northern Mexico.

The larvae feed on Pinus ponderosa.

== Gallery ==
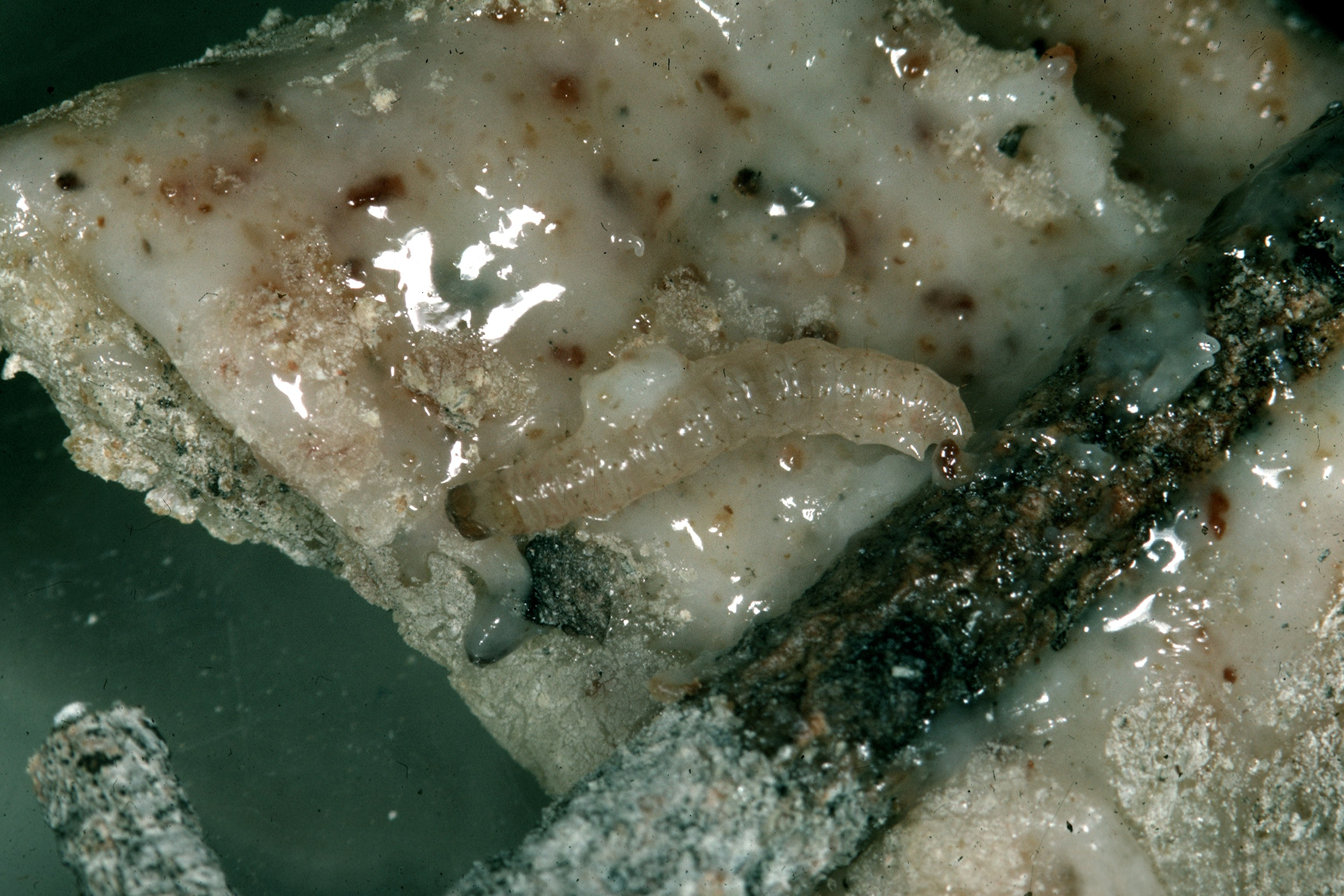
Larva

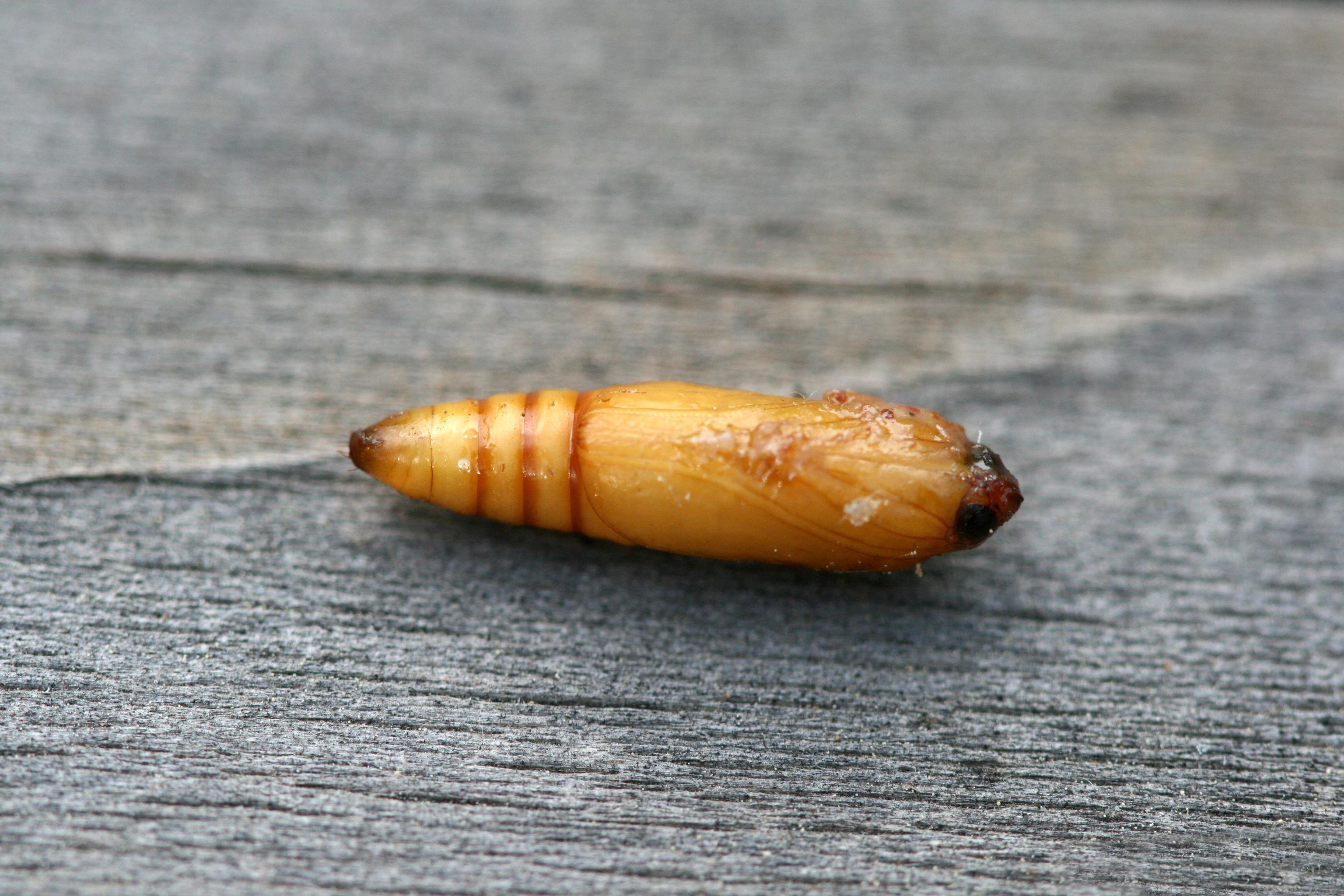
Pupa
