= Dioryctria symphoniella =

Scientific classification
- Kingdom: Animalia
- Phylum: Arthropoda
- Class: Insecta
- Order: Lepidoptera
- Family: Pyralidae
- Genus: Dioryctria
- Species: D. symphoniella

Binomial name
- Dioryctria symphoniella (Hampson, 1899)

Synonyms
- Phycita symphoniella Hampson, 1899

Species of moth

Dioryctria symphoniella is a species of snout moth in the genus Dioryctria. It was described by George Hampson in 1899 and is known from Assam, India.
