= Dioryctria monticolella =

Scientific classification
- Domain: Eukaryota
- Kingdom: Animalia
- Phylum: Arthropoda
- Class: Insecta
- Order: Lepidoptera
- Family: Pyralidae
- Genus: Dioryctria
- Species: D. monticolella

Binomial name
- Dioryctria monticolella Mutuura, Munroe & Ross, 1969

Species of moth

Dioryctria monticolella is a species of snout moth in the genus Dioryctria. It was described by Akira Mutuura, Eugene G. Munroe and Douglas Alexander Ross in 1969, and it is known from southern British Columbia, Canada.
