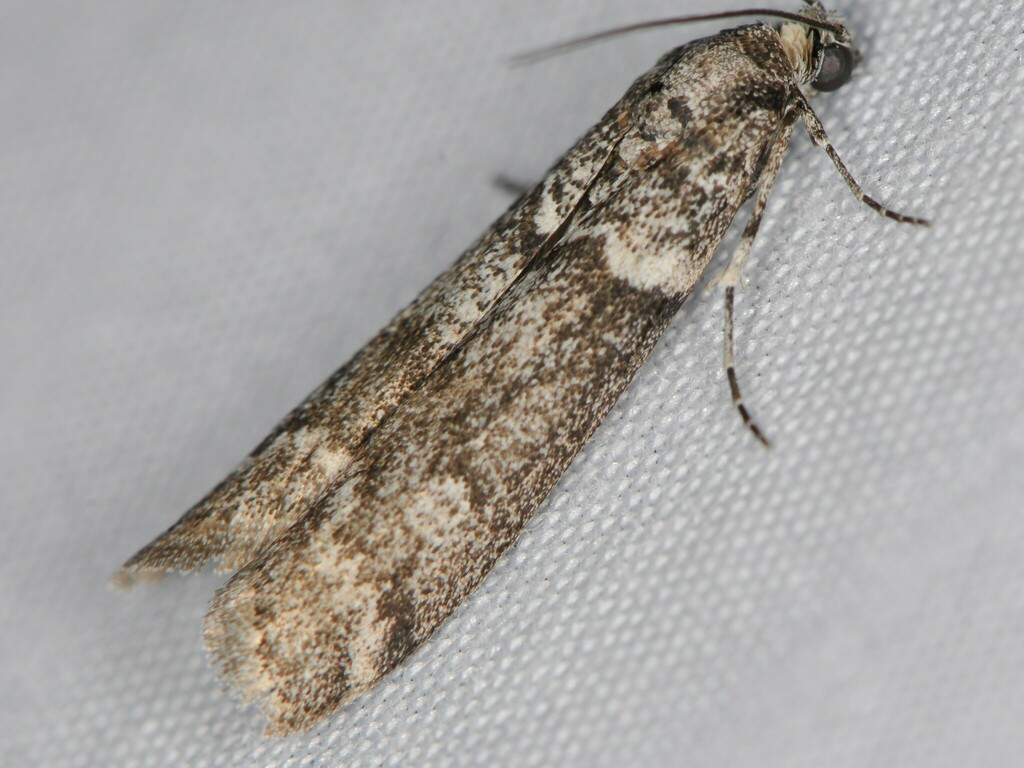

Scientific classification
- Domain: Eukaryota
- Kingdom: Animalia
- Phylum: Arthropoda
- Class: Insecta
- Order: Lepidoptera
- Family: Pyralidae
- Genus: Dioryctria
- Species: D. gulosella

Binomial name
- Dioryctria gulosella (Hulst, 1890)

Synonyms
- Acrobasis gulosella Hulst, 1890

= Dioryctria gulosella =

Species of moth

Dioryctria gulosella is a species of snout moth in the genus Dioryctria. It was described by George Duryea Hulst in 1890 and is known from the United States, including Colorado, New Mexico and California.

The wingspan is 21–27 mm. The forewings are dark gray with a fine, sparse, white dusting, making the general color a dark ash gray. The hindwings are white, but smoky at the apex and somewhat along the termen.
