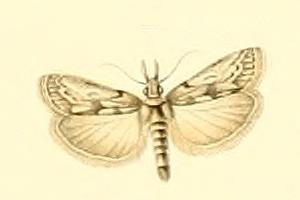

Scientific classification
- Domain: Eukaryota
- Kingdom: Animalia
- Phylum: Arthropoda
- Class: Insecta
- Order: Lepidoptera
- Family: Pyralidae
- Genus: Dioryctria
- Species: D. robiniella

Binomial name
- Dioryctria robiniella (Millière, 1865)

Synonyms
- Myelois robiniella Millière, 1865; Dioryctriodes daelei Mutuura & Munroe, 1974

= Dioryctria robiniella =

Species of moth

Dioryctria robiniella is a species of snout moth in the genus Dioryctria. It was described by Pierre Millière in 1865, and is known from France, Spain, Croatia and Italy.

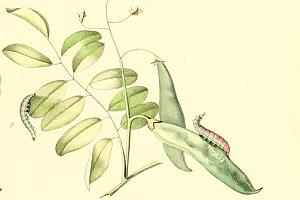
Larva

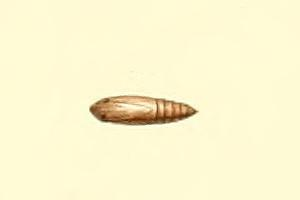
Pupa

The wingspan is 21–22 mm.
