= Dioryctria stenopterella =

Scientific classification
- Domain: Eukaryota
- Kingdom: Animalia
- Phylum: Arthropoda
- Class: Insecta
- Order: Lepidoptera
- Family: Pyralidae
- Genus: Dioryctria
- Species: D. stenopterella

Binomial name
- Dioryctria stenopterella Amsel, 1960

Species of moth

Dioryctria stenopterella is a species of snout moth in the genus Dioryctria. It was described by Hans Georg Amsel in 1960 and is known from Iran.
