= Dioryctria okui =

Scientific classification
- Domain: Eukaryota
- Kingdom: Animalia
- Phylum: Arthropoda
- Class: Insecta
- Order: Lepidoptera
- Family: Pyralidae
- Genus: Dioryctria
- Species: D. okui

Binomial name
- Dioryctria okui Mutuura, 1958

Species of moth

Dioryctria okui is a species of snout moth in the genus Dioryctria. It was described by Akira Mutuura in 1958 and is known from Japan.

The larvae feed on the foliage of spruce.
