= Dioryctria resiniphila =

Scientific classification
- Kingdom: Animalia
- Phylum: Arthropoda
- Class: Insecta
- Order: Lepidoptera
- Family: Pyralidae
- Genus: Dioryctria
- Species: D. resiniphila

Binomial name
- Dioryctria resiniphila Segerer & Pröse, 1997

Species of moth

Dioryctria resiniphila is a species of snout moth in the genus Dioryctria. It was described by Segerer and Pröse, in 1997, and it was described from Greece. It was recorded from China in 2009.

The wingspan is 26–30 mm.

The larvae feed on Abies cephalonica. They feed in the cones of their host plant.
