= Dioryctria nivaliensis =

Scientific classification
- Domain: Eukaryota
- Kingdom: Animalia
- Phylum: Arthropoda
- Class: Insecta
- Order: Lepidoptera
- Family: Pyralidae
- Genus: Dioryctria
- Species: D. nivaliensis

Binomial name
- Dioryctria nivaliensis Rebel, 1892

Species of moth

Dioryctria nivaliensis is a species of snout moth in the genus Dioryctria. It was described by Rebel in 1892, and is known from the Canary Islands.

The larvae feed on Pinus canariensis.
