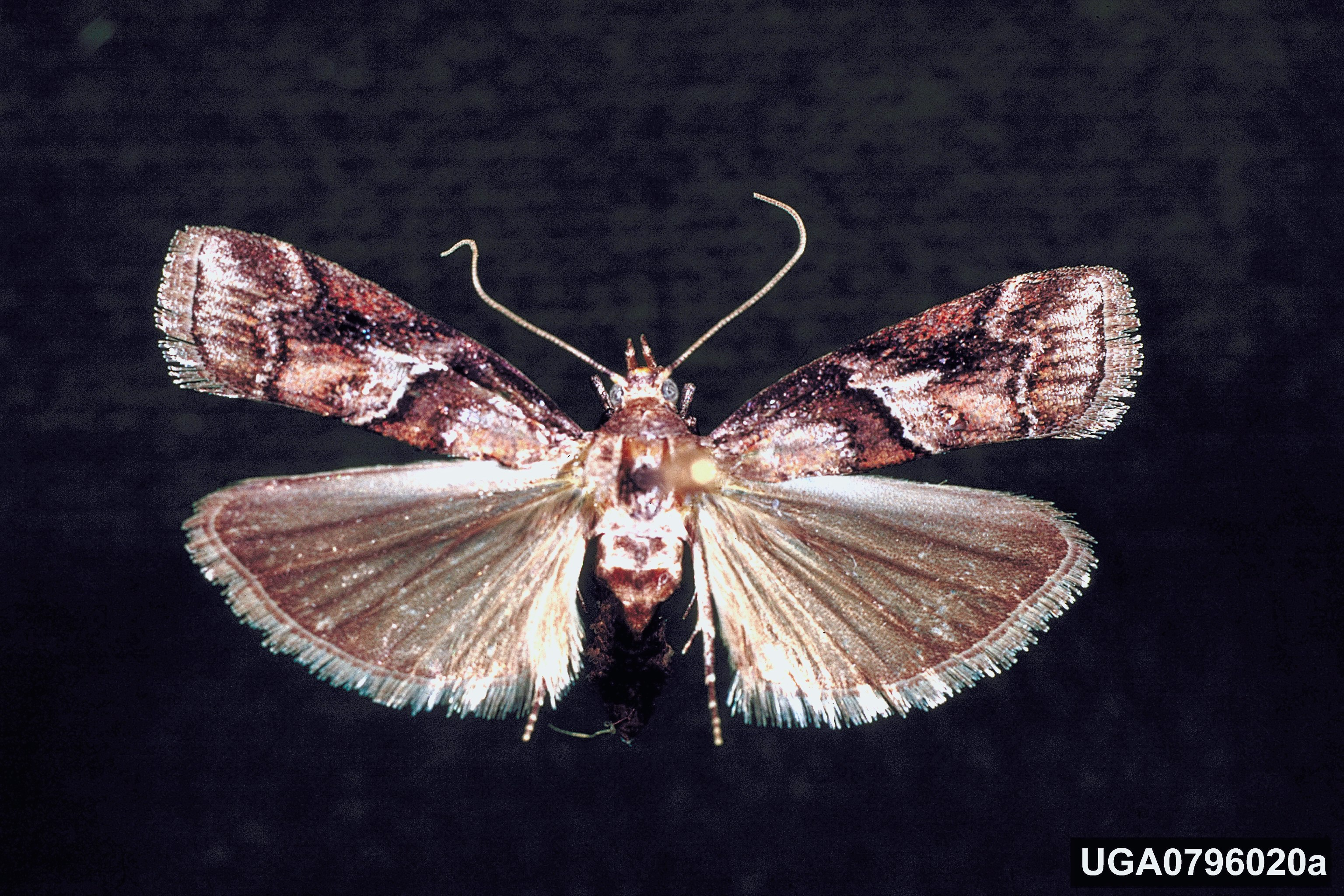

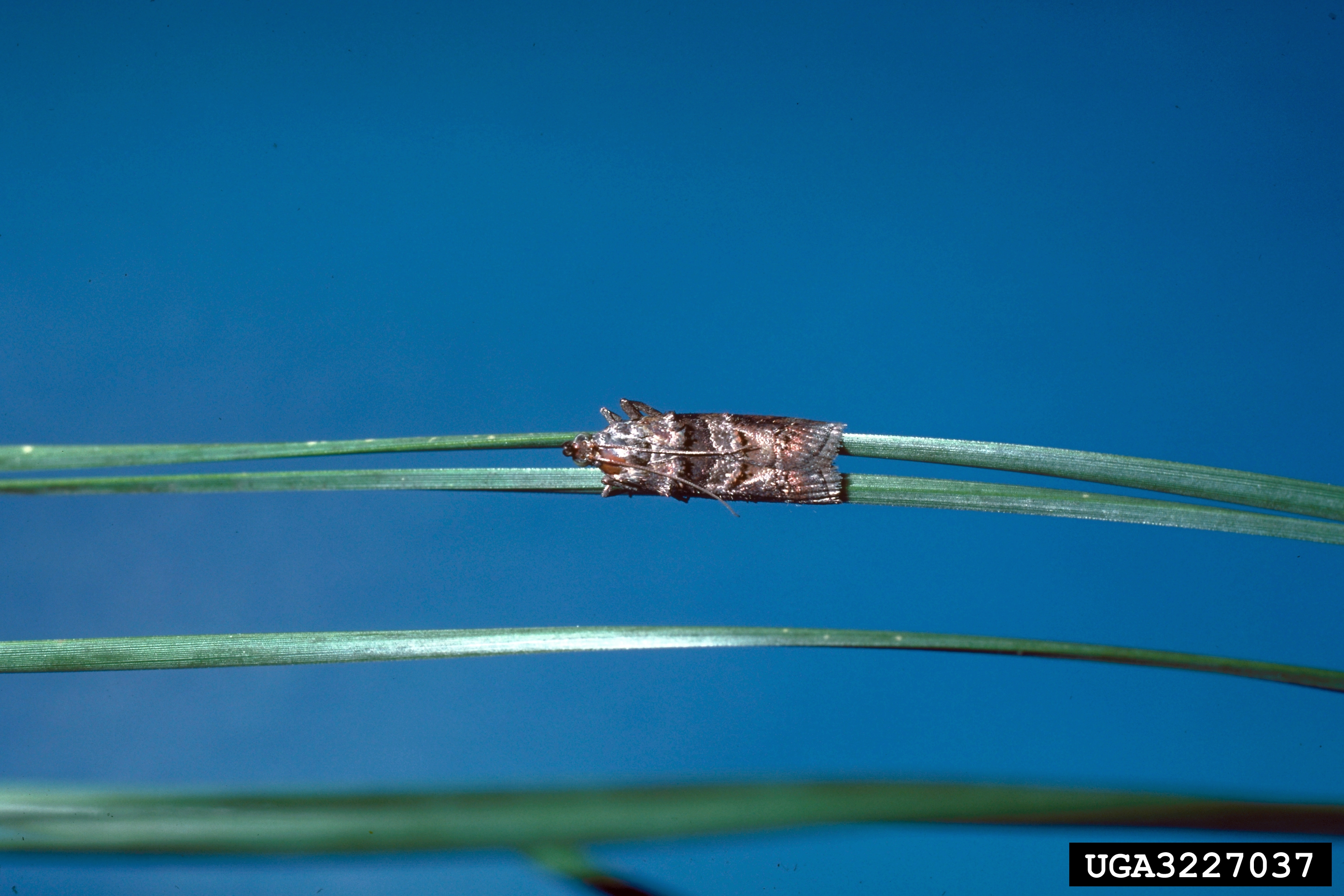

Scientific classification
- Kingdom: Animalia
- Phylum: Arthropoda
- Class: Insecta
- Order: Lepidoptera
- Family: Pyralidae
- Genus: Dioryctria
- Species: D. clarioralis

Binomial name
- Dioryctria clarioralis (Walker, 1863)

Synonyms
- Nephopteryx clarioralis Walker, 1863; Ulophora brunneella Dyar, 1904

= Dioryctria clarioralis =

Species of moth

Dioryctria clarioralis, the blister coneworm moth, is a moth of the family Pyralidae. It is found in the eastern United States, including Florida, New Jersey and Virginia.

The larvae feed on various Pinus species, including Pinus palustris. They have been reported attacking the flower cluster and shoots of their host plant.

== Gallery ==
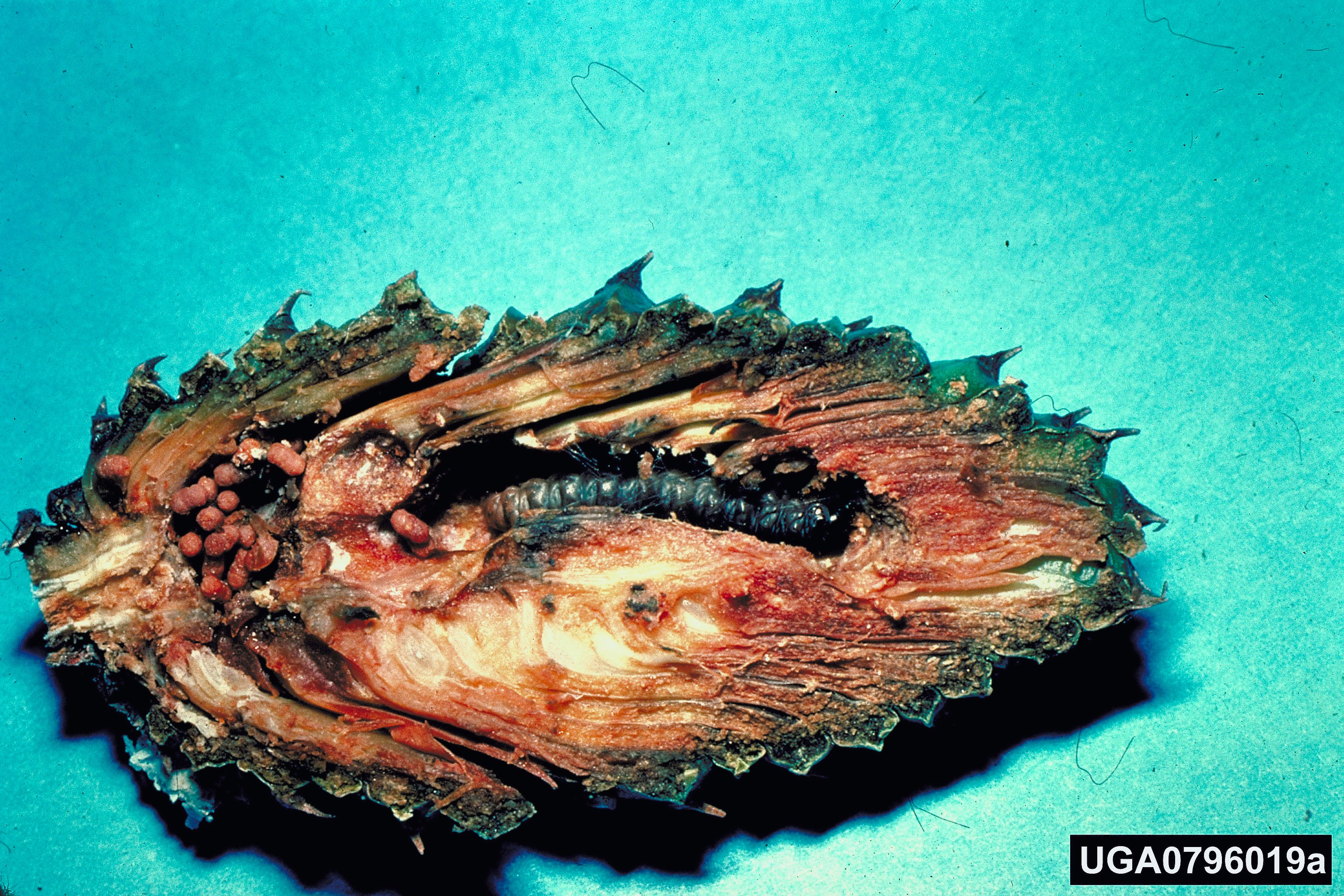
Larva

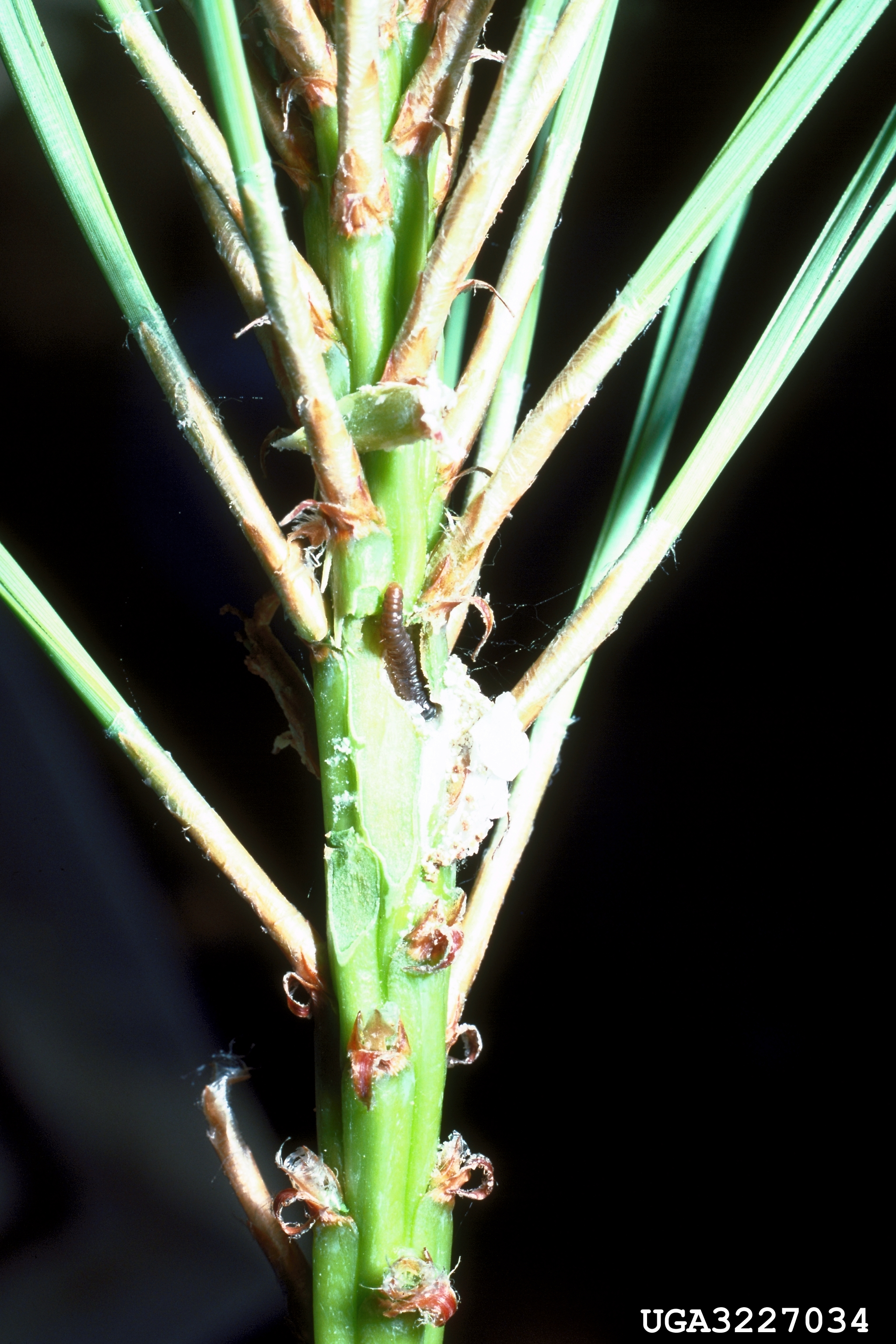
Larva

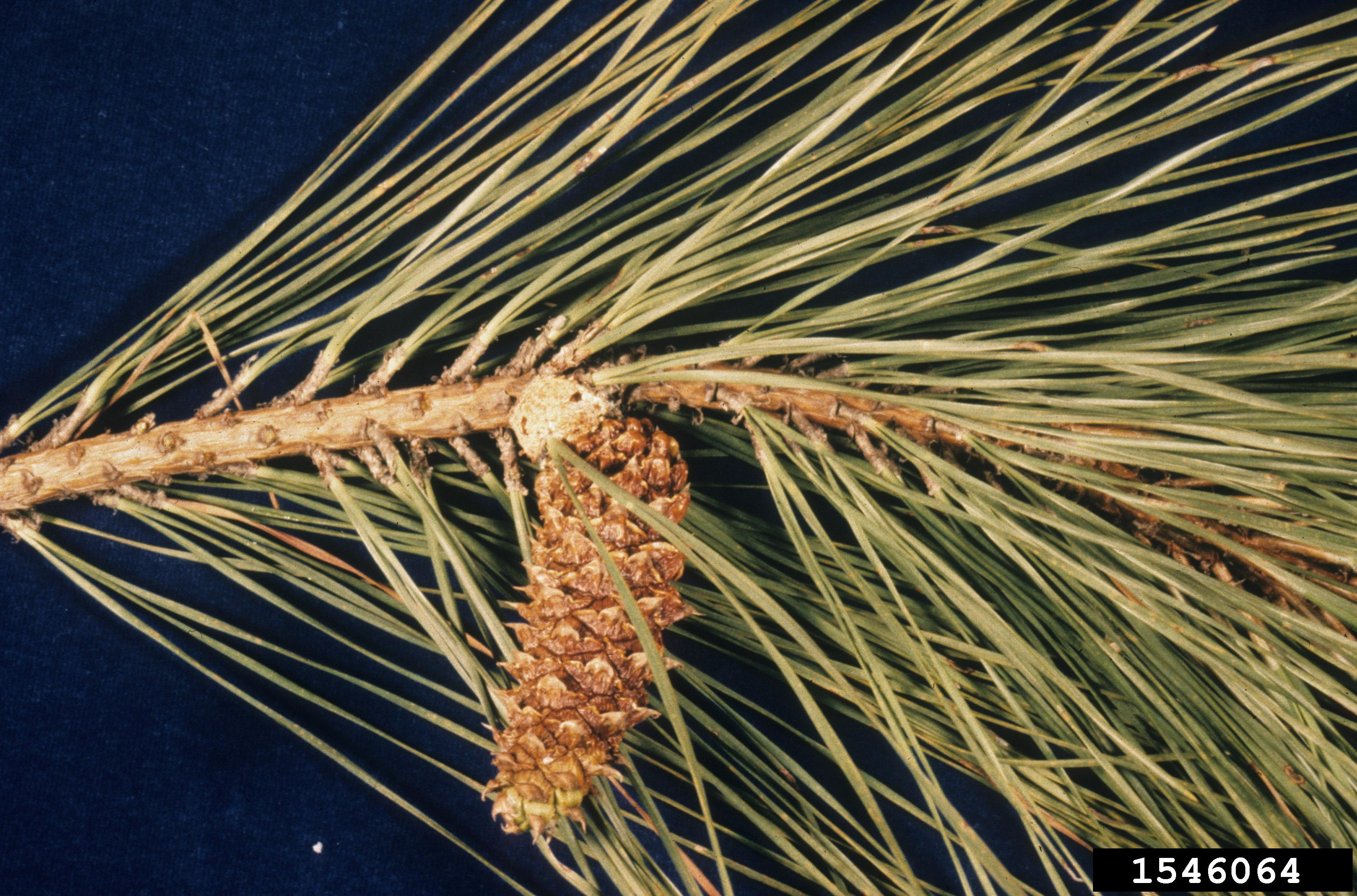
Damage

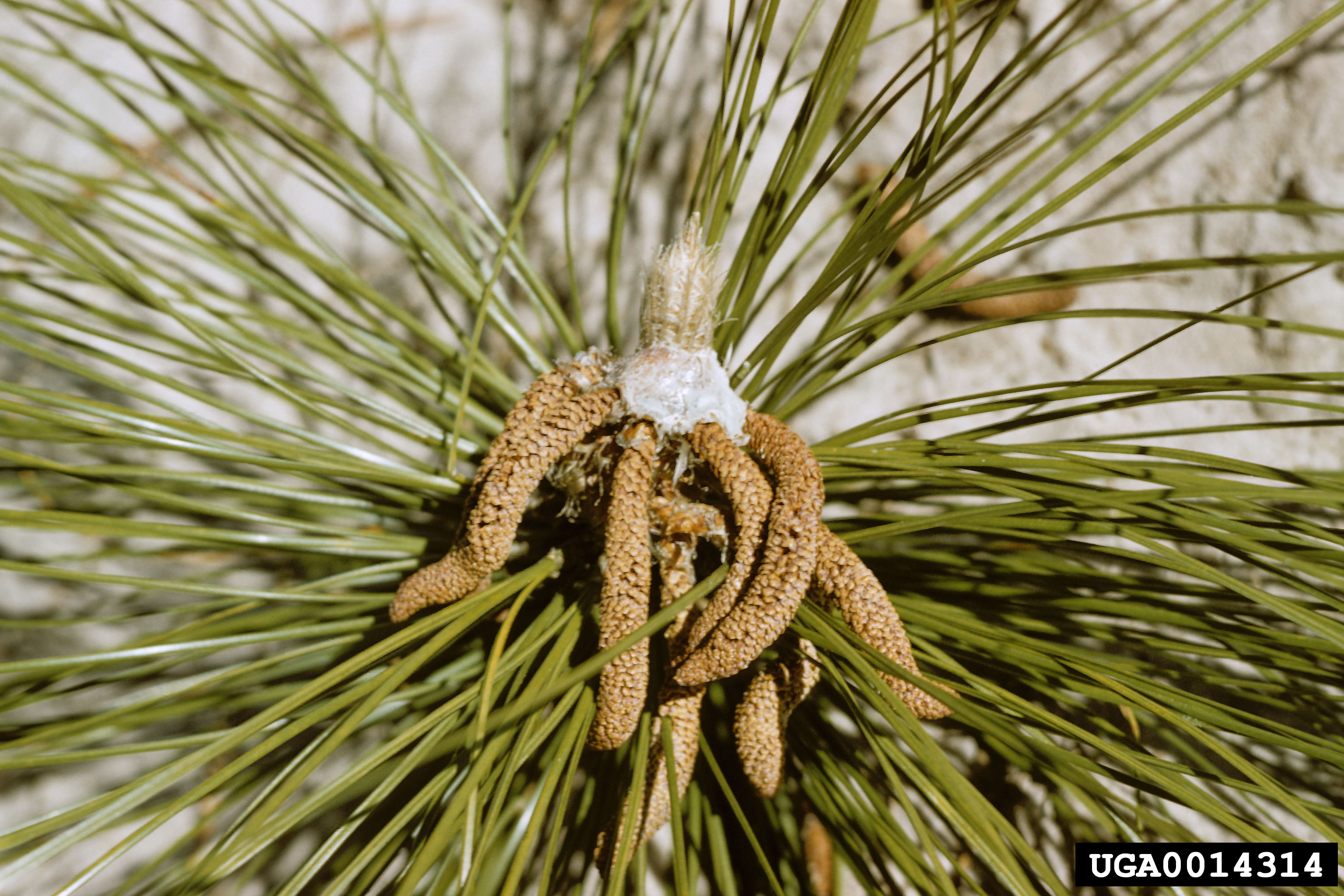
Damage

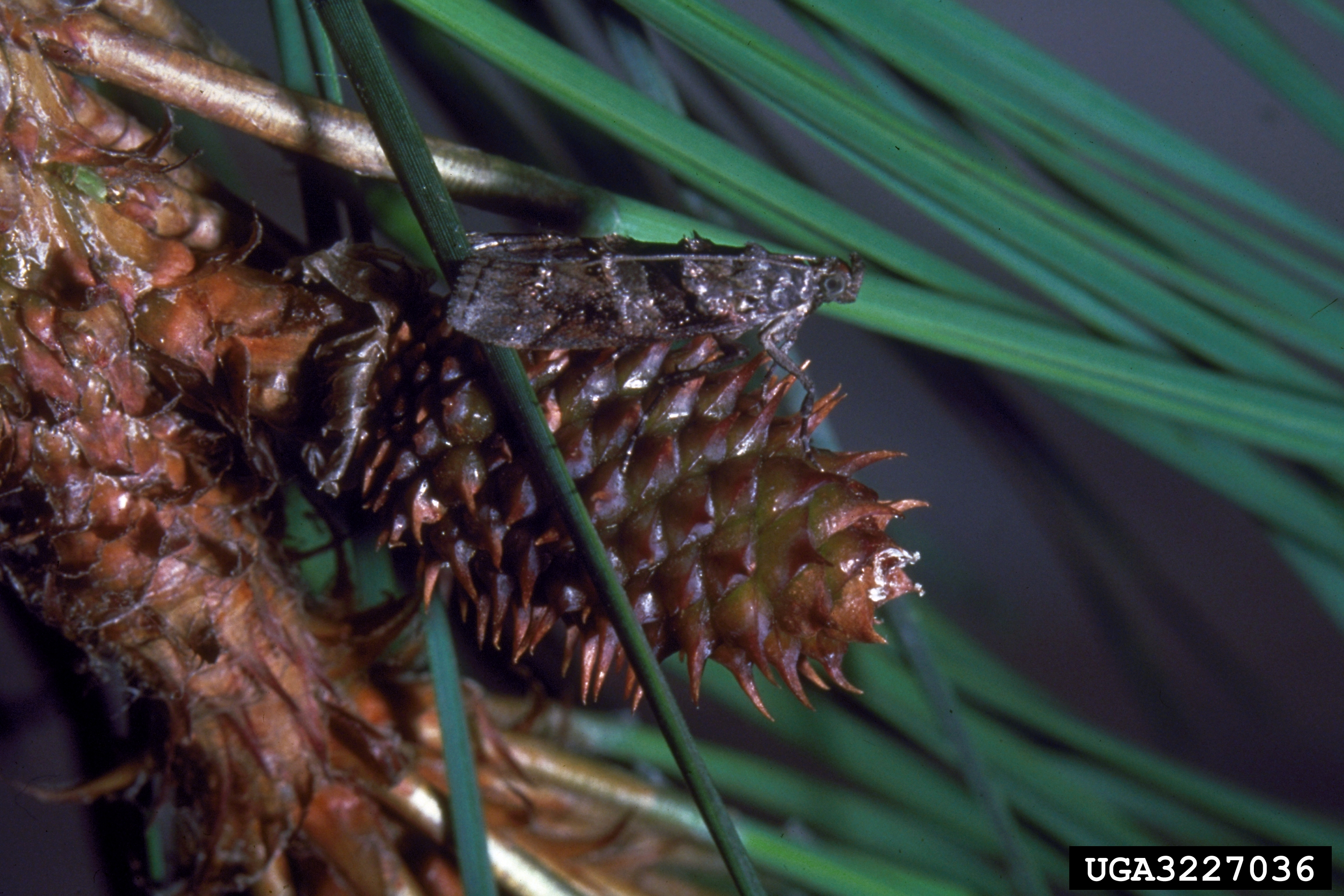
Adult
