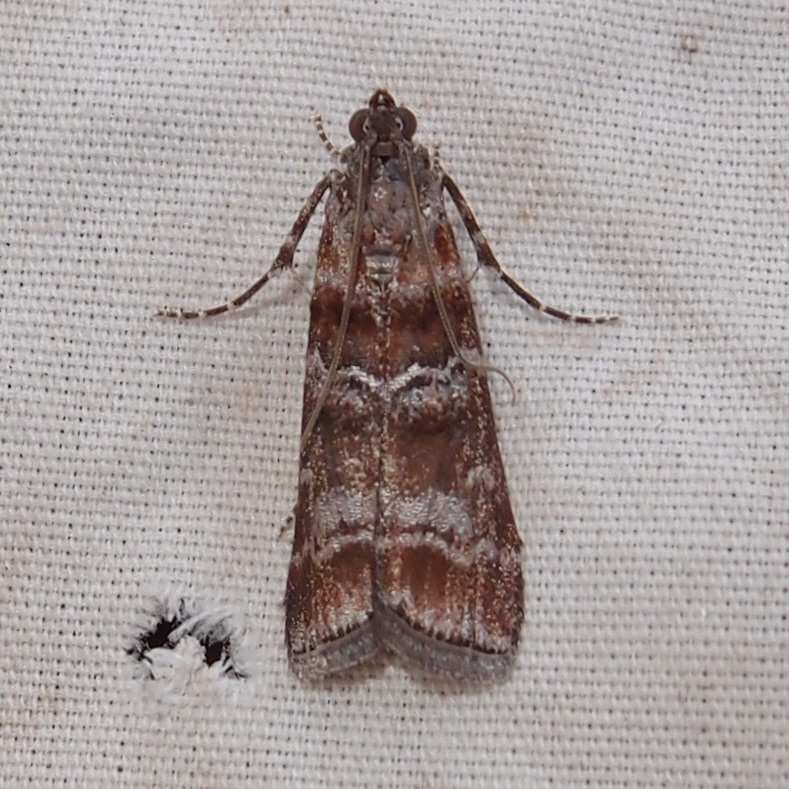

Scientific classification
- Kingdom: Animalia
- Phylum: Arthropoda
- Class: Insecta
- Order: Lepidoptera
- Family: Pyralidae
- Genus: Dioryctria
- Species: D. cambiicola

Binomial name
- Dioryctria cambiicola (Dyar, 1914)

Synonyms
- Pinipestis cambiicola Dyar, 1914

= Dioryctria cambiicola =

Species of moth

Dioryctria cambiicola, the western pine moth, is a species of snout moth in the genus Dioryctria. It was described by Harrison Gray Dyar Jr. in 1914 and is found in North America from British Columbia and Alberta south to California and New Mexico.
