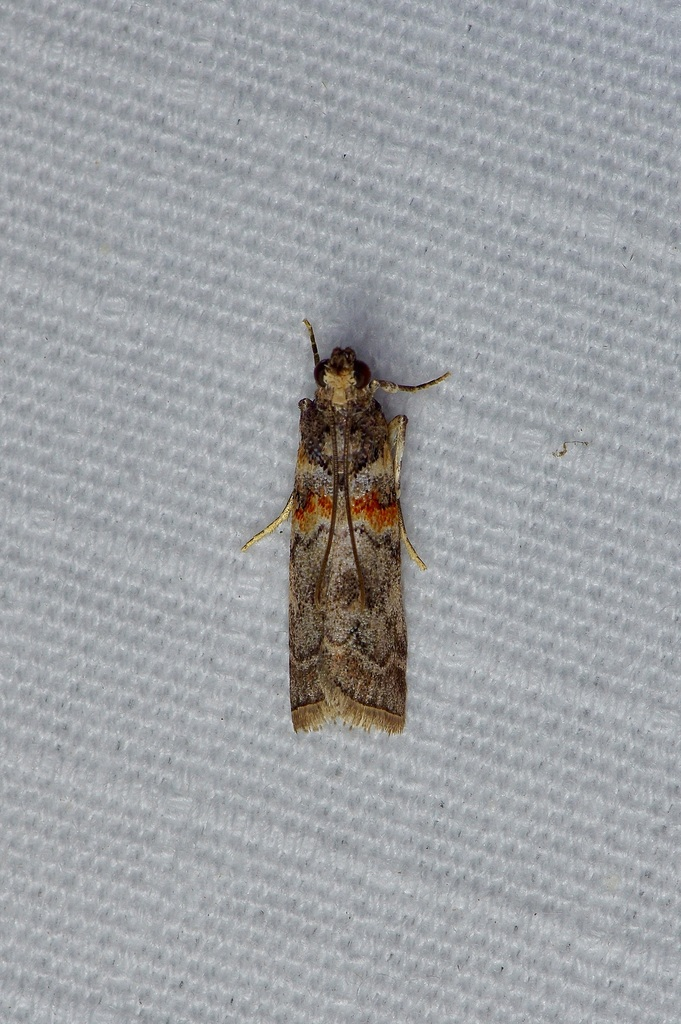

Scientific classification
- Domain: Eukaryota
- Kingdom: Animalia
- Phylum: Arthropoda
- Class: Insecta
- Order: Lepidoptera
- Family: Pyralidae
- Genus: Dioryctria
- Species: D. caesirufella

Binomial name
- Dioryctria caesirufella A. Blanchard & Knudson, 1983

= Dioryctria caesirufella =

Species of moth

Dioryctria caesirufella is a species of snout moth in the genus Dioryctria. It was described by André Blanchard and Edward C. Knudson in 1983 and is known from the US state of Texas.

The length of the forewings is 7.2–10.4 mm for males and 8.3–10.5 mm for females. The forewings have a bluish-grey groundcolour with reddish dusting. The hindwings are ochreous grey and darker along the outer margin.

The larvae possibly feed on Taxodium distichum.
