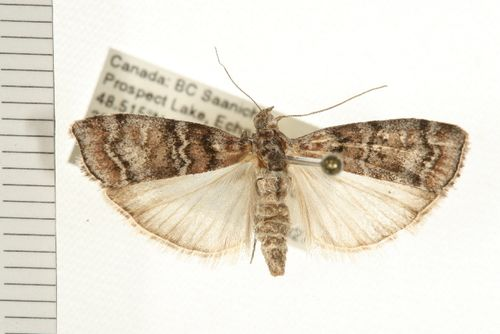

Scientific classification
- Domain: Eukaryota
- Kingdom: Animalia
- Phylum: Arthropoda
- Class: Insecta
- Order: Lepidoptera
- Family: Pyralidae
- Genus: Dioryctria
- Species: D. baumhoferi

Binomial name
- Dioryctria baumhoferi Heinrich, 1956

= Dioryctria baumhoferi =

Species of moth

Dioryctria baumhoferi is a species of snout moth in the genus Dioryctria. It was described by Carl Heinrich in 1956, and is known from the US states of Arizona and California.

The larvae feed on the twigs of Pinus ponderosa.
