= Dioryctria fanjingshana =

Scientific classification
- Domain: Eukaryota
- Kingdom: Animalia
- Phylum: Arthropoda
- Class: Insecta
- Order: Lepidoptera
- Family: Pyralidae
- Genus: Dioryctria
- Species: D. fanjingshana

Binomial name
- Dioryctria fanjingshana Li in Kuang & Li, 2009

Species of moth

Dioryctria fanjingshana is a species of snout moth in the genus Dioryctria. It was described by H. Li in 2009. It is found in China.

The wingspan is 22–26 mm.
