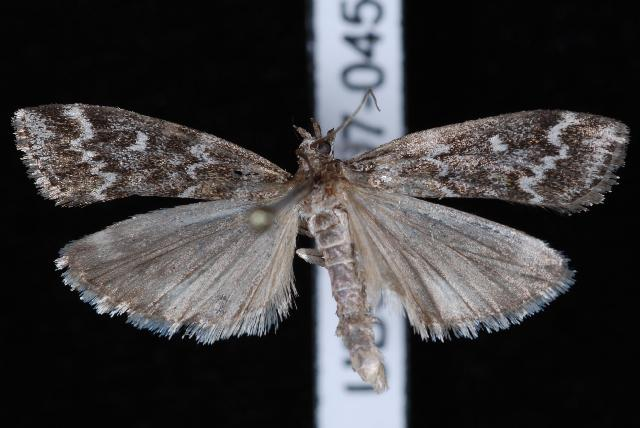

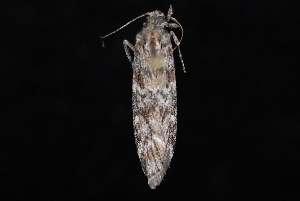

Scientific classification
- Kingdom: Animalia
- Phylum: Arthropoda
- Class: Insecta
- Order: Lepidoptera
- Family: Pyralidae
- Genus: Dioryctria
- Species: D. reniculelloides

Binomial name
- Dioryctria reniculelloides Mutuura & Munroe, 1973

= Dioryctria reniculelloides =

Species of moth

Dioryctria reniculelloides, the spruce coneworm, is a moth of the family Pyralidae. The species was first described by Akira Mutuura and Eugene G. Munroe in 1973. It is found from Nova Scotia to Alaska, south in the east to New York, and south in the west to California and New Mexico. It was recorded from China in 2009. Occasionally abundant, often in conjunction with epidemics of the spruce budworm, the spruce coneworm (Dioryctria reniculelloides Mutuura & Munroe) occurs through most or all of the range of spruce in North America, feeding on new foliage and cones of spruce, and often balsam fir (Ives & Wong 1988). When abundant, it can be a serious pest "particularly on white spruce" (Hedlin et al. 1980).

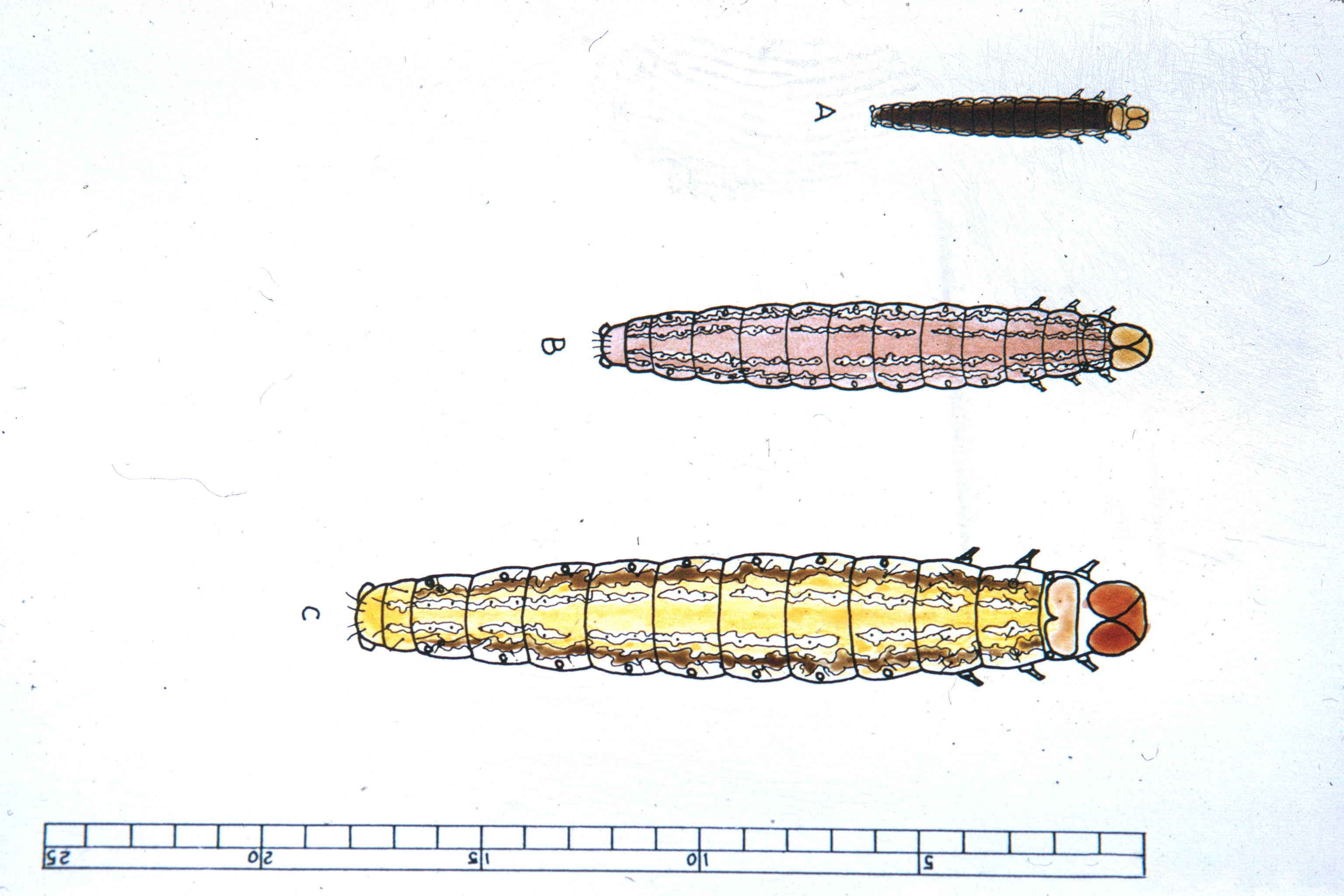
Larva

The wingspan is 9.5–11 mm. Adults are on wing from June to August in one generation per year.

The larvae feed on Picea, Pseudotsuga menziesii, Tsuga, Abies and Pinus contorta. Larvae of the spruce budworm sometimes cause superficial damage on cones, but their effect on the seed crop is minimal (Ives & Wong 1988), at least in central Canada. Capable of causing less than 10% of a seed crop, the larvae of the cone cochylid (Henricus fuscodorsana Kearfott) feed in the cones, damaging scales and seed (Hedlin et al. 1980). The species overwinters as a first-instar larva. Pupation takes place in late June and early July.
