= Dioryctria ebeli =

Scientific classification
- Domain: Eukaryota
- Kingdom: Animalia
- Phylum: Arthropoda
- Class: Insecta
- Order: Lepidoptera
- Family: Pyralidae
- Genus: Dioryctria
- Species: D. ebeli

Binomial name
- Dioryctria ebeli Mutuura & Munroe, 1979

Species of moth

Dioryctria ebeli, the south coastal coneworm moth, is a species of moth of the family Pyralidae. It is found in the US states of Florida, the southern parts of South Carolina, Georgia, Alabama, Massachusetts, and south-eastern Louisiana.

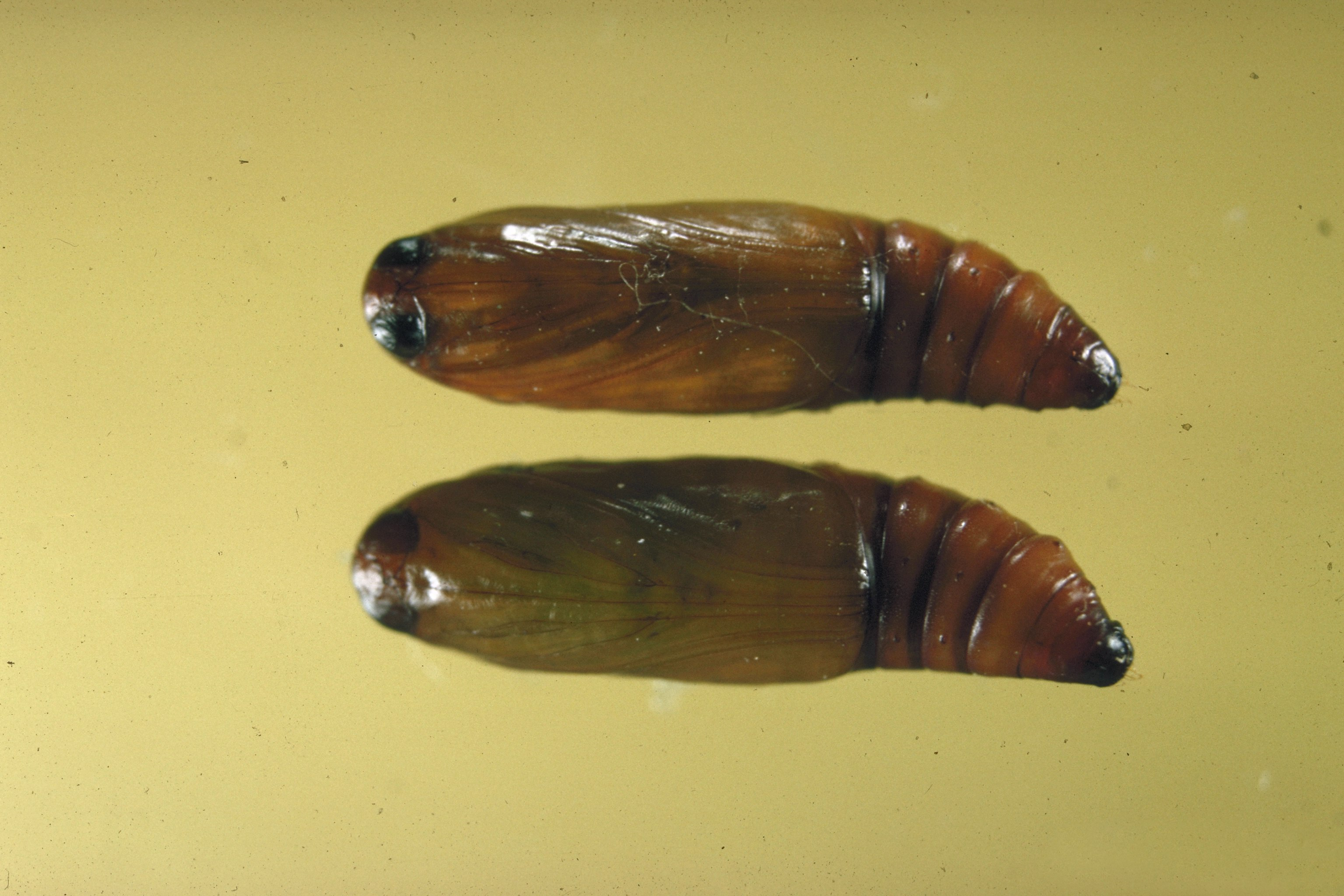
Pupa

The larvae feed on Pinus species.
