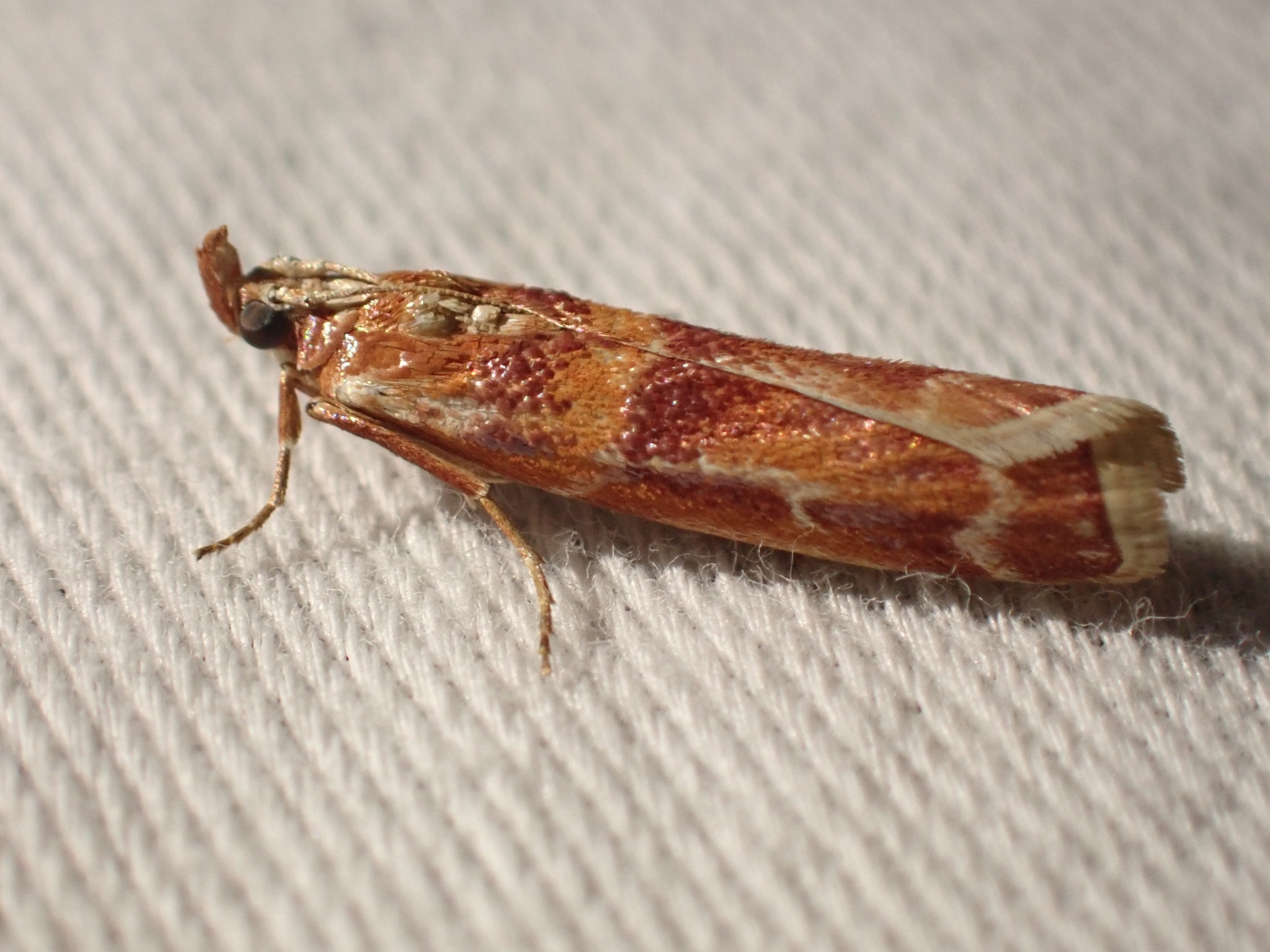

Scientific classification
- Domain: Eukaryota
- Kingdom: Animalia
- Phylum: Arthropoda
- Class: Insecta
- Order: Lepidoptera
- Family: Pyralidae
- Genus: Dioryctria
- Species: D. auranticella

Binomial name
- Dioryctria auranticella (Grote, 1883)

Synonyms
- Nephopteryx auranticella Grote, 1883; Dioryctria miniatella Ragonot, 1887; Dioryctria xanthoenobares Dyar, 1911

= Dioryctria auranticella =

Species of moth

Dioryctria auranticella, the ponderosa pineconeworm moth, is a moth of the family Pyralidae. The species was first described by Augustus Radcliffe Grote in 1883. It is found in western North America from southern British Columbia south to California and Arizona, east to South Dakota and New Mexico.

Its wingspan is 10.5–14 mm. Adults are on wing from mid-July to early August.

The larvae feed on Pinus ponderosa and Pinus attenuata. They generally feed in the cones of their host plant, but occasionally feed on the twigs.

== Gallery ==
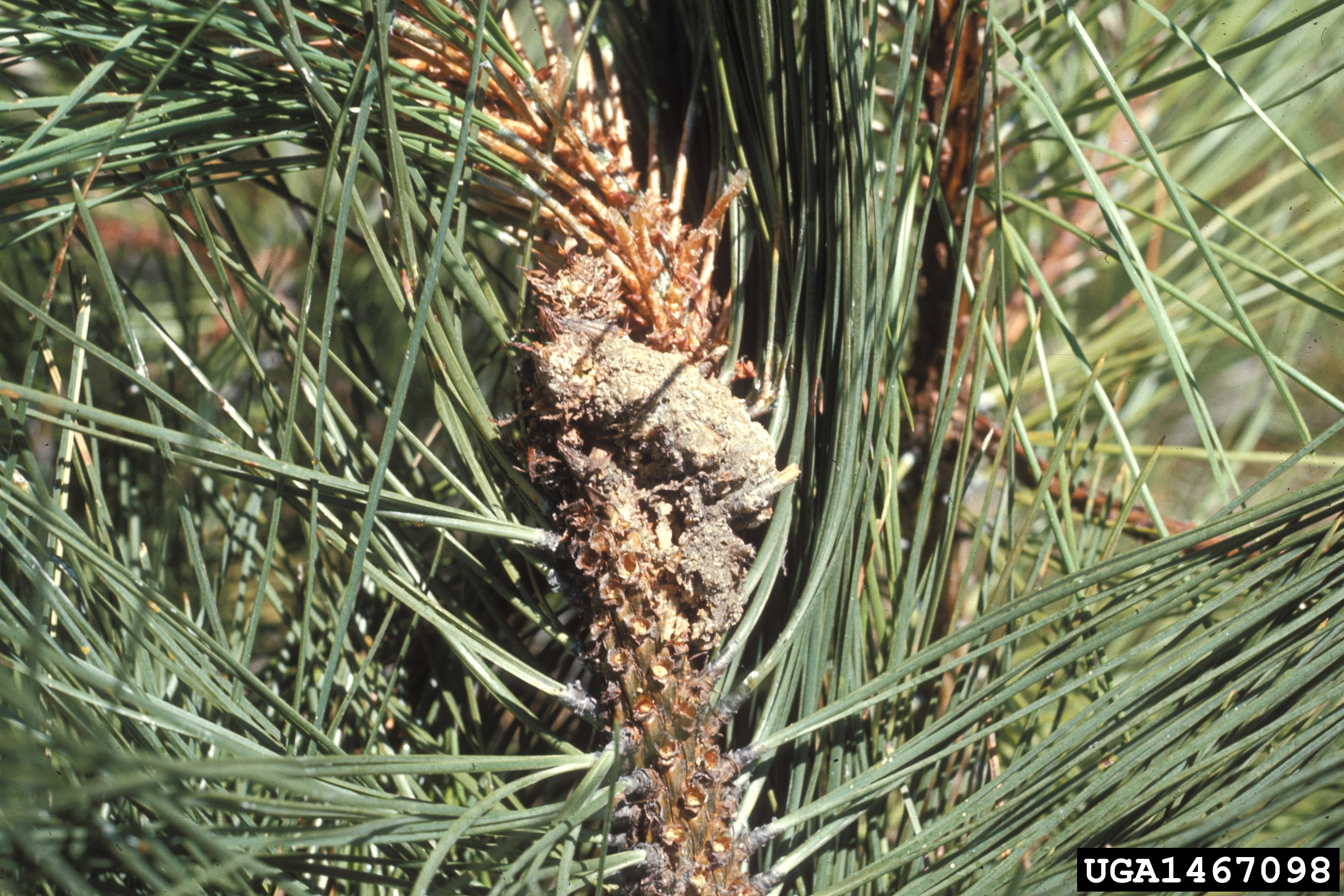
Damage

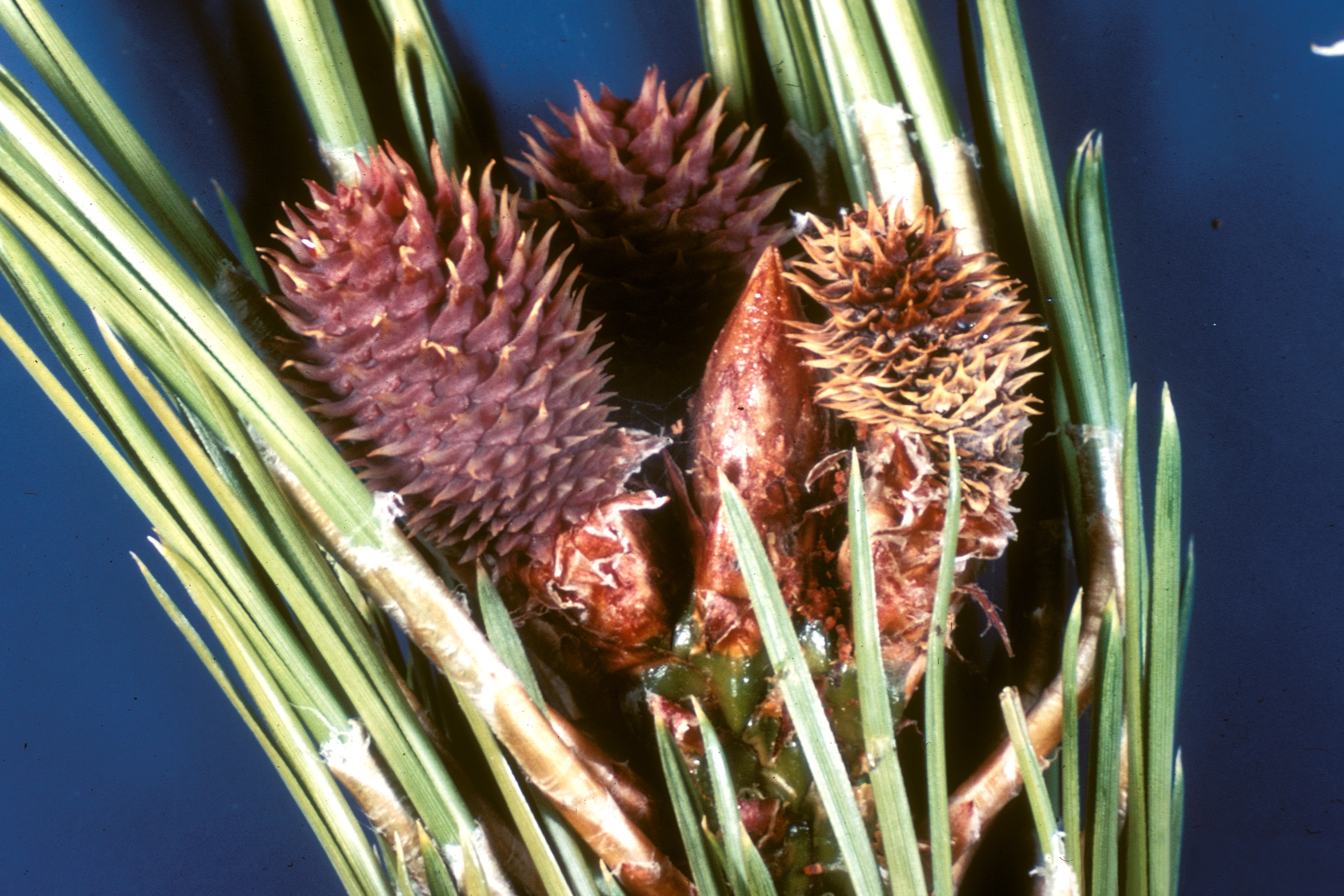
Damage
