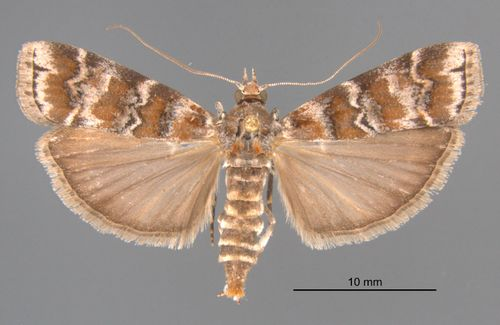

Scientific classification
- Domain: Eukaryota
- Kingdom: Animalia
- Phylum: Arthropoda
- Class: Insecta
- Order: Lepidoptera
- Family: Pyralidae
- Genus: Dioryctria
- Species: D. merkeli

Binomial name
- Dioryctria merkeli Mutuura & Munroe, 1979

= Dioryctria merkeli =

Species of moth

Dioryctria merkeli, the loblolly pine coneworm moth, is a species of snout moth in the genus Dioryctria. It was described by Akira Mutuura and Eugene G. Munroe in 1979 and is found in the eastern United States including Maryland, Texas, Mississippi, Georgia and Florida.

The larvae feed on Pinus species. They bore into the cambium of the trunk, branches and twigs of their host plant.
