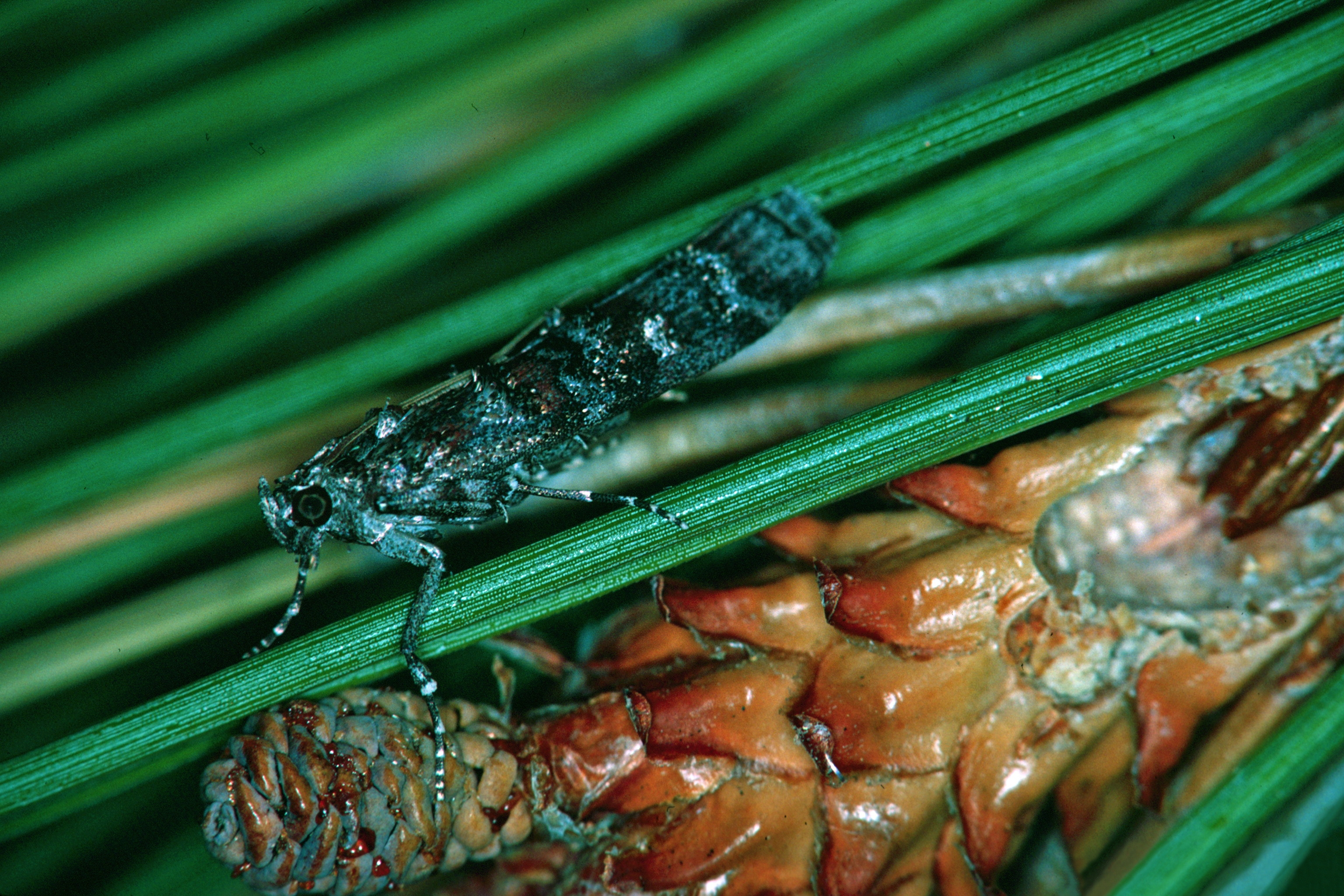

Scientific classification
- Kingdom: Animalia
- Phylum: Arthropoda
- Clade: Pancrustacea
- Class: Insecta
- Order: Lepidoptera
- Family: Pyralidae
- Genus: Dioryctria
- Species: D. resinosella

Binomial name
- Dioryctria resinosella Mutuura, 1982

= Dioryctria resinosella =

Species of moth

Dioryctria resinosella, the red pine shoot moth, is a species of moth of the family Pyralidae described by Akira Mutuura in 1982. It is found in Ontario and the northern United States.

The larvae feed on Pinus resinosa. They infest new shoots and cones of their host plant.

== Gallery ==
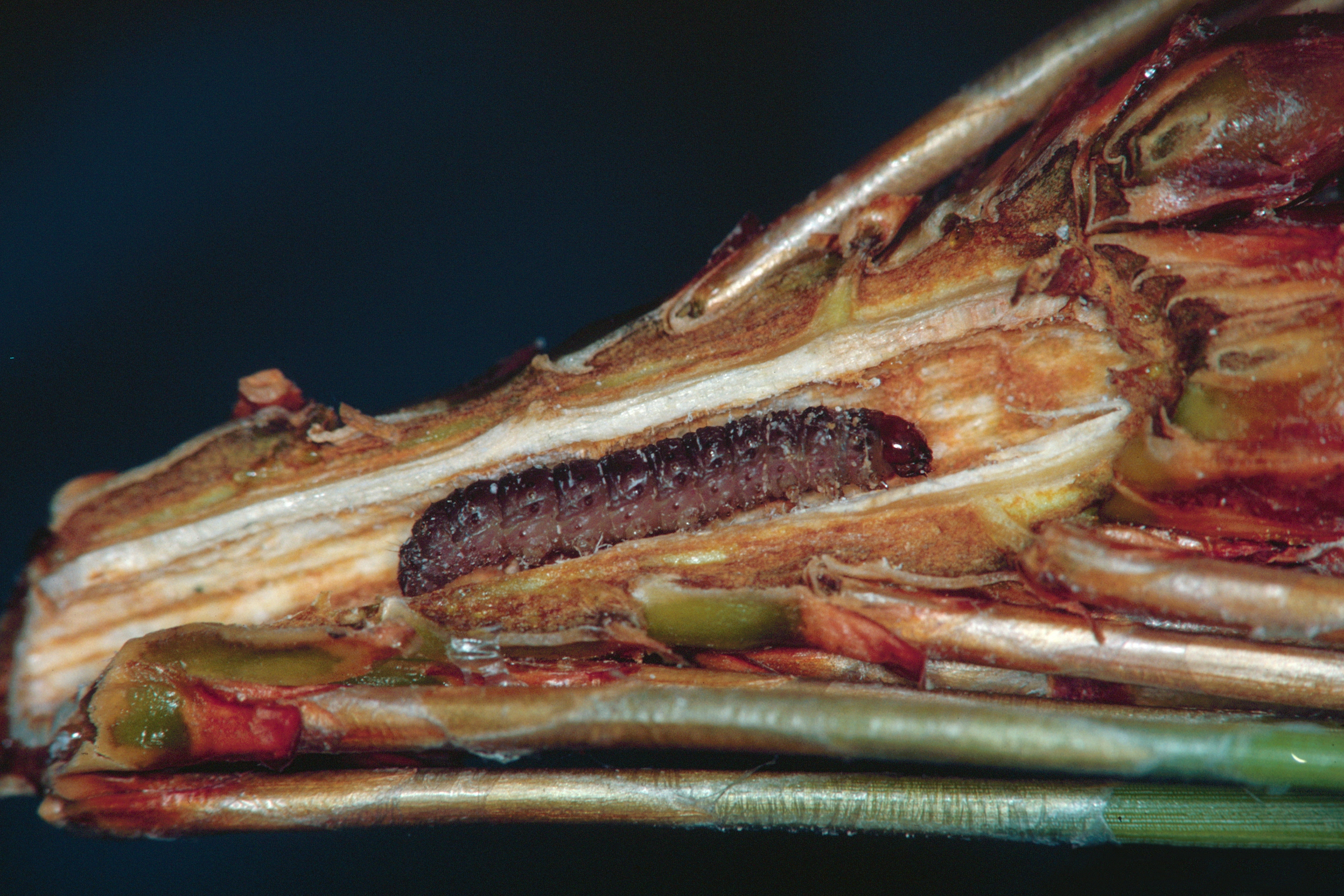
Larva

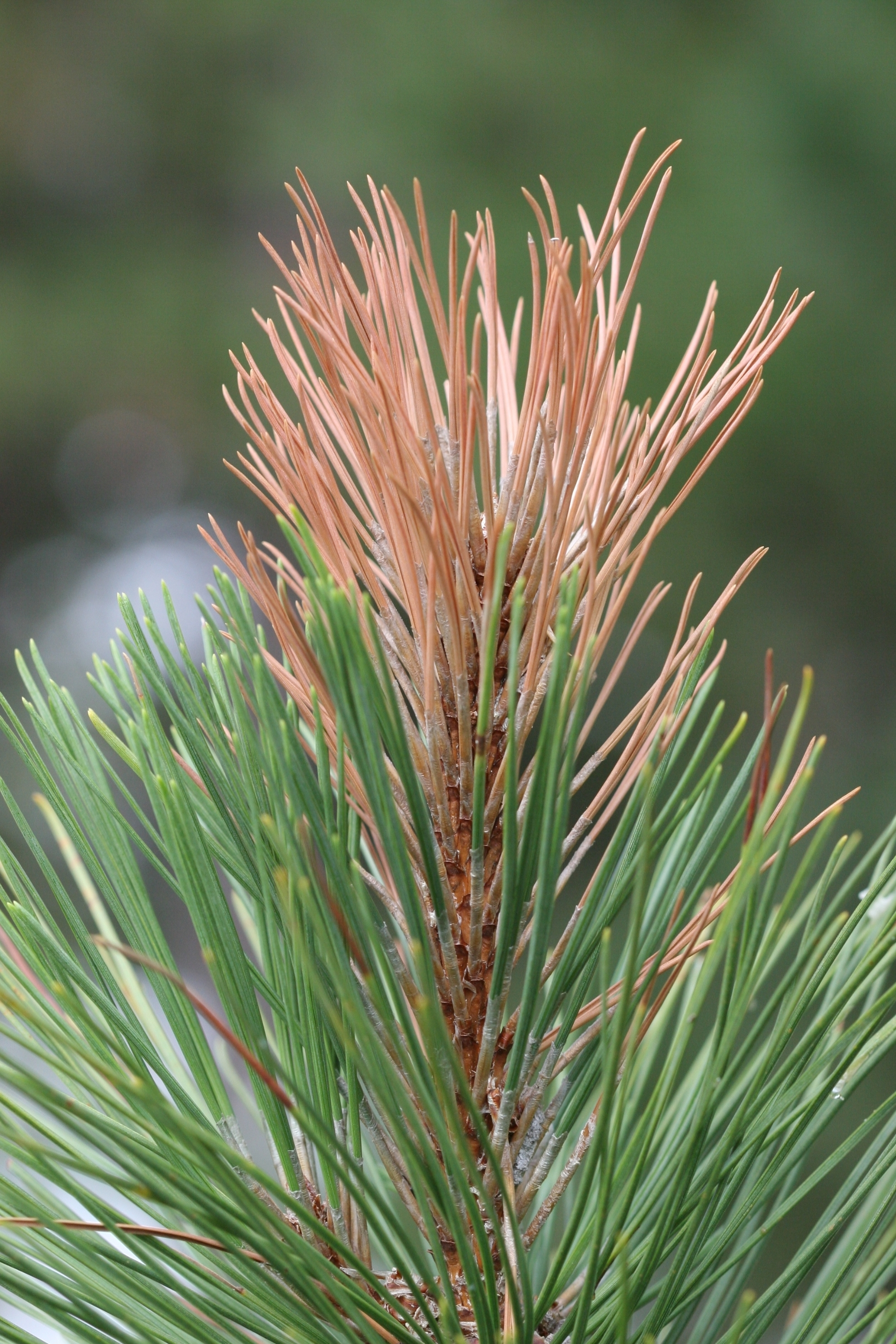
Damage

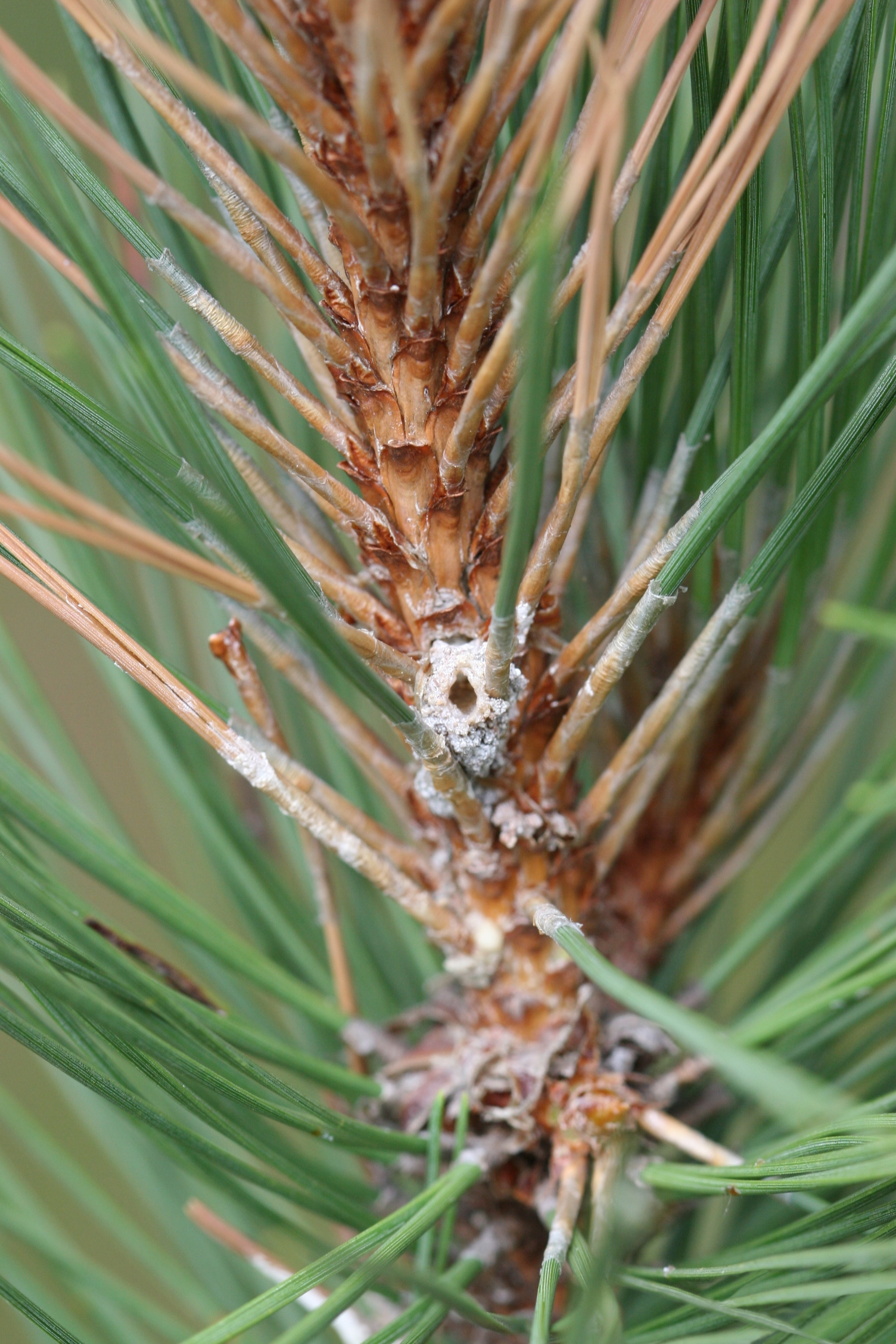
Pitch tube

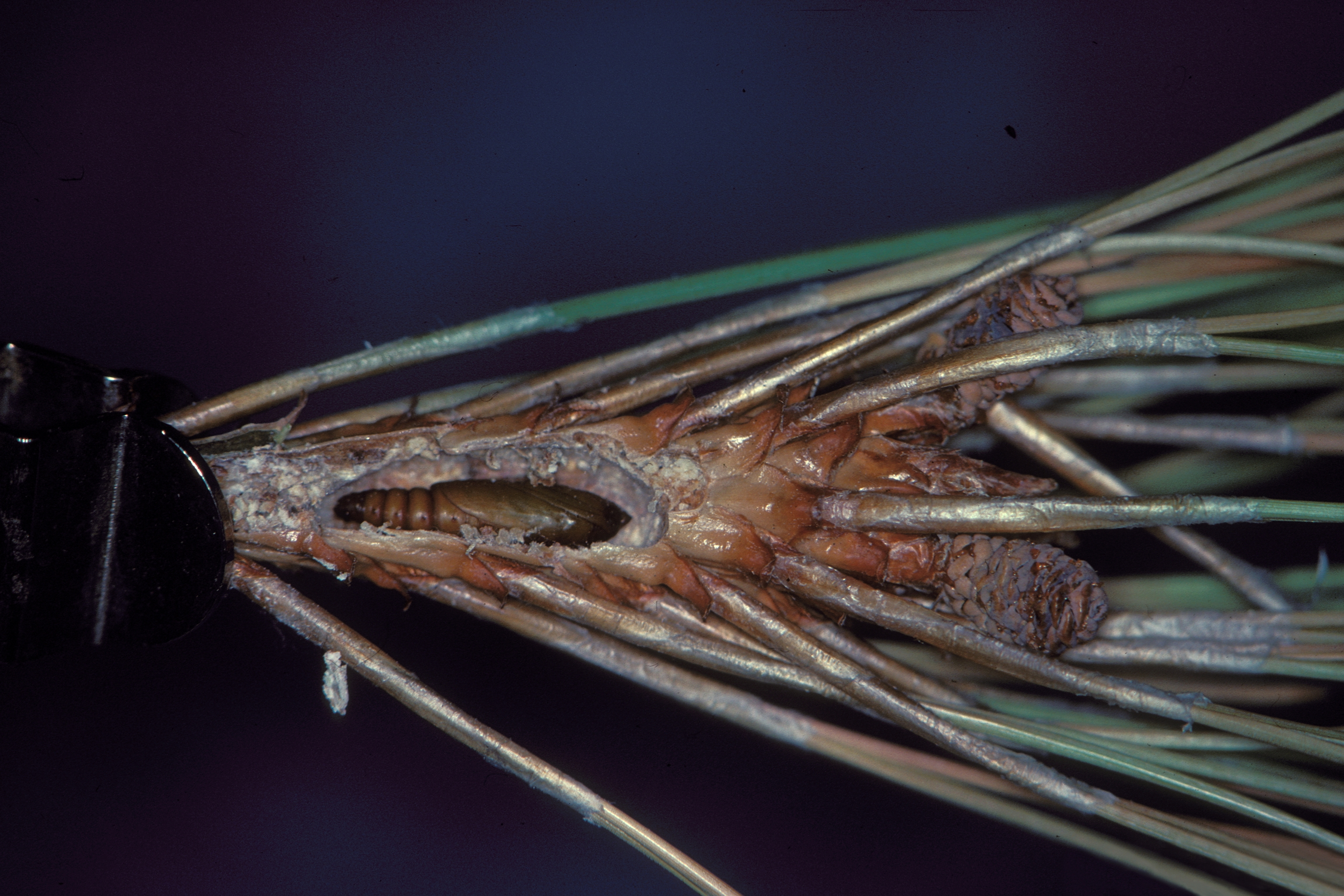
Pupa
