= Dioryctria batesella =

Scientific classification
- Domain: Eukaryota
- Kingdom: Animalia
- Phylum: Arthropoda
- Class: Insecta
- Order: Lepidoptera
- Family: Pyralidae
- Genus: Dioryctria
- Species: D. batesella

Binomial name
- Dioryctria batesella Mutuura & Neunzig, 1986

Species of moth

Dioryctria batesella is a species of snout moth belonging to the genus of Dioryctria. It was described by Akira Mutuura and Herbert H. Neunzig in 1986 and is known from Guatemala, Nicaragua and Honduras.

The length of the forewings is 11–14 mm. The ground color is reddish-brown. The hindwings are smoky coloured and darker toward the termen.

The larvae feed in the cones of Pinus oocarpa and Pinus caribae.
