= Dioryctria tumicolella =

Scientific classification
- Domain: Eukaryota
- Kingdom: Animalia
- Phylum: Arthropoda
- Class: Insecta
- Order: Lepidoptera
- Family: Pyralidae
- Genus: Dioryctria
- Species: D. tumicolella

Binomial name
- Dioryctria tumicolella Mutuura, Munroe & Ross, 1969

Species of moth

Dioryctria tumicolella is a species of snout moth in the genus Dioryctria. It was described by Akira Mutuura, Eugene G. Munroe and Douglas Alexander Ross in 1969, and is known from British Columbia, Canada, but is possibly present in all of north-western North America.

The wingspan is 12.5–15 mm.

The larvae have been recorded feeding within blister rust (Peridermium) swellings on Pinus ponderosa.
