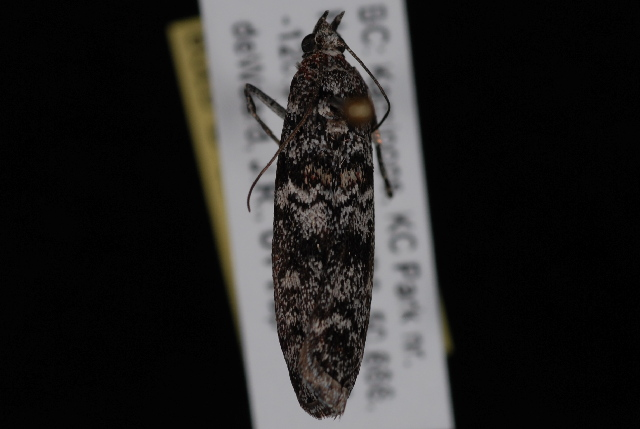

Scientific classification
- Domain: Eukaryota
- Kingdom: Animalia
- Phylum: Arthropoda
- Class: Insecta
- Order: Lepidoptera
- Family: Pyralidae
- Genus: Dioryctria
- Species: D. abietivorella

Binomial name
- Dioryctria abietivorella (Grote, 1878)

Synonyms
- Pinipestis abietivorella Grote, 1878; Myelois elegantella Hulst, 1892; Pinipestis reniculella Grote, 1880

= Dioryctria abietivorella =

Species of moth

Dioryctria abietivorella, the fir coneworm, is a species of snout moth in the genus Dioryctria. It was described by Augustus Radcliffe Grote in 1878, and is found in North America from southern Canada south to California in the west and North Carolina in the east.
