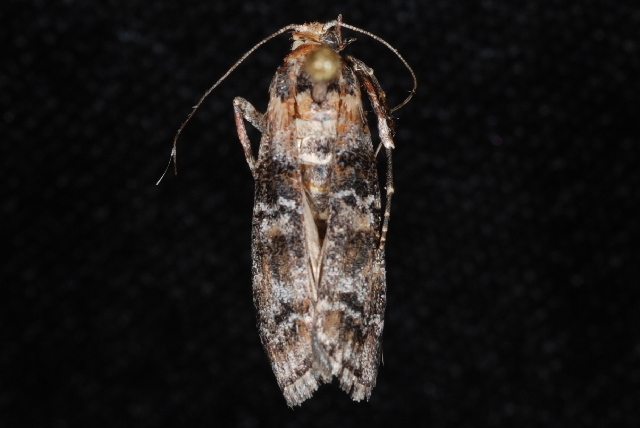

Scientific classification
- Domain: Eukaryota
- Kingdom: Animalia
- Phylum: Arthropoda
- Class: Insecta
- Order: Lepidoptera
- Family: Pyralidae
- Genus: Dioryctria
- Species: D. okanaganella

Binomial name
- Dioryctria okanaganella Mutuura, Munroe & Ross, 1969

= Dioryctria okanaganella =

Species of moth

Dioryctria okanaganella is a species of snout moth in the genus Dioryctria. It was described by Akira Mutuura, Eugene G. Munroe and Douglas Alexander Ross in 1969. It is found in western North America from southern British Columbia to northern California.
