= Dioryctria castanea =

Scientific classification
- Domain: Eukaryota
- Kingdom: Animalia
- Phylum: Arthropoda
- Class: Insecta
- Order: Lepidoptera
- Family: Pyralidae
- Genus: Dioryctria
- Species: D. castanea

Binomial name
- Dioryctria castanea Bradley, 1969

Species of moth

Dioryctria castanea is a species of snout moth in the genus Dioryctria. It was described by John David Bradley in 1969 and is known from India.

Adults have a distinctive purplish or reddish chestnut brown coloration of the forewings.

Larvae have been reared on Pinus kesiya.
