= Dioryctria aulloi =

Scientific classification
- Kingdom: Animalia
- Phylum: Arthropoda
- Class: Insecta
- Order: Lepidoptera
- Family: Pyralidae
- Genus: Dioryctria
- Species: D. aulloi

Binomial name
- Dioryctria aulloi Barbey, 1930

Species of moth

Dioryctria aulloi is a species of snout moth in the genus Dioryctria. It was described by Barbey in 1930, and is known from Spain and India. It was recorded from China in 2009.

The wingspan is 26.5-31.5 mm.

The larvae feed on Abies pinsapo, boring tunnels in and overwintering in twigs. They often migrate between twigs.
