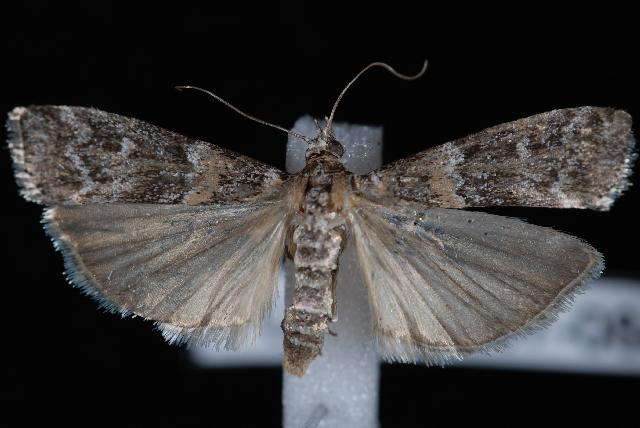

Scientific classification
- Domain: Eukaryota
- Kingdom: Animalia
- Phylum: Arthropoda
- Class: Insecta
- Order: Lepidoptera
- Family: Pyralidae
- Genus: Dioryctria
- Species: D. pseudotsugella

Binomial name
- Dioryctria pseudotsugella Munroe, 1959

= Dioryctria pseudotsugella =

Species of moth

Dioryctria pseudotsugella is a species of snout moth in the genus Dioryctria. It was described by Eugene G. Munroe in 1959, and is known from southern British Columbia and Alberta and south to New Mexico.

The wingspan is 10–11 mm.

The larvae feed on Pseudotsuga menziesii, Picea, Abies and Tsuga species. They mainly feed on the cones and cambium of their host plant, but have also been observed on needles.
