= Dioryctria contortella =

Scientific classification
- Kingdom: Animalia
- Phylum: Arthropoda
- Clade: Pancrustacea
- Class: Insecta
- Order: Lepidoptera
- Family: Pyralidae
- Genus: Dioryctria
- Species: D. contortella

Binomial name
- Dioryctria contortella Mutuura, Munroe & Ross, 1969

Species of moth

Dioryctria contortella is a species of snout moth in the genus Dioryctria. It was described by Akira Mutuura, Eugene G. Munroe and Douglas Alexander Ross in 1969, and is known in North America from British Columbia, Alberta and Washington.

Adults have black and white forewings with a reddish-brown basal area.

The larvae bore galleries in blister rust swellings caused by Peridermium species on Pinus contorta.
