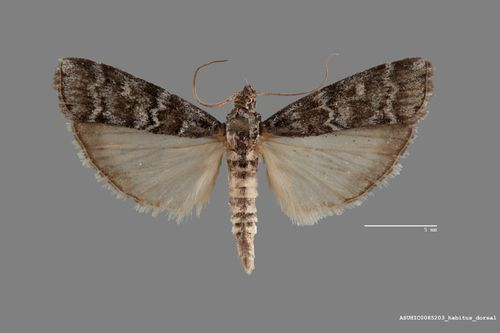

Scientific classification
- Domain: Eukaryota
- Kingdom: Animalia
- Phylum: Arthropoda
- Class: Insecta
- Order: Lepidoptera
- Family: Pyralidae
- Genus: Dioryctria
- Species: D. yatesi

Binomial name
- Dioryctria yatesi Mutuura & Munroe, 1979

= Dioryctria yatesi =

Species of moth

Dioryctria yatesi, the mountain pine coneworm, is a species of snout moth in the genus Dioryctria. It was described by Akira Mutuura and Eugene G. Munroe in 1979 and is limited to the mountains of the coastal south-eastern United States and Tennessee.

The larvae feed on Pinus pungens. They bore the cones of their host plant.
