= Dioryctria peltieri =

Scientific classification
- Domain: Eukaryota
- Kingdom: Animalia
- Phylum: Arthropoda
- Class: Insecta
- Order: Lepidoptera
- Family: Pyralidae
- Genus: Dioryctria
- Species: D. peltieri

Binomial name
- Dioryctria peltieri de Joannis, 1908

Species of moth

Dioryctria peltieri is a species of snout moth in the genus Dioryctria. It was described by Joseph de Joannis in 1908 and is known from Algeria.

The larvae feed on the cones of Cedrus atlantica species.
