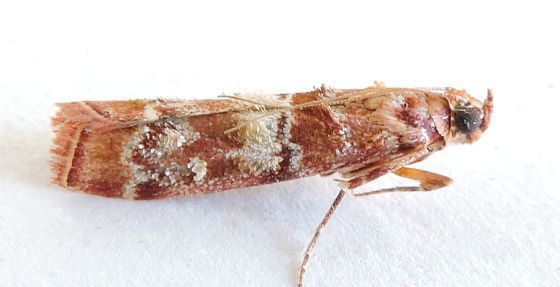

Scientific classification
- Domain: Eukaryota
- Kingdom: Animalia
- Phylum: Arthropoda
- Class: Insecta
- Order: Lepidoptera
- Family: Pyralidae
- Genus: Dioryctria
- Species: D. erythropasa

Binomial name
- Dioryctria erythropasa (Dyar, 1914)

Synonyms
- Pinipestis erythropasa Dyar, 1914

= Dioryctria erythropasa =

Species of moth

Dioryctria erythropasa is a species of snout moth in the genus Dioryctria. It was described by Harrison Gray Dyar Jr. in 1914 and is found from Arizona south along the Mexican Pacific coast to Central America.

The wingspan is 23–32 mm.
