= Dioryctria dominguensis =

Scientific classification
- Domain: Eukaryota
- Kingdom: Animalia
- Phylum: Arthropoda
- Class: Insecta
- Order: Lepidoptera
- Family: Pyralidae
- Genus: Dioryctria
- Species: D. dominguensis

Binomial name
- Dioryctria dominguensis Neunzig, 1996

Species of moth

Dioryctria dominguensis is a species of snout moth in the genus Dioryctria. It was described by Herbert H. Neunzig in 1996 and is known from the Dominican Republic.
