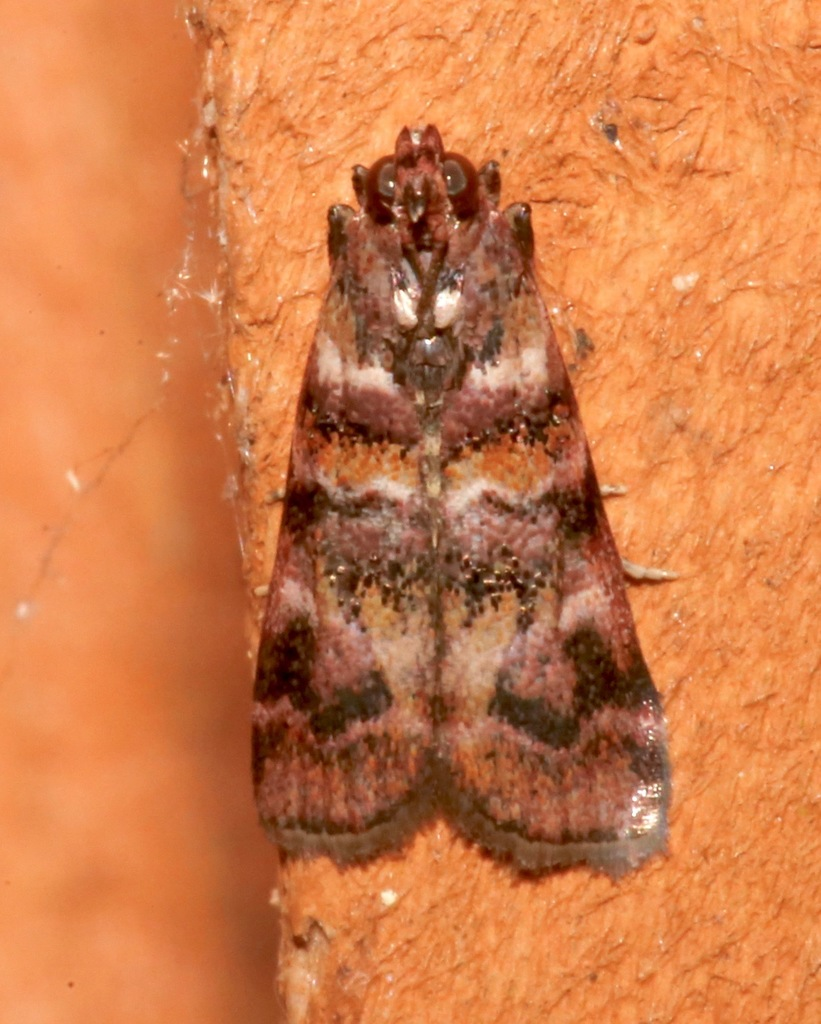

Scientific classification
- Kingdom: Animalia
- Phylum: Arthropoda
- Class: Insecta
- Order: Lepidoptera
- Family: Pyralidae
- Genus: Dioryctria
- Species: D. pygmaeella

Binomial name
- Dioryctria pygmaeella Ragonot, 1887

= Dioryctria pygmaeella =

Species of moth

Dioryctria pygmaeella, the baldcypress coneworm moth, is a species of snout moth. It was described by Émile Louis Ragonot in 1887 and is restricted to the coastal plains of the eastern United States and eastern Texas.

There are up to three generations per year.

The larvae feed within the cones of Taxodium distichum and Taxodium ascendens.
