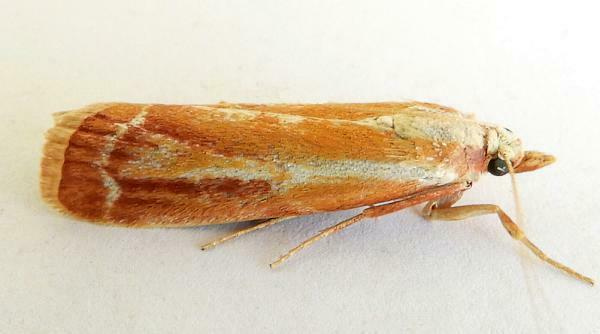

Scientific classification
- Domain: Eukaryota
- Kingdom: Animalia
- Phylum: Arthropoda
- Class: Insecta
- Order: Lepidoptera
- Family: Pyralidae
- Genus: Dioryctria
- Species: D. rossi

Binomial name
- Dioryctria rossi Munroe, 1959

= Dioryctria rossi =

Species of insect

Dioryctria rossi is a species of snout moth in the genus Dioryctria. This moth was discovered and named by Douglas Alexander Ross, chief entomologist at the Vernon forest entomology laboratory and research centre in Vernon, British Columbia, from 1950 to 1970. It was described by Eugene G. Munroe in 1959. It is found in western North America, from southern British Columbia to northern Mexico and east to New Mexico.

The wingspan is 22–34 mm.

The larvae feed on Pinus ponderosa, Pinus arizonica and Pinus durangensis. They feed in the cones of their host plant.
