= Dioryctria peyerimhoffi =

Scientific classification
- Domain: Eukaryota
- Kingdom: Animalia
- Phylum: Arthropoda
- Class: Insecta
- Order: Lepidoptera
- Family: Pyralidae
- Genus: Dioryctria
- Species: D. peyerimhoffi

Binomial name
- Dioryctria peyerimhoffi de Joannis, 1921

Species of moth

Dioryctria peyerimhoffi is a species of snout moth in the genus Dioryctria. It was described by Joseph de Joannis in 1921 and is known from Algeria and Morocco.

The larvae feed on Cedrus atlantica. They mine the young cones of their host plant.
