= Dioryctria vancouverella =

Scientific classification
- Domain: Eukaryota
- Kingdom: Animalia
- Phylum: Arthropoda
- Class: Insecta
- Order: Lepidoptera
- Family: Pyralidae
- Genus: Dioryctria
- Species: D. vancouverella

Binomial name
- Dioryctria vancouverella Mutuura, Munroe & Ross, 1969

Species of moth

Dioryctria vancouverella is a species of snout moth in the genus Dioryctria. It was described by Akira Mutuura, Eugene G. Munroe and Douglas Alexander Ross in 1969, and is known from southern British Columbia, Canada. It is named for the city of Vancouver, from which the type specimen was collected.
