= Dioryctria postmajorella =

Scientific classification
- Domain: Eukaryota
- Kingdom: Animalia
- Phylum: Arthropoda
- Class: Insecta
- Order: Lepidoptera
- Family: Pyralidae
- Genus: Dioryctria
- Species: D. postmajorella

Binomial name
- Dioryctria postmajorella Neunzig, 1996

Species of moth

Dioryctria postmajorella is a species of snout moth in the genus Dioryctria. It was described by Herbert H. Neunzig in 1996 and is known from the Dominican Republic.

The length of the forewings is 12–15 mm.

The larvae possibly feed on Pinus occidentalis.
