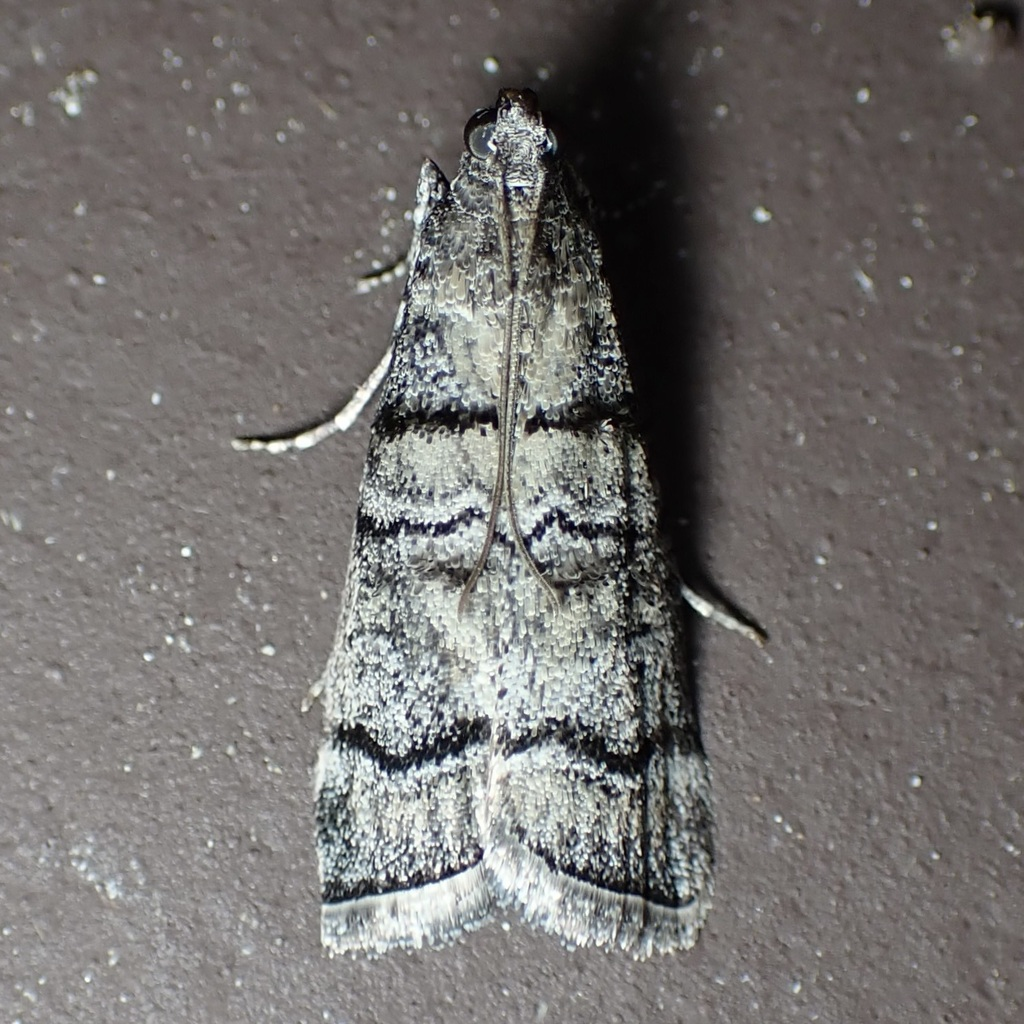

Scientific classification
- Domain: Eukaryota
- Kingdom: Animalia
- Phylum: Arthropoda
- Class: Insecta
- Order: Lepidoptera
- Family: Pyralidae
- Genus: Dioryctria
- Species: D. subtracta

Binomial name
- Dioryctria subtracta Heinrich, 1956

= Dioryctria subtracta =

Species of moth

Dioryctria subtracta is a species of snout moth in the genus Dioryctria. It was described by Carl Heinrich in 1956 and is known from the US state of New Mexico.

The wingspan is 23–25 mm. The forewings are dark gray, finely peppered with white making the ground color appear dark ash gray. The hindwings are white, with a faint smoky tint towards the apex in females.
