= Dioryctria yiai =

Scientific classification
- Domain: Eukaryota
- Kingdom: Animalia
- Phylum: Arthropoda
- Class: Insecta
- Order: Lepidoptera
- Family: Pyralidae
- Genus: Dioryctria
- Species: D. yiai

Binomial name
- Dioryctria yiai Mutuura & Munroe, 1972

Species of moth

Dioryctria yiai is a species of snout moth in the genus Dioryctria. It was described by Akira Mutuura and Eugene G. Munroe in 1972 and is known from Taiwan and China.

There is one generation per year.

The larvae feed on Pinus massoniana. They damage the branches, cones and shoots of their host plant.
