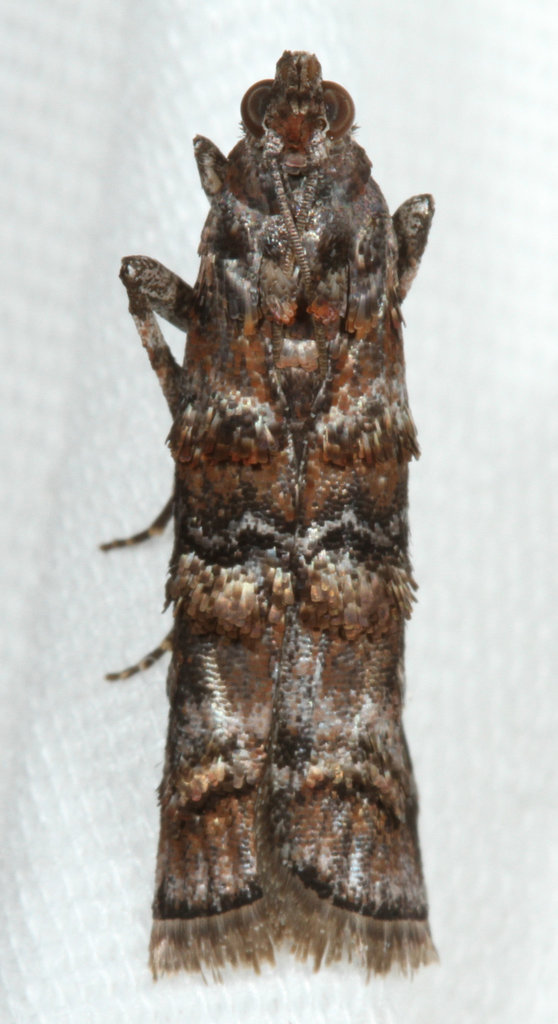

Scientific classification
- Domain: Eukaryota
- Kingdom: Animalia
- Phylum: Arthropoda
- Class: Insecta
- Order: Lepidoptera
- Family: Pyralidae
- Genus: Dioryctria
- Species: D. taedivorella

Binomial name
- Dioryctria taedivorella Neunzig & Leidy, 1989

= Dioryctria taedivorella =

Species of moth

Dioryctria taedivorella, the lesser loblolly pineconeworm moth, is a species of snout moth in the genus Dioryctria. It was described by Herbert H. Neunzig and Nancy Antoine Leidy in 1989, and is known from North America, where it is found from eastern Virginia and North Carolina to northern Alabama and Mississippi.

The larvae feed on Pinus taeda (loblolly pine).
