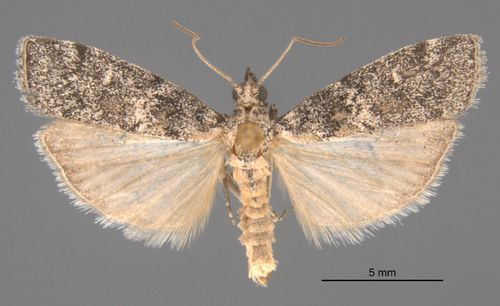

Scientific classification
- Domain: Eukaryota
- Kingdom: Animalia
- Phylum: Arthropoda
- Class: Insecta
- Order: Lepidoptera
- Family: Pyralidae
- Genus: Dioryctria
- Species: D. durangoensis

Binomial name
- Dioryctria durangoensis Mutuura & Neunzig, 1986

= Dioryctria durangoensis =

Species of moth

Dioryctria durangoensis is a species of snout moth in the genus Dioryctria. It was described by Akira Mutuura and Herbert H. Neunzig in 1986 and was described from Durango, Mexico, from which its species epithet is derived.
