= Dioryctria juniperella =

Scientific classification
- Domain: Eukaryota
- Kingdom: Animalia
- Phylum: Arthropoda
- Class: Insecta
- Order: Lepidoptera
- Family: Pyralidae
- Genus: Dioryctria
- Species: D. juniperella

Binomial name
- Dioryctria juniperella Yamanaka, 1990

Species of moth

Dioryctria juniperella is a species of snout moth in the genus Dioryctria. It was described by Hiroshi Yamanaka in 1990. It is found in Korea and Japan.

The wingspan is 19–20 mm.

The larvae feed on Juniperus species, including Juniperus chinensis and Juniperus procumbens.
