= Dioryctria sysstratiotes =

Scientific classification
- Kingdom: Animalia
- Phylum: Arthropoda
- Class: Insecta
- Order: Lepidoptera
- Family: Pyralidae
- Genus: Dioryctria
- Species: D. sysstratiotes

Binomial name
- Dioryctria sysstratiotes Dyar, 1919

Species of moth

Dioryctria sysstratiotes is a species of snout moth in the genus Dioryctria. It was described by Harrison Gray Dyar Jr. in 1919 and is known from Guatemala.
