= Dioryctria delectella =

Scientific classification
- Domain: Eukaryota
- Kingdom: Animalia
- Phylum: Arthropoda
- Class: Insecta
- Order: Lepidoptera
- Family: Pyralidae
- Genus: Dioryctria
- Species: D. delectella

Binomial name
- Dioryctria delectella (Hulst, 1895)

Synonyms
- Salebria delectella Hulst, 1895

Species of moth

Dioryctria delectella is a species of snout moth in the genus Dioryctria. It was described by George Duryea Hulst in 1895. It is found in North America, including Oregon and Washington.
