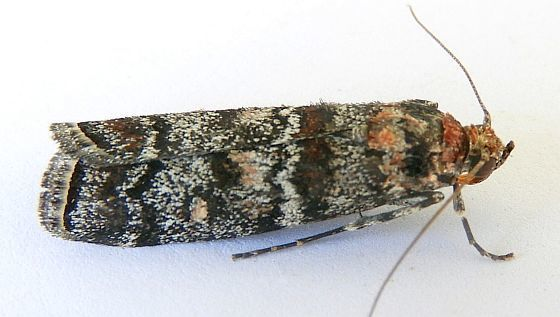

Scientific classification
- Domain: Eukaryota
- Kingdom: Animalia
- Phylum: Arthropoda
- Class: Insecta
- Order: Lepidoptera
- Family: Pyralidae
- Genus: Dioryctria
- Species: D. pentictonella

Binomial name
- Dioryctria pentictonella Mutuura, Munroe & Ross, 1969

= Dioryctria pentictonella =

Species of moth

Dioryctria pentictonella is a species of snout moth in the genus Dioryctria. It was described by Akira Mutuura, Eugene G. Munroe and Douglas Alexander Ross in 1969 and is found in North America from British Columbia south to California.

Adults are on wing from mid-April to early June.

The larvae feed on Pinus ponderosa and Pinus contorta. They feed on the buds of their host plant.
