= Dioryctria adamsi =

Scientific classification
- Domain: Eukaryota
- Kingdom: Animalia
- Phylum: Arthropoda
- Class: Insecta
- Order: Lepidoptera
- Family: Pyralidae
- Genus: Dioryctria
- Species: D. adamsi

Binomial name
- Dioryctria adamsi Neunzig & Dow, 1993

Species of moth

Dioryctria adamsi is a species of snout moth in the genus Dioryctria. It was described by Herbert H. Neunzig and L. C. Dow in 1993 and is known from Belize.
