= Dioryctria assamensis =

Scientific classification
- Kingdom: Animalia
- Phylum: Arthropoda
- Class: Insecta
- Order: Lepidoptera
- Family: Pyralidae
- Genus: Dioryctria
- Species: D. assamensis

Binomial name
- Dioryctria assamensis Mutuura, 1971

Species of moth

Dioryctria assamensis is a species of snout moth. It was described by Akira Mutuura in 1971 and is known from Assam, India, from which its species epithet is derived.

The larvae feed on Pinus khasya. They bore in the shoots of their host plant.
