= Dioryctria pinicolella =

Scientific classification
- Domain: Eukaryota
- Kingdom: Animalia
- Phylum: Arthropoda
- Class: Insecta
- Order: Lepidoptera
- Family: Pyralidae
- Genus: Dioryctria
- Species: D. pinicolella

Binomial name
- Dioryctria pinicolella Amsel, 1962

Species of moth

Dioryctria pinicolella is a species of snout moth in the genus Dioryctria. It was described by Hans Georg Amsel in 1962 and is known from Central America, including Mexico and Guatemala.

The wingspan is 27–32 mm. The larvae feed on Abies religiosa, Pinus cembroides, Pinus hartwegii, Pinus leiophylla, Pinus montezumae, Pinus oocarpa, Pinus radiata, Pinus rudis, Pseudotsuga macrolepis.
