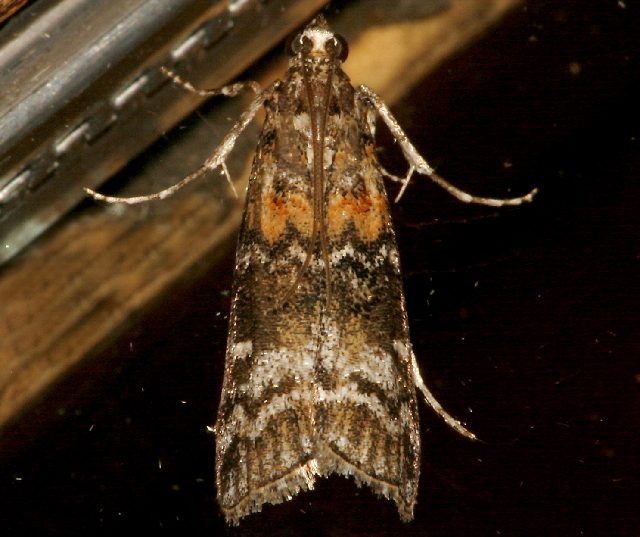

Scientific classification
- Kingdom: Animalia
- Phylum: Arthropoda
- Class: Insecta
- Order: Lepidoptera
- Family: Pyralidae
- Genus: Dioryctria
- Species: D. banksiella

Binomial name
- Dioryctria banksiella Mutuura, Munroe & Ross, 1969

= Dioryctria banksiella =

Species of moth

Dioryctria banksiella is a species of snout moth in the genus Dioryctria. It was described by Akira Mutuura, Eugene G. Munroe and Douglas Alexander Ross in 1969, and it is found in Canada from Alberta and the Northwest Territories eastward.

The larvae feed in western gall rust (Cronartium harknessii) on trunks of Pinus banksiana. Early instars score the gall tissue below the bark, while later instars mine the gall tissue.
