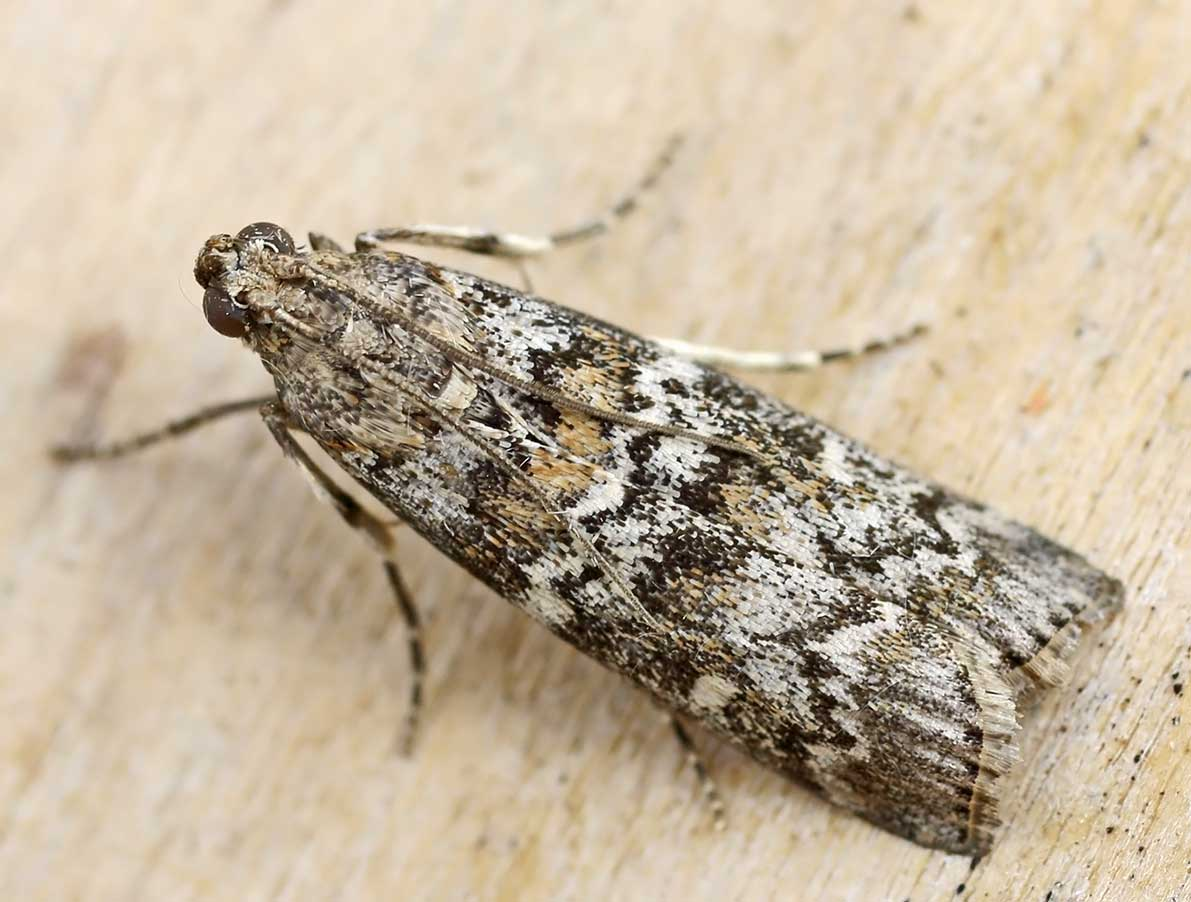
- Dioryctria abietella

Scientific classification
- Domain: Eukaryota
- Kingdom: Animalia
- Phylum: Arthropoda
- Class: Insecta
- Order: Lepidoptera
- Family: Pyralidae
- Tribe: Phycitini
- Genus: Dioryctria; Zeller, 1846

Synonyms
- Dioryctriodes Mutuura & Munroe, 1974; Ocrisia Ragonot, 1893; Pinipestis Grote, 1878

= Dioryctria =

Genus of moths

Dioryctria is a genus of snout moths. It was described by Philipp Christoph Zeller in 1846.

== Species ==
- Dioryctria abietella (Denis & Schiffermüller, 1775)
- Dioryctria abietivorella (Grote, 1878)
- Dioryctria adamsi Neunzig & Dow, 1993
- Dioryctria albovittella (Hulst, 1900)
- Dioryctria amatella (Hulst, 1887)
- Dioryctria assamensis Mutuura, 1971
- Dioryctria aulloi Barbey, 1930
- Dioryctria auranticella (Grote, 1883)
- Dioryctria banksiella Mutuura, Munroe & Ross, 1969
- Dioryctria batesella Mutuura & Neunzig, 1986
- Dioryctria baumhoferi Heinrich, 1956
- Dioryctria caesirufella Blanchard & Knudson, 1983
- Dioryctria cambiicola (Dyar, 1914)
- Dioryctria castanea Bradley, 1969
- Dioryctria cibriani Mutuura & Neunzig, 1986
- Dioryctria clarioralis (Walker, 1863)
- Dioryctria contortella Mutuura, Munroe & Ross, 1969
- Dioryctria cuitecensis Neunzig, 1990
- Dioryctria delectella (Hulst, 1895)
- Dioryctria disclusa Heinrich, 1953
- Dioryctria dominguensis Neunzig, 1996
- Dioryctria durangoensis Mutuura & Neunzig, 1986
- Dioryctria ebeli Mutuura & Munroe, 1979
- Dioryctria erythropasa (Dyar, 1914)
- Dioryctria fanjingshana Li in Kuang & Li, 2009
- Dioryctria fordi Donahue & Neunzig, 2002
- Dioryctria gulosella (Hulst, 1890)
- Dioryctria hodgesi Neunzig, 2003
- Dioryctria horneana (Dyar, 1919)
- Dioryctria inyoensis Neunzig, 2003
- Dioryctria juniperella Yamanaka, 1990
- Dioryctria kunmingella Wang & Sung, 1985
- Dioryctria magnifica Munroe, 1958
- Dioryctria majorella Dyar, 1919
- Dioryctria martini Mutuura & Neunzig, 1986
- Dioryctria mendacella (Staudinger, 1859)
- Dioryctria merkeli Mutuura & Munroe, 1979
- Dioryctria mongolicella Wang & Sung, 1982
- Dioryctria monticolella Mutuura, Munroe & Ross, 1969
- Dioryctria muricativorella Neunzig, 2003
- Dioryctria mutuurai Neunzig, 2003
- Dioryctria nivaliensis Rebel, 1892
- Dioryctria okanaganella Mutuura, Munroe & Ross, 1969
- Dioryctria okui Mutuura, 1958
- Dioryctria peltieri de Joannis, 1908
- Dioryctria pentictonella Mutuura, Munroe & Ross, 1969
- Dioryctria peyerimhoffi de Joannis, 1921
- Dioryctria pineae (Staudinger, 1859)
- Dioryctria pinicolella Amsel, 1962
- Dioryctria ponderosae Dyar, 1914
- Dioryctria postmajorella Freyer, 1996
- Dioryctria pryeri Ragonot, 1893
- Dioryctria pseudotsugella Munroe, 1959
- Dioryctria pygmaeella Ragonot, 1887
- Dioryctria raoi Mutuura, 1971
- Dioryctria reniculelloides Mutuura & Munroe, 1973
- Dioryctria resiniphila Segerer & Pröse, 1997
- Dioryctria resinosella Mutuura, 1982
- Dioryctria robiniella (Millière, 1865)
- Dioryctria rossi Munroe, 1959
- Dioryctria rubella Hampson in Ragonot, 1901
- Dioryctria schuetzeella Fuchs, 1899
- Dioryctria sierra Neunzig, 2003
- Dioryctria simplicella Heinemann, 1863
- Dioryctria stenopterella Amsel, 1960
- Dioryctria subtracta Heinrich, 1956
- Dioryctria sylvestrella (Ratzeburg, 1840)
- Dioryctria symphoniella Hampson, 1899
- Dioryctria sysstratiotes Dyar, 1919
- Dioryctria taedae Schaber & Wood, 1971
- Dioryctria taedivorella Neunzig & Leidy, 1989
- Dioryctria taiella Amsel, 1970
- Dioryctria tumicolella Mutuura, Munroe & Ross, 1969
- Dioryctria vancouverella Mutuura, Munroe & Ross, 1969
- Dioryctria westerlandi Donahue & Neunzig, 2002
- Dioryctria yatesi Mutuura & Munroe, 1979
- Dioryctria yiai Mutuura & Munroe, 1972
- Dioryctria yuennanella Caradja in Caradja & Meyrick, 1937
- Dioryctria zimmermanni (Grote, 1877)

== Former species ==
- Dioryctria actualis is now Catastia actualis (Hulst, 1886)
