= Dioryctria martini =

Scientific classification
- Domain: Eukaryota
- Kingdom: Animalia
- Phylum: Arthropoda
- Class: Insecta
- Order: Lepidoptera
- Family: Pyralidae
- Genus: Dioryctria
- Species: D. martini

Binomial name
- Dioryctria martini Mutuura & Neunzig, 1986

Species of moth

Dioryctria martini is a species of snout moth in the genus Dioryctria. It was described by Akira Mutuura and Herbert H. Neunzig in 1986. It is found in the Mexican state of Durango and city of Toluca.

The length of the forewing is 14.5–17 mm.

The larvae feed on Pinus oocarpa.
