= Dioryctria horneana =

Scientific classification
- Kingdom: Animalia
- Phylum: Arthropoda
- Class: Insecta
- Order: Lepidoptera
- Family: Pyralidae
- Genus: Dioryctria
- Species: D. horneana

Binomial name
- Dioryctria horneana (Dyar, 1919)

Synonyms
- Pinipestis horneana Dyar, 1919

Species of moth

Dioryctria horneana is a species of snout moth in the genus Dioryctria. It was described by Harrison Gray Dyar Jr. in 1919 and is endemic to Cuba.

The wingspan is 22–30 mm.

The larvae feed on the cones of Pinus cubensis, Pinus caribea and Pinus tropicalis.
