= Dioryctria majorella =

Scientific classification
- Domain: Eukaryota
- Kingdom: Animalia
- Phylum: Arthropoda
- Class: Insecta
- Order: Lepidoptera
- Family: Pyralidae
- Genus: Dioryctria
- Species: D. majorella

Binomial name
- Dioryctria majorella Dyar, 1919

Synonyms
- Dioryctria muellerana Dyar, 1919

Species of moth

Dioryctria majorella is a species of snout moth in the genus Dioryctria. It was described by Harrison Gray Dyar Jr. in 1919 and is known from Mexico.

The wingspan is 20–26 mm.

The larvae feed on Pinus caribaea var. hondurensis, Pinus leiophylla, Pinus maximinoi and Pinus oocarpa. They feed in cones and branches infested by Cronartium conigenum.
