= Dioryctria inyoensis =

Scientific classification
- Domain: Eukaryota
- Kingdom: Animalia
- Phylum: Arthropoda
- Class: Insecta
- Order: Lepidoptera
- Family: Pyralidae
- Genus: Dioryctria
- Species: D. inyoensis

Binomial name
- Dioryctria inyoensis Neunzig, 2003

Species of moth

Dioryctria inyoensis is a species of snout moth in the genus Dioryctria. It was described by Herbert H. Neunzig in 2003 and is known from the US state of California.
