= Dioryctria cibriani =

Scientific classification
- Domain: Eukaryota
- Kingdom: Animalia
- Phylum: Arthropoda
- Class: Insecta
- Order: Lepidoptera
- Family: Pyralidae
- Genus: Dioryctria
- Species: D. cibriani

Binomial name
- Dioryctria cibriani Mutuura & Neunzig, 1986

Species of moth

Dioryctria cibriani is a species of snout moth in the genus Dioryctria. It was described by Akira Mutuura and Herbert H. Neunzig in 1986 and is known from Mexico.
