= Dioryctria mongolicella =

Scientific classification
- Domain: Eukaryota
- Kingdom: Animalia
- Phylum: Arthropoda
- Class: Insecta
- Order: Lepidoptera
- Family: Pyralidae
- Genus: Dioryctria
- Species: D. mongolicella

Binomial name
- Dioryctria mongolicella Wang & Sung, 1982

Species of moth

Dioryctria mongolicella is a species of snout moth in the genus Dioryctria. It was described by Wang and Sung in 1982, and is known from north-eastern China and Mongolia.

The wingspan is 24–27 mm. The forewings are dark black. There is one generation per year.

The larvae feed on Pinus sylvestris var. mongolica and Pinus koraiensis. In late April of the following year, they resume feeding. In late June, the larvae mature and begin to pupate.
