= Dioryctria yuennanella =

Scientific classification
- Kingdom: Animalia
- Phylum: Arthropoda
- Class: Insecta
- Order: Lepidoptera
- Family: Pyralidae
- Genus: Dioryctria
- Species: D. yuennanella

Binomial name
- Dioryctria yuennanella Caradja in Caradja & Meyrick, 1937

Species of moth

Dioryctria yuennanella is a species of snout moth in the genus Dioryctria. It was described by Aristide Caradja in 1937 and is known from Yunnan, China.

The larvae feed on Pinus armandii. They damage two-year-old cones during the rapid growth period.
