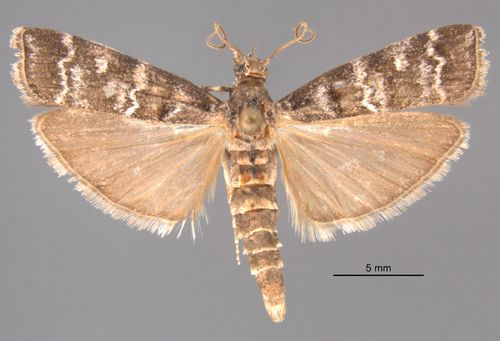

Scientific classification
- Kingdom: Animalia
- Phylum: Arthropoda
- Class: Insecta
- Order: Lepidoptera
- Family: Pyralidae
- Genus: Dioryctria
- Species: D. taedae

Binomial name
- Dioryctria taedae Schaber & Wood, 1971

= Dioryctria taedae =

Species of moth

Dioryctria taedae is a species of snout moth. It was described by Schaber and Wood in 1971, and is known from Maryland to the south-eastern United States.

The length of the forewings is about 12 mm. There are two generations per year, with adults on wing in late August and again in early October.

The larvae feed on loblolly pine (Pinus taeda).
