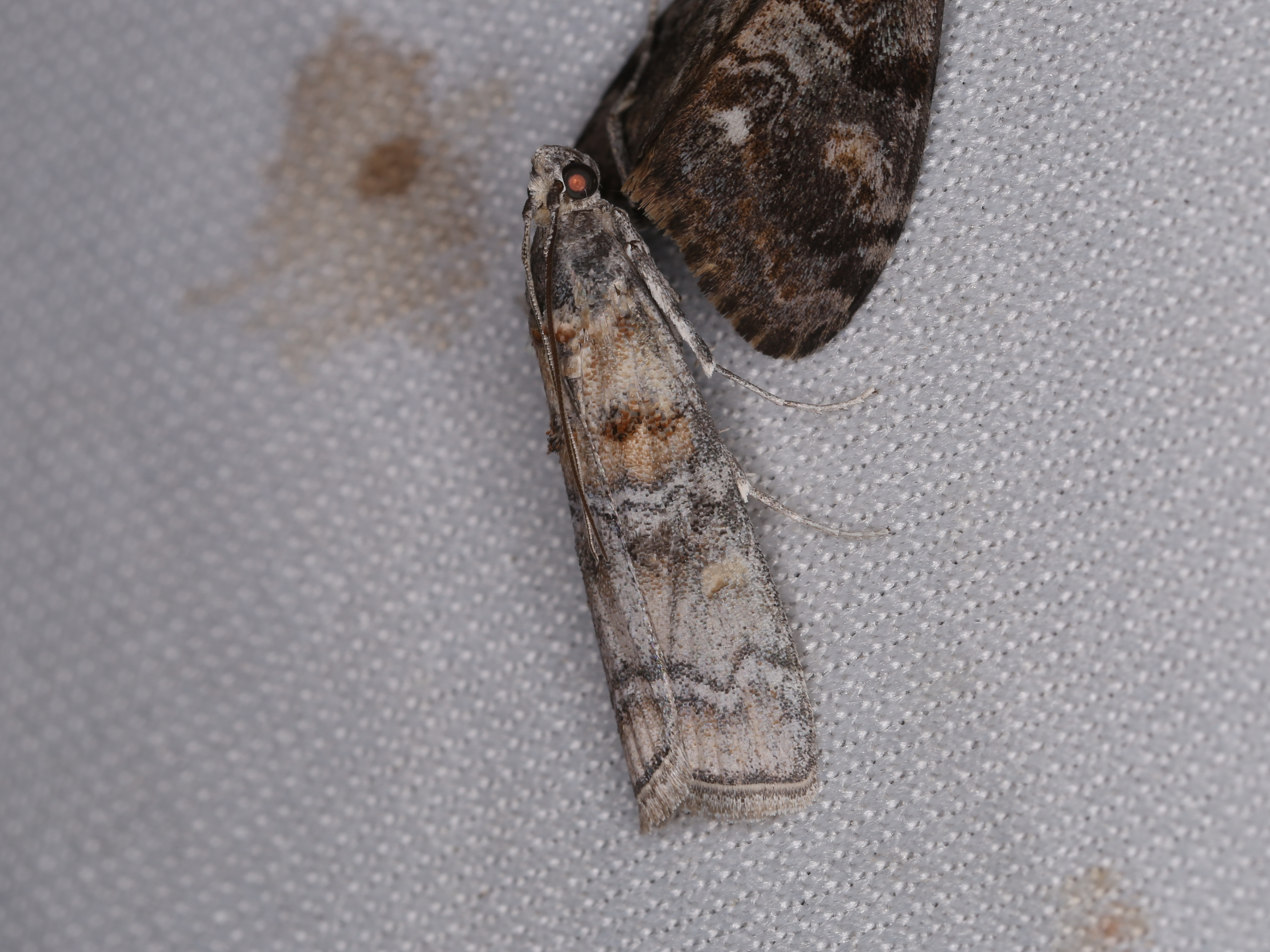
- Dioryctria fordi

Scientific classification
- Domain: Eukaryota
- Kingdom: Animalia
- Phylum: Arthropoda
- Class: Insecta
- Order: Lepidoptera
- Family: Pyralidae
- Genus: Dioryctria
- Species: D. fordi

Binomial name
- Dioryctria fordi Donahue & Neunzig, 2002

= Dioryctria fordi =

Species of moth

Dioryctria fordi is a species of snout moth in the genus Dioryctria. It was described by Julian P. Donahue and Herbert H. Neunzig in 2002 and is known from the US state of California.

The wingspan is about 15 millimetres (0.59 in). Adults are on wing from June to October.

The larvae possibly feed on Pinus sabiniana.
