= Dioryctria magnifica =

Scientific classification
- Domain: Eukaryota
- Kingdom: Animalia
- Phylum: Arthropoda
- Class: Insecta
- Order: Lepidoptera
- Family: Pyralidae
- Genus: Dioryctria
- Species: D. magnifica

Binomial name
- Dioryctria magnifica Munroe, 1958

Species of moth

Dioryctria magnifica is a species of snout moth in the genus Dioryctria. It was described by Eugene G. Munroe in 1958 and is known from China.
