= Dioryctria westerlandi =

Scientific classification
- Domain: Eukaryota
- Kingdom: Animalia
- Phylum: Arthropoda
- Class: Insecta
- Order: Lepidoptera
- Family: Pyralidae
- Genus: Dioryctria
- Species: D. westerlandi

Binomial name
- Dioryctria westerlandi Donahue & Neunzig, 2002

Species of moth

Dioryctria westerlandi is a species of snout moth in the genus Dioryctria. It was described by Julian P. Donahue and Herbert H. Neunzig in 2002 and is known from the US state of California, but the range may extend into Nevada.

The wingspan is 13.5–18.5 millimetres (0.53–0.73 in). Adults are pale with strongly contrasting transverse bands and reddish patches. Adults are on wing from July to October.

The larvae possibly feed on Pinus jeffreyi.
