= Dioryctria taiella =

Scientific classification
- Domain: Eukaryota
- Kingdom: Animalia
- Phylum: Arthropoda
- Class: Insecta
- Order: Lepidoptera
- Family: Pyralidae
- Genus: Dioryctria
- Species: D. taiella

Binomial name
- Dioryctria taiella Amsel, 1970

Species of moth

Dioryctria taiella is a species of snout moth in the genus Dioryctria. It was described by Hans Georg Amsel in 1970 and is known from Afghanistan and Pakistan.

The larvae feed on Arceuthobium oxycedri.
