= Dioryctria raoi =

Scientific classification
- Kingdom: Animalia
- Phylum: Arthropoda
- Class: Insecta
- Order: Lepidoptera
- Family: Pyralidae
- Genus: Dioryctria
- Species: D. raoi

Binomial name
- Dioryctria raoi Mutuura, 1971

Species of moth

Dioryctria raoi is a species of snout moth. It was described by Akira Mutuura in 1971 and is known from northern India.

The larvae feed on Pinus roxburghii and other Pinus species. They bore in the shoots of their host plant.
