= Dioryctria kunmingella =

Scientific classification
- Domain: Eukaryota
- Kingdom: Animalia
- Phylum: Arthropoda
- Class: Insecta
- Order: Lepidoptera
- Family: Pyralidae
- Genus: Dioryctria
- Species: D. kunmingella

Binomial name
- Dioryctria kunmingella Wang & Sung, 1985

Species of moth

Dioryctria kunmingella is a species of snout moth in the genus Dioryctria. It was described by Ping-Yuan Wang and Shih-Mei Sung in 1985 and is known from China.
