= Dioryctria cuitecensis =

Scientific classification
- Domain: Eukaryota
- Kingdom: Animalia
- Phylum: Arthropoda
- Class: Insecta
- Order: Lepidoptera
- Family: Pyralidae
- Genus: Dioryctria
- Species: D. cuitecensis

Binomial name
- Dioryctria cuitecensis Neunzig, 1990

Species of moth

Dioryctria cuitecensis is a species of snout moth in the genus Dioryctria. It was described by Herbert H. Neunzig in 1990 and is known from Cuiteco, Mexico, from which its species epithet is derived.

The length of the forewings is 15.5–17 mm. Adults are large, dark and uniformly marked.
