= 1966 Pulitzer Prize =

Awards for journalism and related fields

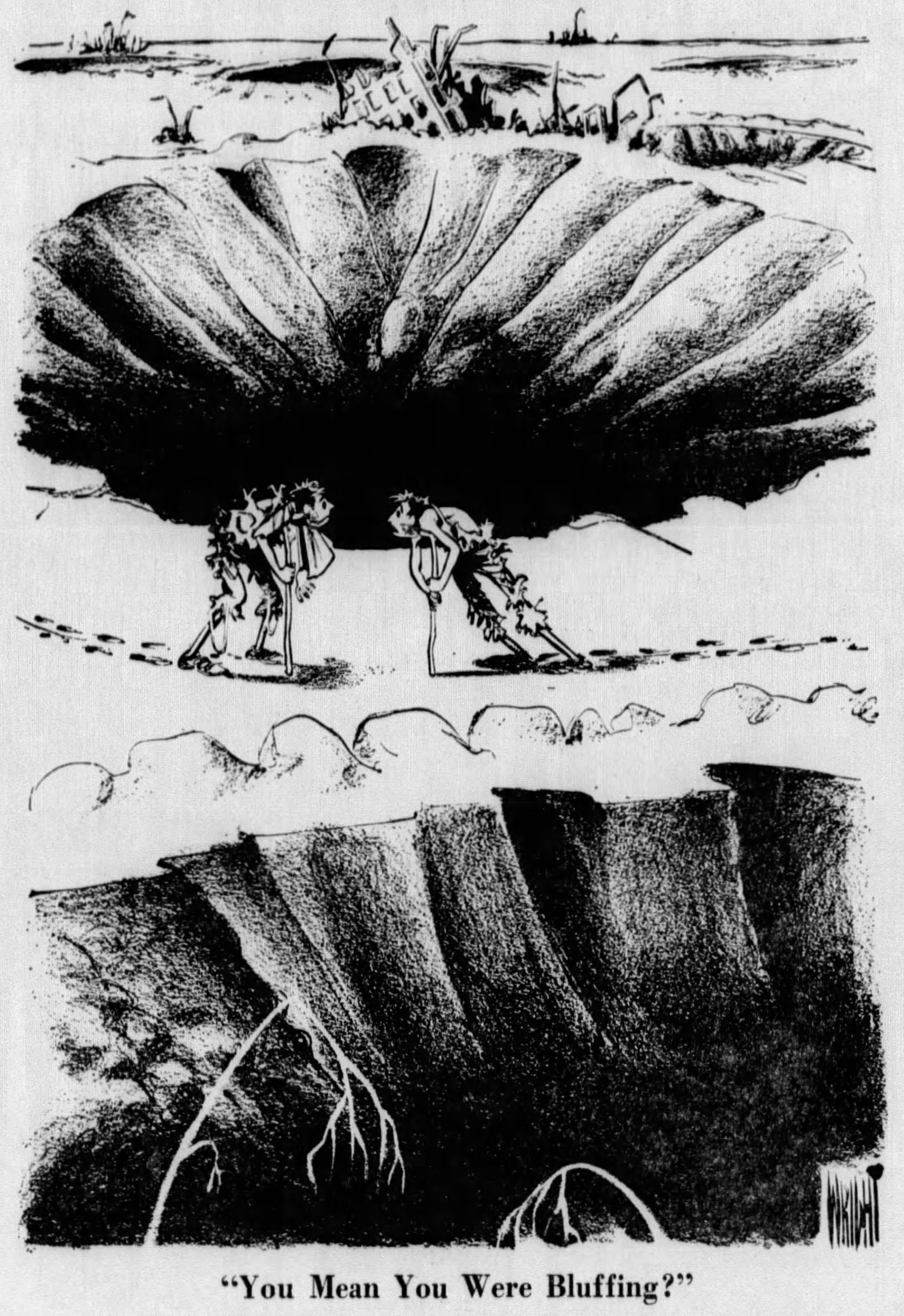
The prize-winning cartoon, "You Mean You Were Bluffing?"

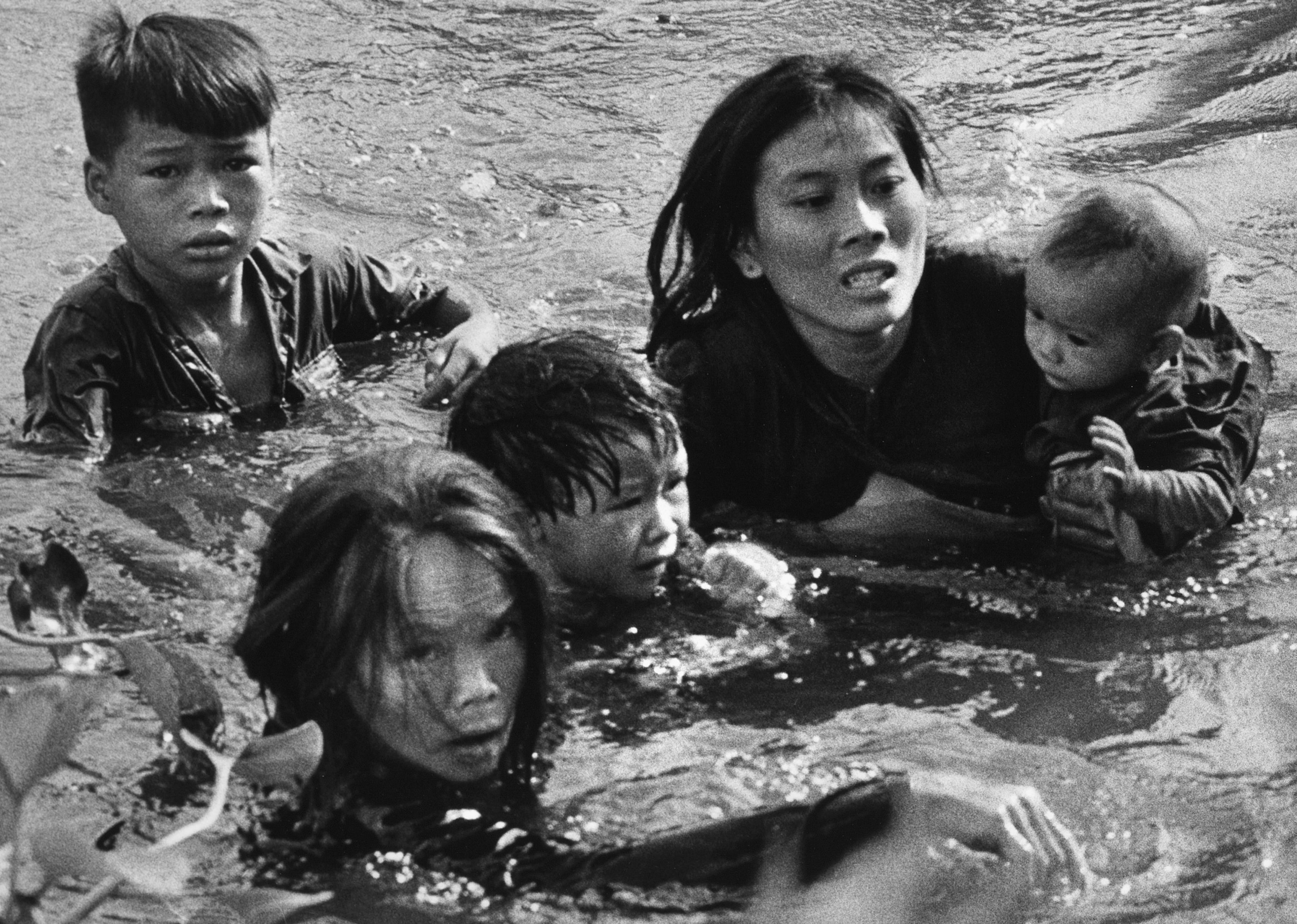
"Flee to Safety", cited as an exemplary work by the prize-winning photographer

The following are the Pulitzer Prizes for 1966.

== Journalism awards ==
- Public Service:
  - The Boston Globe, for its campaign to prevent confirmation of Francis X. Morrissey as a federal district judge in Massachusetts.
- Local General or Spot News Reporting:
  - Staff of the Los Angeles Times, for its coverage of the Watts Riots.
- Local Investigative Specialized Reporting:
  - John Anthony Frasca of The Tampa Tribune, for his investigation and reporting of two robberies that resulted in the freeing of an innocent man.
- National Reporting:
  - Haynes Johnson of the Washington Evening Star, for his distinguished coverage of the civil rights conflict centered about Selma, Alabama, and particularly his reporting of its aftermath.
- International Reporting:
  - Peter Arnett of the Associated Press, for his coverage of the Vietnam War.
- Editorial Writing:
  - Robert Lasch of the St. Louis Post-Dispatch, for his distinguished editorial writing in 1965, exemplified by "The Containment of Ideas".
- Editorial Cartooning:
  - Don Wright of The Miami News, for "You Mean You Were Bluffing?"
- Photography:
  - Kyoichi Sawada of United Press International, for his combat photography of the Vietnam War during 1965. A photo entitled "Flee to Safety", depicting a Vietnamese family wading across a river after their village was attacked, was cited as a noted example of his work.

== Letters, Drama and Music Awards ==
- Fiction:
  - Collected Stories by Katherine Anne Porter (Harcourt).
- Drama:
  - No award given.
- History:
  - The Life of the Mind in America by Perry Miller (Harcourt).
- Biography or Autobiography:
  - A Thousand Days by Arthur Schlesinger, Jr. (Houghton).
- Poetry:
  - Selected Poems by Richard Eberhart (New Directions).
- General Nonfiction:
  - Wandering Through Winter by Edwin Way Teale (Dodd).
- Music:
  - Variations for Orchestra by Leslie Bassett (Peters)
    It was first performed in the United States by Eugene Ormandy and the Philadelphia Orchestra at the Academy of Music in Philadelphia on October 22, 1965.
