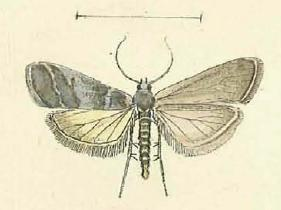
- Episcythrastis tabidella

Scientific classification
- Kingdom: Animalia
- Phylum: Arthropoda
- Clade: Pancrustacea
- Class: Insecta
- Order: Lepidoptera
- Family: Pyralidae
- Subfamily: Phycitinae
- Tribe: Phycitini
- Genus: Episcythrastis; Meyrick, 1937

= Episcythrastis =

Genus of moths

Episcythrastis is a genus of moths of the family Pyralidae described by Edward Meyrick in 1937.

== Species ==
- Episcythrastis elaphitis Meyrick, 1937
- Episcythrastis minuta (Balinsky, 1994) [?]
- Episcythrastis tabidella (Mann, 1864) (See alternatively as Myelopsis tabidella (Mann, 1864))
- Episcythrastis tetricella (Denis & Schiffermüller, 1775) (See alternatively as Myelopsis tetricella (Denis & Schiffermüller, 1775))

Also [?] Episcythrastis amurensis (Ragonot, 1887) - Russia (Amur) [possibly a variety or subspecies of E. tetricella per Leraut, 2021]

== Former species ==
The following are typically now placed in Myelopsis, although several in the past have been treated as a synonym of Episcythrastis:

- Myelopsis alatella (Hulst, 1887)
- Myelopsis davidi Handfield, 2025
- Myelopsis immundella (Hulst, 1890)
- Myelopsis minutulella (Hulst, 1887)
- Myelopsis subtetricella (Ragonot, 1889)
