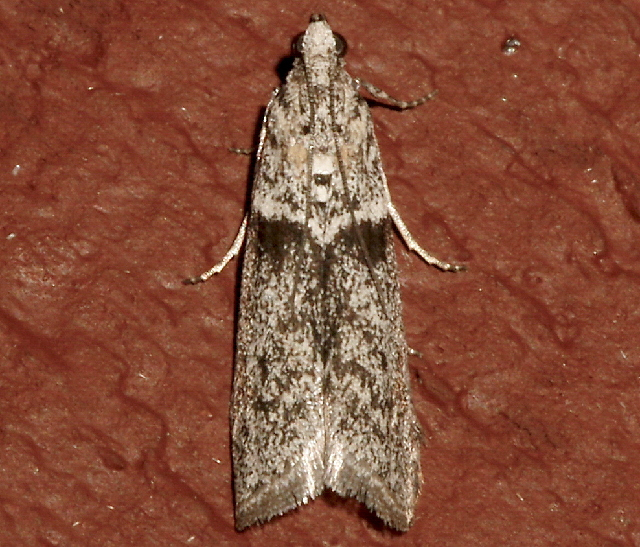
- Myelopsis minutularia

Scientific classification
- Kingdom: Animalia
- Phylum: Arthropoda
- Clade: Pancrustacea
- Class: Insecta
- Order: Lepidoptera
- Family: Pyralidae
- Tribe: Phycitini
- Genus: Myelopsis; Heinrich, 1956

= Myelopsis =

Genus of moths

Myelopsis is a genus of moths of the family Pyralidae described by Carl Heinrich in 1956. It is sometimes included in the genus Episcythrastis.

== Species ==
- Myelopsis alatella (Hulst, 1887) - USA (Southerwest: California to Texas)
- [?] Myelopsis amurensis (Ragonot, 1887) - Russia (Amur) [possibly a variety or subspecies of M. tetricella (Leraut, 2021)]
- Myelopsis davidi Handfield, 2025 - Canada (all provinces)
- Myelopsis immundella (Hulst, 1890) - USA (Texas)
- Myelopsis minutulella (Hulst, 1887) - USA (Texas, etc) [= Myelopsis minutularia (Hulst, 1887)]
- Myelopsis subtetricella (Ragonot, 1889) - USA (many), Canada (several)
- [?] Myelopsis tabidella (Mann, 1864) - Europe (Bulgaria, etc), Eurasia (Turkey, Armenia); but see elsewhere as Episcythrastis tabidella (Mann, 1864)
- [?] Myelopsis tetricella (Denis & Schiffermüller, 1775) - Europe (Central, etc); but see elsewhere as Episcythrastis tetricella (Denis & Schiffermüller, 1775)

Additional species of doubtful affinities:

- Myelopsis difficilis Roesler and Küppers, 1981 - Indonesia (Sumatra)
- Myelopsis tigadolokiaa Roesler and Küppers, 1981 - Indonesia (Sumatra)
- Myelopsis varunaa Roesler and Küppers, 1981 - Indonesia (Sumatra)

Else, Myelopsis rectistrigella (Ragonot, 1887) may be listed by some.
