= Eufernaldia =

Scientific classification
- Domain: Eukaryota
- Kingdom: Animalia
- Phylum: Arthropoda
- Class: Insecta
- Order: Lepidoptera
- Family: Crambidae
- Subfamily: Crambinae
- Tribe: Ancylolomiini
- Genus: Eufernaldia; Hulst, 1900

Genus of moths

Eufernaldia is a genus of moths of the family Crambidae.

== Species ==
- Eufernaldia cadarellus (Druce, 1896)
- Eufernaldia misgabellus (Druce, 1896)
- Eufernaldia panamella Schaus, 1922
- Eufernaldia sinaloellus (Schaus, 1922)
