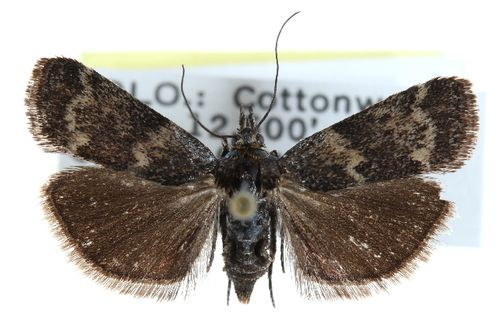

Scientific classification
- Domain: Eukaryota
- Kingdom: Animalia
- Phylum: Arthropoda
- Class: Insecta
- Order: Lepidoptera
- Family: Pyralidae
- Genus: Catastia
- Species: C. incorruscella

Binomial name
- Catastia incorruscella (Hulst, 1895)

Synonyms
- Pyla incorruscella Hulst, 1895

= Catastia incorruscella =

Species of moth

Catastia incorruscella is a species of snout moth in the genus Catastia. It was described by George Duryea Hulst in 1895. It is found in North America, including Colorado, Utah and California.
