= Parapheromia configurata =

Scientific classification
- Domain: Eukaryota
- Kingdom: Animalia
- Phylum: Arthropoda
- Class: Insecta
- Order: Lepidoptera
- Family: Geometridae
- Genus: Parapheromia
- Species: P. configurata

Binomial name
- Parapheromia configurata (Hulst, 1898)

Species of moth

Parapheromia configurata is a species of geometrid moth in the family Geometridae. It is found in North America.

The MONA or Hodges number for Parapheromia configurata is 6611.

== Subspecies ==
These two subspecies belong to the species Parapheromia configurata:

- Parapheromia configurata configurata
- Parapheromia configurata falsata McDunnough
