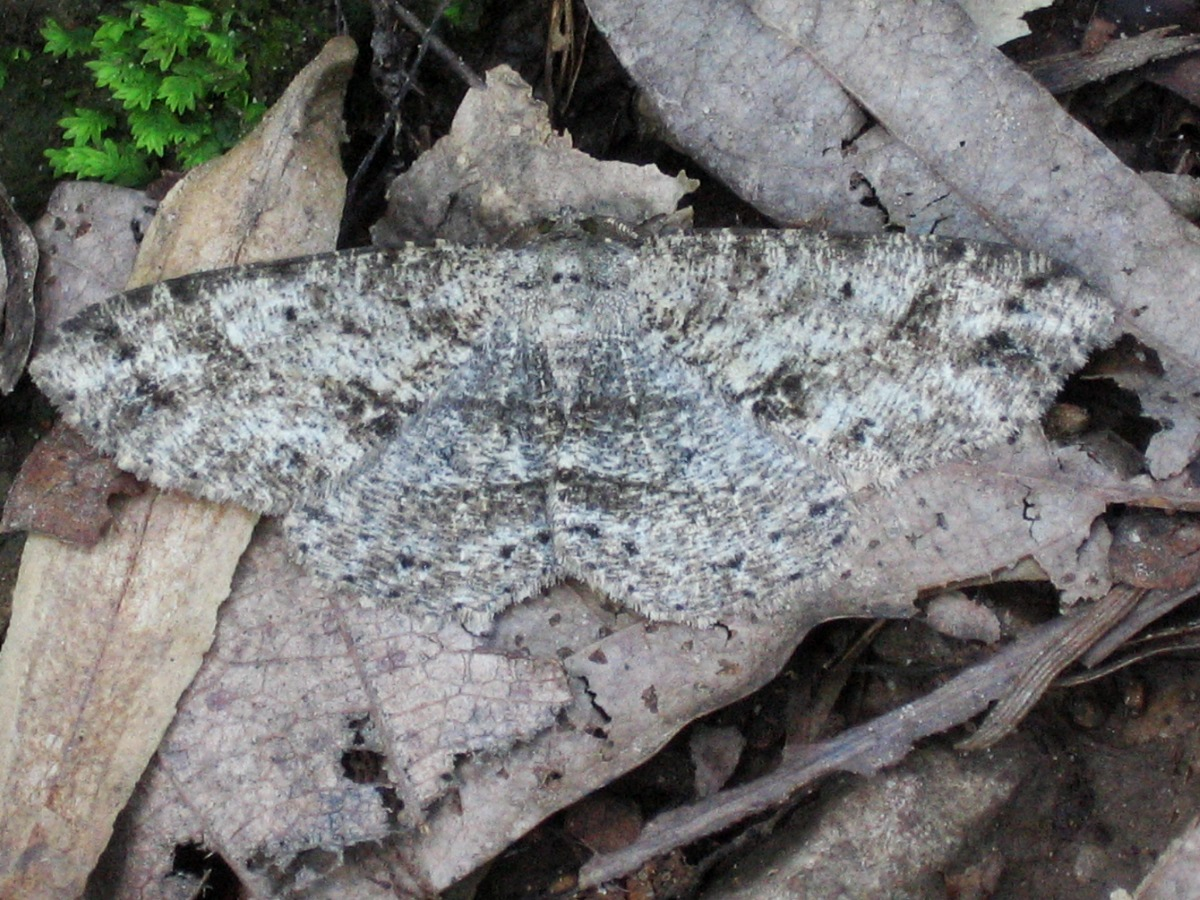
- Canadian Melanolophia (Melanolophia canadaria).

Scientific classification
- Domain: Eukaryota
- Kingdom: Animalia
- Phylum: Arthropoda
- Class: Insecta
- Order: Lepidoptera
- Family: Geometridae
- Tribe: Melanolophiini
- Genus: Melanolophia; Hulst, 1896

= Melanolophia =

Genus of moths

Melanolophia is a genus of moths in the family Geometridae described by George Duryea Hulst in 1896.

== Species ==
- Melanolophia canadaria (Guenée, 1857)
- Melanolophia centralis McDunnough, 1920
- Melanolophia imitata (Walker, 1860)
- Melanolophia imperfectaria (Walker, 1860)
- Melanolophia sadrinaria Rindge, 1964
- Melanolophia signataria (Walker, 1860)
