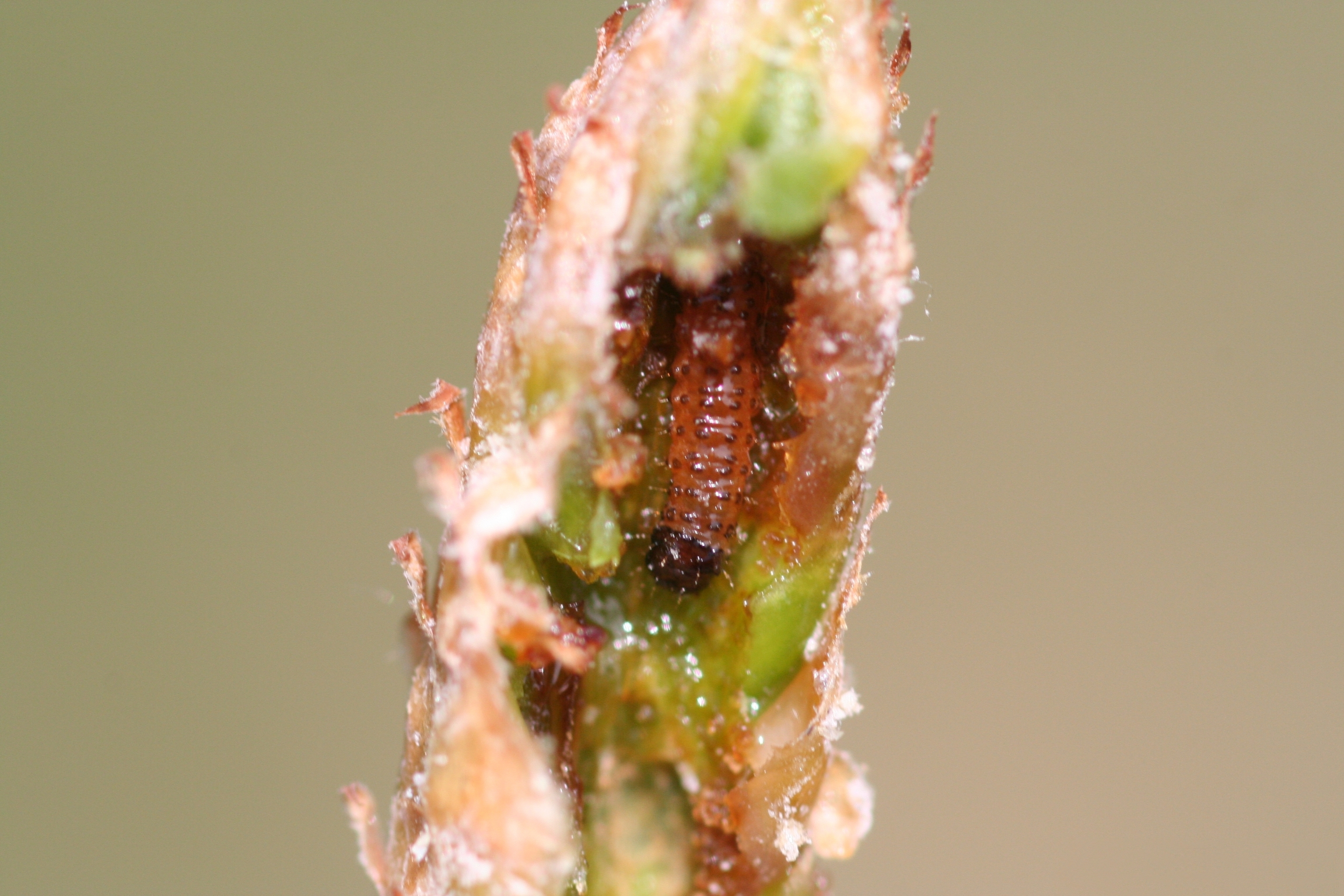
- Larvae

Scientific classification
- Domain: Eukaryota
- Kingdom: Animalia
- Phylum: Arthropoda
- Class: Insecta
- Order: Lepidoptera
- Family: Pyralidae
- Genus: Dioryctria
- Species: D. albovittella

Binomial name
- Dioryctria albovittella (Hulst, 1900)

Synonyms
- Pinipestis albovittella Hulst, 1900

= Dioryctria albovittella =

Species of moth

Dioryctria albovittella, the pinyon tip moth, is a species of moth of the family Pyralidae. It is found in North America including New Mexico.

The wingspan is about 25 mm. Adult are on wing from late June to August in one generation per year.

The larvae feed on pinyon pine.

== Gallery ==
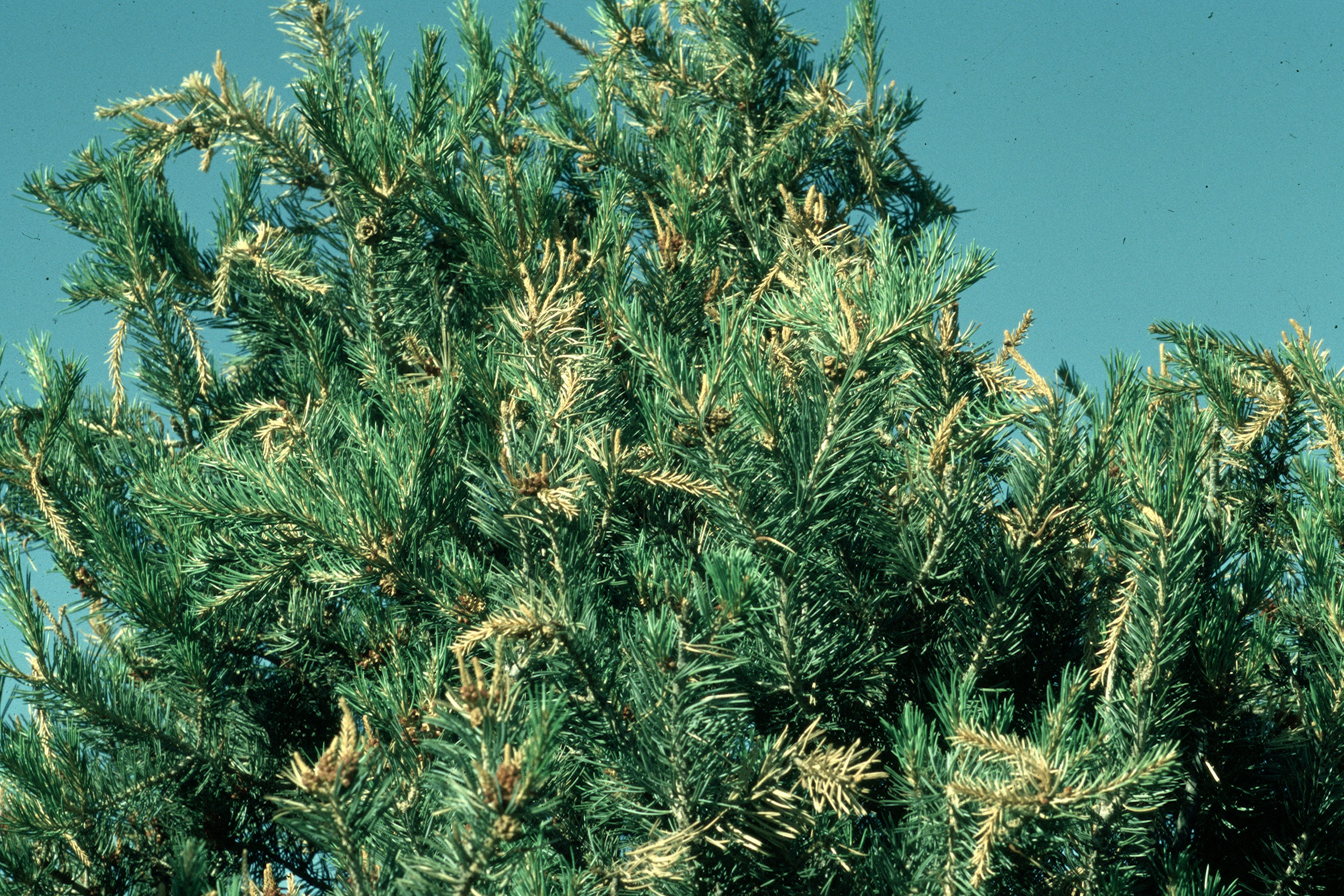
Damage

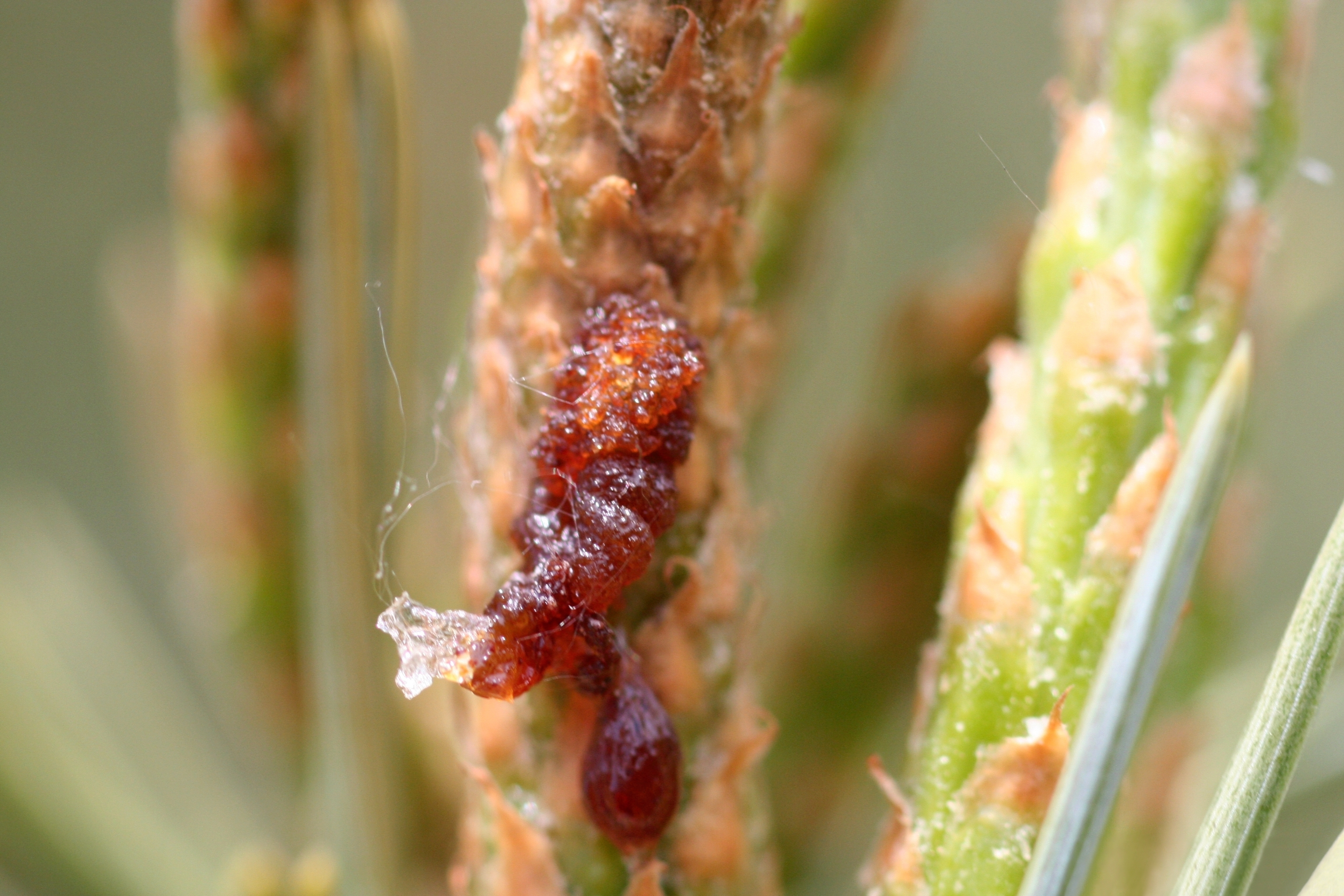
Damage

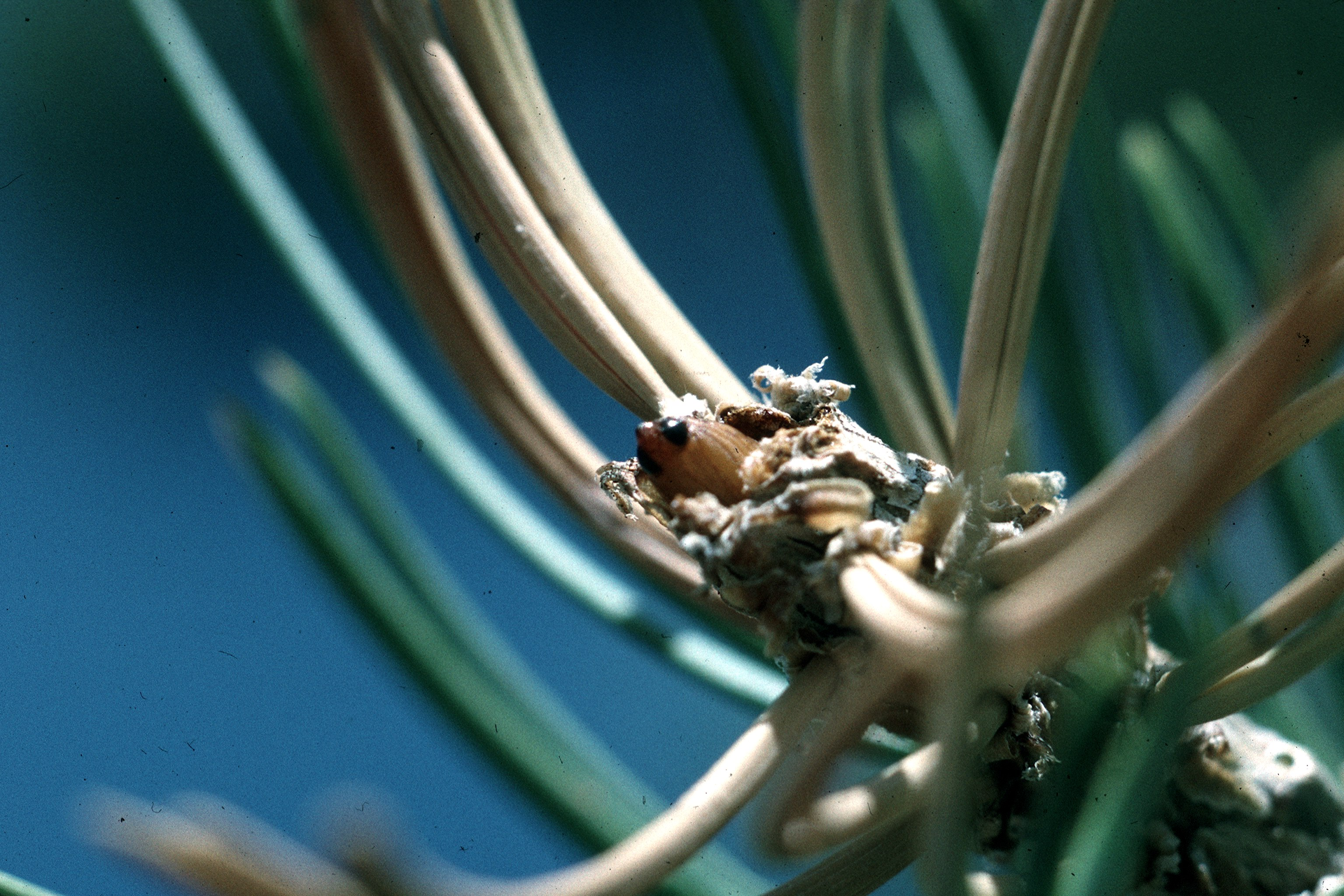
Pupa
