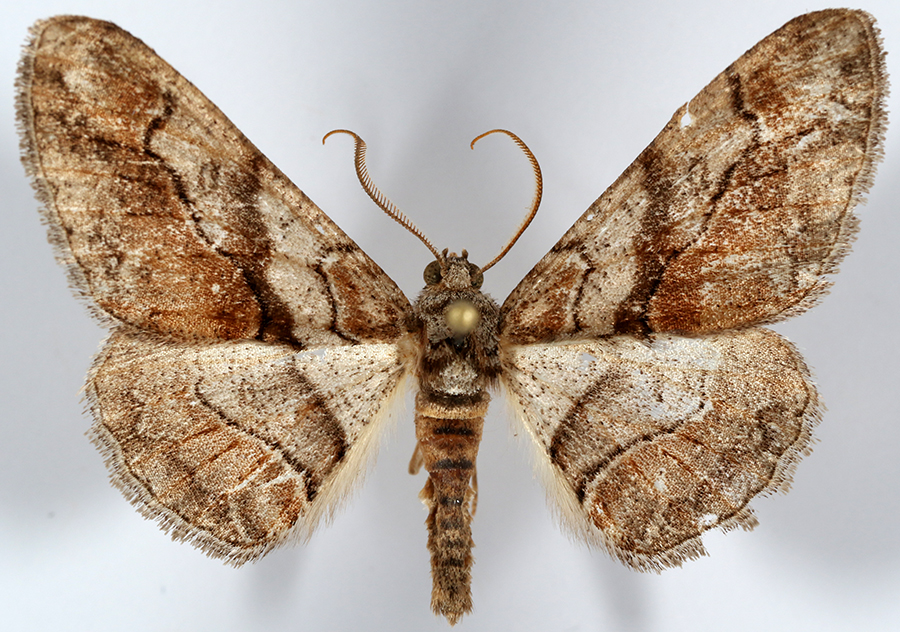

Scientific classification
- Kingdom: Animalia
- Phylum: Arthropoda
- Clade: Pancrustacea
- Class: Insecta
- Order: Lepidoptera
- Family: Geometridae
- Genus: Mericisca
- Species: M. gracea

Binomial name
- Mericisca gracea Hulst, 1896

= Mericisca gracea =

Species of moth

Mericisca gracea is a species of geometrid moth in the family Geometridae. It is found in North America.
