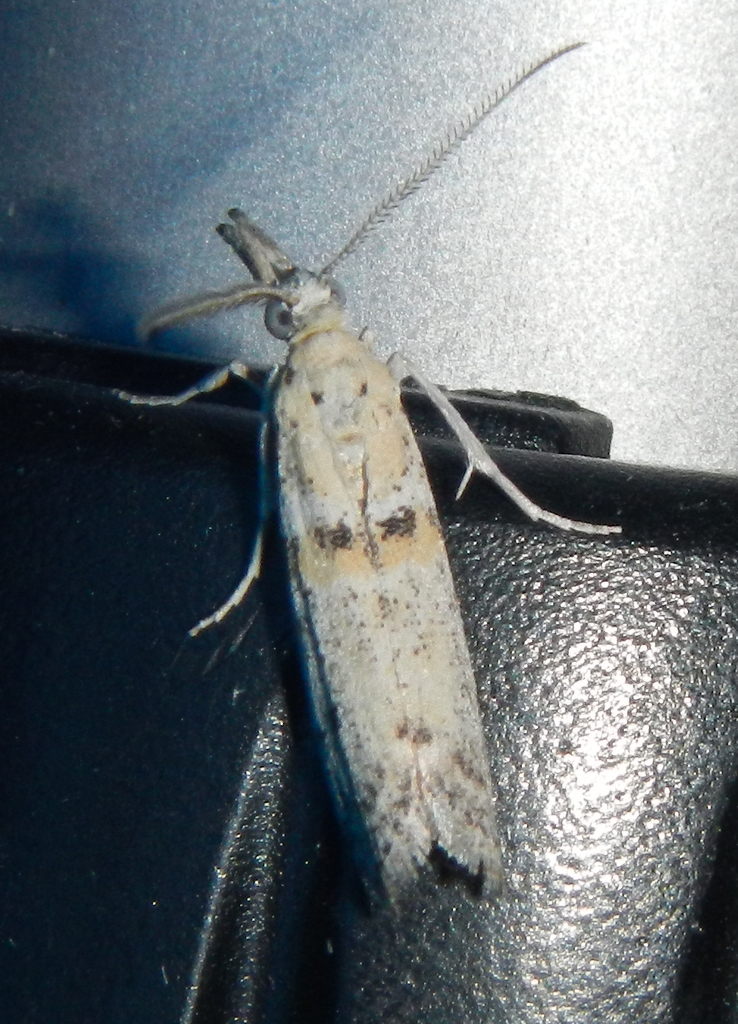

Scientific classification
- Kingdom: Animalia
- Phylum: Arthropoda
- Clade: Pancrustacea
- Class: Insecta
- Order: Lepidoptera
- Family: Pyralidae
- Genus: Eumysia
- Species: E. pallidipennella

Binomial name
- Eumysia pallidipennella (Hulst, 1895)

Synonyms
- Volusia pallidipennella Hulst, 1895

= Eumysia pallidipennella =

Species of moth

Eumysia pallidipennella is a species of snout moth in the genus Eumysia. It was described by George Duryea Hulst in 1895. It is found in the US state of California.
