= Myelopsis immundella =

Scientific classification
- Kingdom: Animalia
- Phylum: Arthropoda
- Class: Insecta
- Order: Lepidoptera
- Family: Pyralidae
- Genus: Myelopsis
- Species: M. immundella

Binomial name
- Myelopsis immundella (Hulst, 1890)

Synonyms
- Myelois immundella Hulst, 1890; Episcythrastis immundella

Species of moth

Myelopsis immundella is a species of snout moth in the genus Episcythrastis. It was described by George Duryea Hulst in 1890. It is found in Texas and Arizona.
