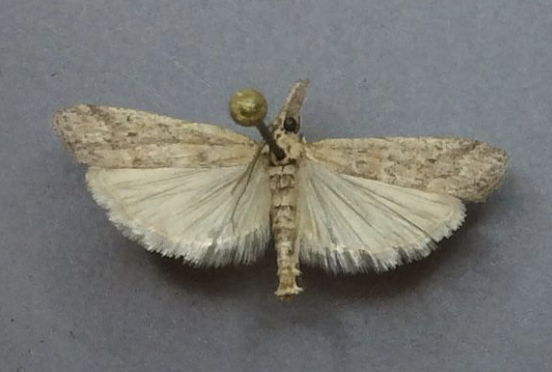

Scientific classification
- Domain: Eukaryota
- Kingdom: Animalia
- Phylum: Arthropoda
- Class: Insecta
- Order: Lepidoptera
- Family: Pyralidae
- Genus: Eumysia
- Species: E. fuscatella

Binomial name
- Eumysia fuscatella (Hulst, 1900)

Synonyms
- Zophodia fuscatella Hulst, 1900

= Eumysia fuscatella =

Species of moth

Eumysia fuscatella is a species of snout moth in the genus Eumysia. It was described by George Duryea Hulst in 1900. It is endemic to California.
