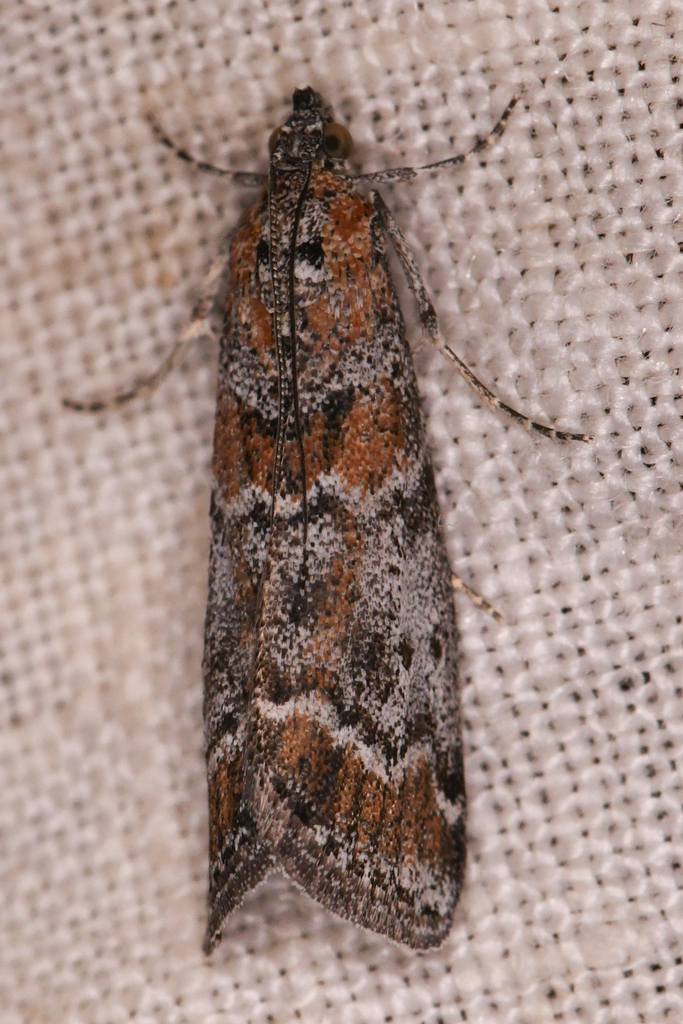

Scientific classification
- Domain: Eukaryota
- Kingdom: Animalia
- Phylum: Arthropoda
- Class: Insecta
- Order: Lepidoptera
- Family: Pyralidae
- Genus: Catastia
- Species: C. actualis

Binomial name
- Catastia actualis (Hulst, 1886)

Synonyms
- Nephopteryx actualis Hulst, 1886; Dioryctria actualis

= Catastia actualis =

Species of moth

Catastia actualis is a species of snout moth in the genus Catastia. It was described by George Duryea Hulst in 1886. It is found from Saskatchewan and Alberta to Colorado and north-eastern California to Lake Tahoe.

The length of the forewings is 12–14 mm. Adults are on wing from June to early July.
