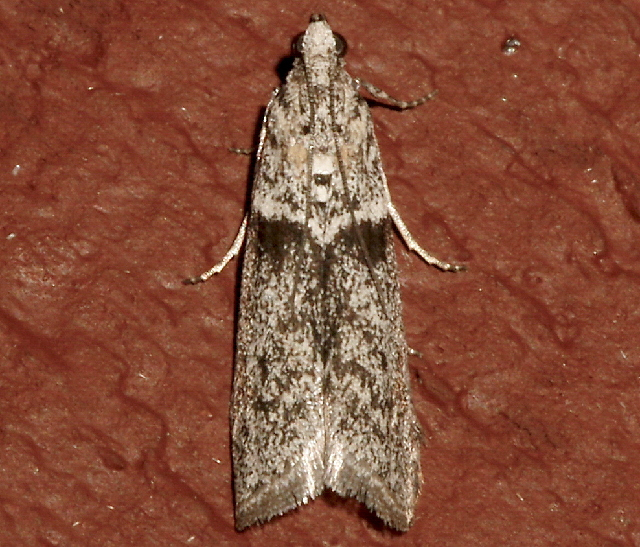

Scientific classification
- Kingdom: Animalia
- Phylum: Arthropoda
- Clade: Pancrustacea
- Class: Insecta
- Order: Lepidoptera
- Family: Pyralidae
- Genus: Myelopsis
- Species: M. minutulella

Binomial name
- Myelopsis minutulella (Hulst, 1887)

Synonyms
- Dioryctria minutularia Hulst, 1887 (Original misspelling); Dioryctria minutulella Hulst, 1887 (Emended spelling); Episcythrastis minutularia (Hulst, 1887); Myelois coniella Ragonot, 1887; Rampylla nefas Dyar, 1922

= Myelopsis minutulella =

Species of moth

Myelopsis minutulella (Elsewhere as original misspelling Myelopsis minutularia) is a species of snout moth in the genus Myelopsis but was previously thought to belong in Episcythrastis, but originally in Dioryctria. It was described by George Duryea Hulst in 1887. It is found in southern parts of North America, such as Texas and Northern Mexico.
