= Nellie Teale =

American naturalist and conservationist (1900–1993)

Nellie I. Teale
- Born: Nellie Imogene Donovan; September 13, 1900; Colorado Springs, Colorado
- Died: July 18, 1993 (aged 92); Windham, Connecticut
- Education: Earlham College
- Occupation: Naturalist
- Spouse: Edwin Way Teale (m. 1923; died 1980)
- Children: 1

Nellie Imogene Teale (née Donovan; 1900–1993) was an American naturalist and conservationist. She was an important contributor to the nature writing of her husband, Edwin Way Teale, serving as researcher, critic, and editor for his manuscripts. She was noted for her keen observations of flora and fauna; her motto was to "go slow and see more".

Teale and her husband traveled throughout North America, documenting natural history and covering over 76,000 miles during a 15-year period. She graduated from Earlham College in Indiana and was on the faculty of Friends University in Kansas. From 1959, the Teales lived in northern Connecticut near the wilderness at a property they named Trail Head. They donated their property to the Connecticut Audubon Society.

== Early life, education and marriage ==
Nellie Imogene Donovan was born in Colorado Springs, Colorado, on September 13, 1900. She attended Earlham College, in Richmond, Indiana. She met Edwin Way Teale at the college in 1921, where both were majoring in English. She graduated in 1923, married Teale, and moved to Wichita, Kansas, where they were both faculty at Friends University. Nellie was the university's athletic director.

== Nature travels and Trail Wood ==
The Teales moved to New York City in 1924 and had a son, David Allen, in 1925. From 1928 to 1941, Teale was a homemaker and raised her son. They lived in Baldwin on Long Island, where they established an insect garden that became the basis for Edwin's 1937 nature book Grassroots Jungle. In 1945, their son David, then 19 years old, was killed in action on a reconnaissance mission in Germany.

Teale was an important contributor to her husband's nature writing, serving as a researcher, critic, and editor for his manuscripts. They traveled together across North America in an automobile full of photography equipment, chronicling natural history and documenting their experiences. Nellie was noted for her astute observations of flora and fauna, and for having a better understanding of birds than her husband. In 1947, the Teales decided to drive from the south of Florida to Maine, documenting the spring along their route. The 17,000-mile journey was recounted in Teale's book North with the Spring. Over a 15-year period, they traveled some 76,000 miles, in every season. Edwin wrote The American Seasons, a four-part series documenting their travels and the natural history of the continent. The fourth book in the series, Wandering Through Winter won the Pulitzer Prize for General Nonfiction in 1965.

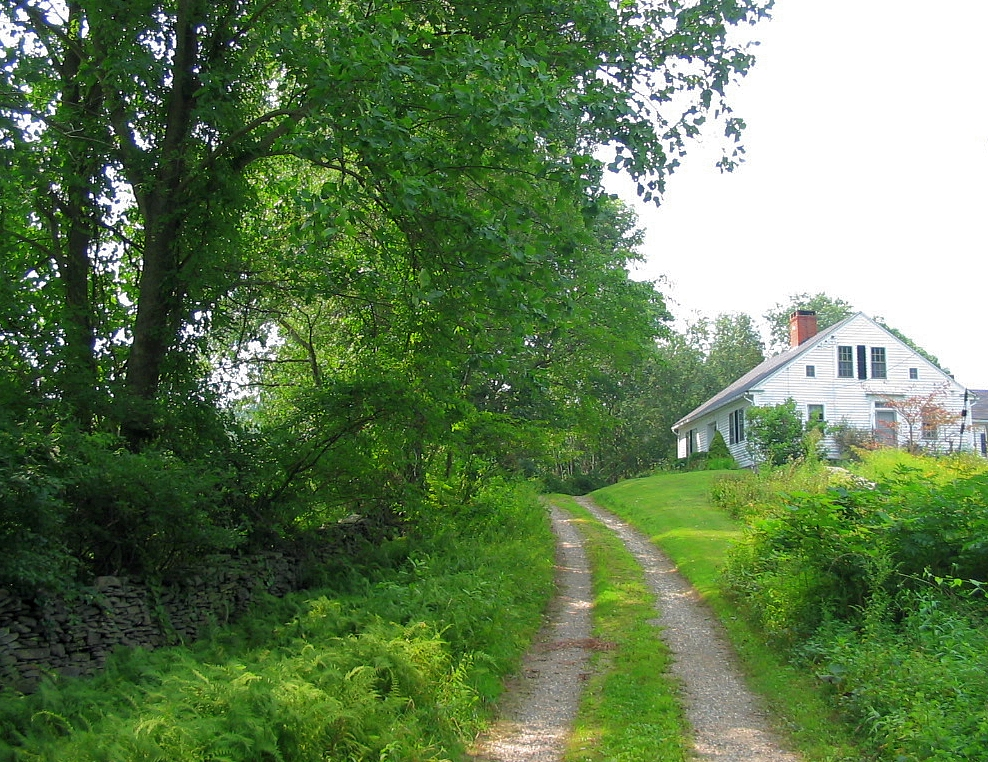
Trail Wood, the home of the Teales near Hampton

The Teales moved to north central Connecticut in 1959, purchasing an 1806 farmhouse and property near Hampton that they named Trail Wood. They made trails through the property, which included two brooks, a waterfall, swamps, fields, and forest. Teale's book A Naturalist Buys an Old Farm recounts their experiences at Trail Wood. He writes in the book that Nellie's motto was to "go slow and see more".

== Later life ==
Teale and her husband befriended many naturalists and authors, including Rachel Carson and John Kieran. Nellie served on the board of Hampton's Fletcher Memorial Library. She and her husband were also members of several organizations, including the New York Entomological Society, The Explorers Club, the John Burroughs Memorial Association, and the Thoreau Society.

In 1979, the Teales donated their 140-acre property to the Connecticut Audubon Society. Following her husband's death in 1980, she donated his letters and books to the University of Connecticut's Homer D. Babbidge Library, which maintains the Teale papers collection. Nellie remained at Trail Wood for the rest of her life. She died of colon cancer on July 18, 1993, at the Abbey Manor Convalescent Home in Windham, Connecticut.
