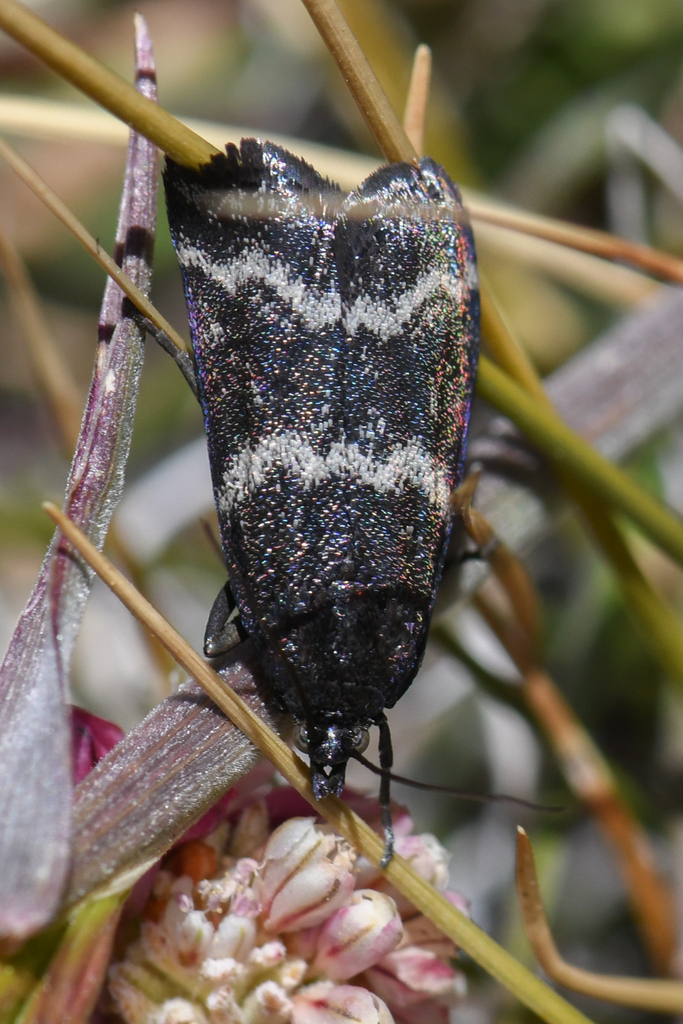

Scientific classification
- Domain: Eukaryota
- Kingdom: Animalia
- Phylum: Arthropoda
- Class: Insecta
- Order: Lepidoptera
- Family: Pyralidae
- Genus: Catastia
- Species: C. bistriatella

Binomial name
- Catastia bistriatella (Hulst, 1895)

Synonyms
- Pyla bistriatella Hulst, 1895

= Catastia bistriatella =

Species of moth

Catastia bistriatella is a species of snout moth in the genus Catastia. It was described by George Duryea Hulst, in 1895. It is found in North America, including California.
