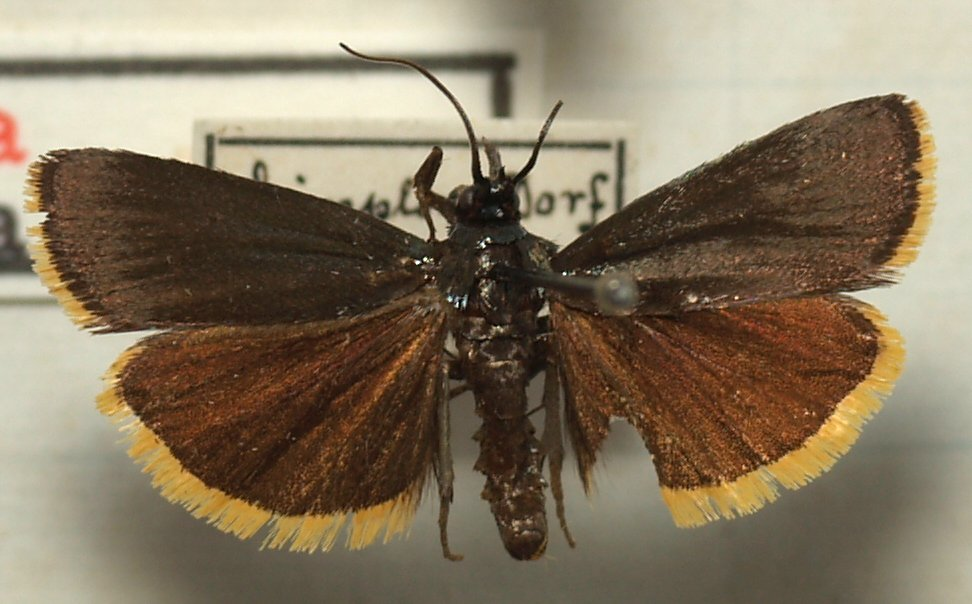
- Catastia marginea

Scientific classification
- Kingdom: Animalia
- Phylum: Arthropoda
- Clade: Pancrustacea
- Class: Insecta
- Order: Lepidoptera
- Family: Pyralidae
- Tribe: Phycitini
- Genus: Catastia; Hübner, 1825

Synonyms
- Diosia Duponchel, 1832

= Catastia =

Genus of moths

Catastia is a genus of snout moths. It was erected by Jacob Hübner in 1825, and is known from Bosnia and Herzegovina, Austria, Italy, and Greece.

== Species ==
- Catastia acraspedella (Staudinger, 1879)
- Catastia actualis (Hulst, 1886)
- Catastia bistriatella (Hulst, 1895)
- Catastia incorruscella (Hulst, 1895)
- Catastia kistrandella Opheim, 1963
- Catastia marginea (Denis & Schiffermüller, 1775)
- Catastia subactualis Neunzig, 2003
- Catastia uniformalis (Hampson, 1903)
