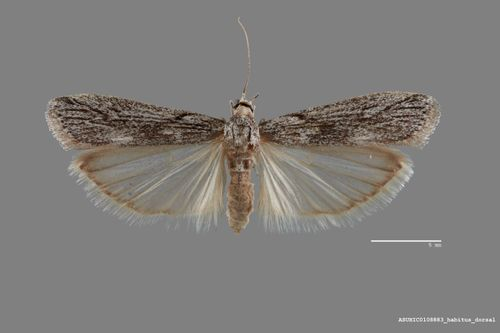

Scientific classification
- Domain: Eukaryota
- Kingdom: Animalia
- Phylum: Arthropoda
- Class: Insecta
- Order: Lepidoptera
- Family: Pyralidae
- Genus: Eumysia
- Species: E. maidella

Binomial name
- Eumysia maidella (Dyar, 1905)

Synonyms
- Yosemitia maidella Dyar, 1905

= Eumysia maidella =

Species of moth

Eumysia maidella is a species of snout moth in the genus Eumysia. It was described by Harrison Gray Dyar Jr. in 1905. It is found in California, United States.
