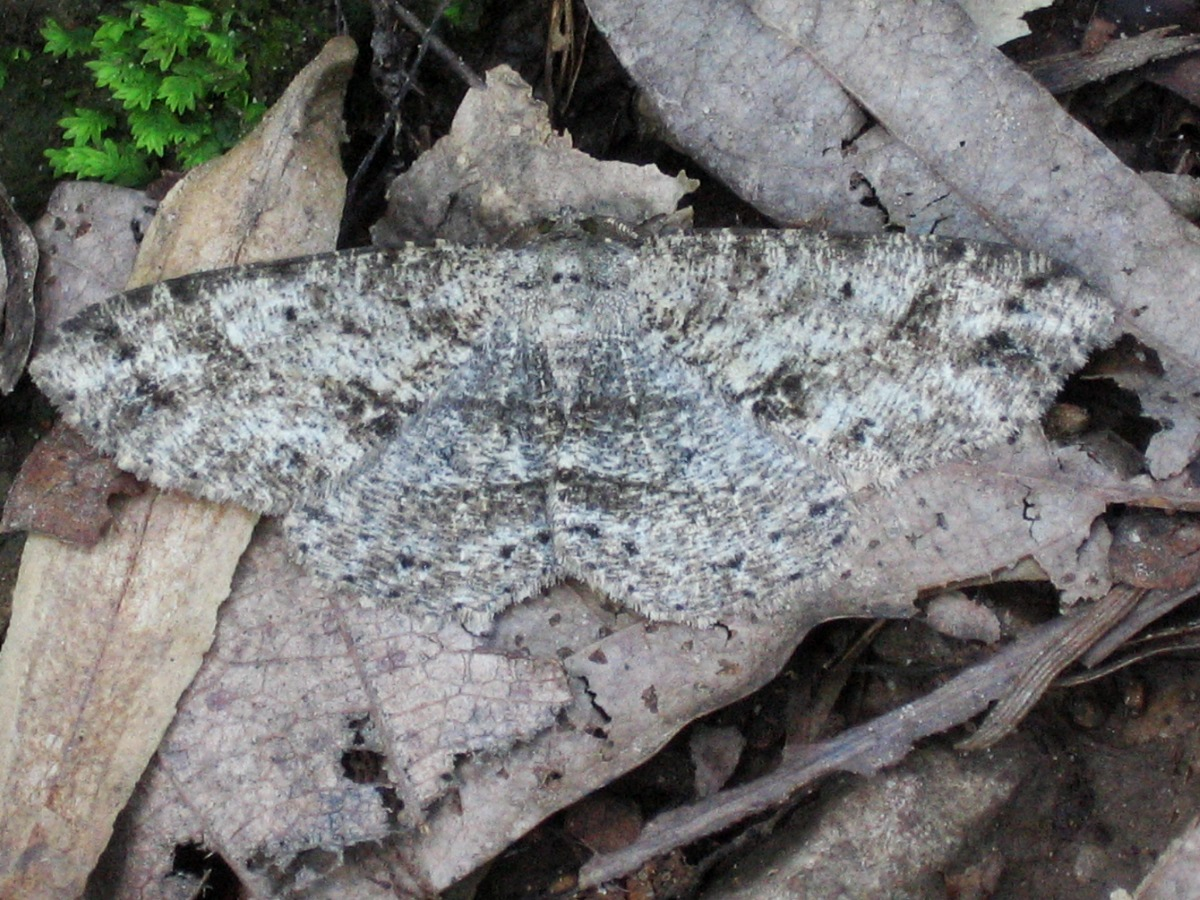

Scientific classification
- Kingdom: Animalia
- Phylum: Arthropoda
- Clade: Pancrustacea
- Class: Insecta
- Order: Lepidoptera
- Family: Geometridae
- Genus: Melanolophia
- Species: M. canadaria

Binomial name
- Melanolophia canadaria (Guenée, 1857)

Synonyms
- Tephrosia canadaria Guenée, 1857; Melanolophia carbonata Cassino & Swett, 1923

= Melanolophia canadaria =

Species of moth

Melanolophia canadaria, the Canadian melanolophia, is a moth of the family Geometridae. The species was first described by Achille Guenée in 1857. They are on wing from March to September in two generations per year and overwinter as larvae.

== Description ==
The wingspan is 30–36 mm. Adults have dark brown or brown mottled wings, all four of which are visible and held open when the moth is at rest. A line across both hindwings which forms a v-shaped dark patch is a distinguishing feature of the species.

== Range and Habitat ==
It is found in North America from Florida to Nova Scotia, west to Saskatchewan and south to Texas. They are most commonly observed in wooded areas and shrublands.

== Ecology ==
The larvae feed on the leaves of Betula, Ulmus, Acer, Quercus, Pinus and Prunus species.

== Subspecies ==
- Melanolophia canadaria crama Rindge, 1964
- Melanolophia canadaria choctawae Rindge, 1964
