= Catastia uniformalis =

Scientific classification
- Kingdom: Animalia
- Phylum: Arthropoda
- Class: Insecta
- Order: Lepidoptera
- Family: Pyralidae
- Genus: Catastia
- Species: C. uniformalis

Binomial name
- Catastia uniformalis (Hampson, 1903)

Synonyms
- Etiella uniformalis Hampson, 1903

Species of moth

Catastia uniformalis is a species of snout moth in the genus Catastia. It was described by George Hampson in 1903. It is found in India.
