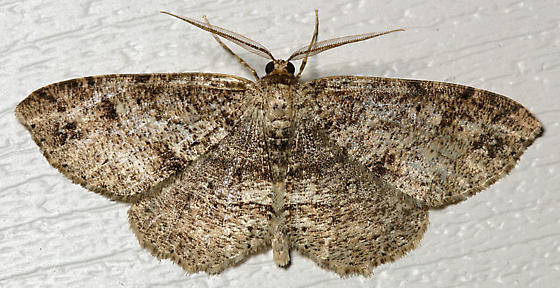

Scientific classification
- Kingdom: Animalia
- Phylum: Arthropoda
- Class: Insecta
- Order: Lepidoptera
- Family: Geometridae
- Genus: Melanolophia
- Species: M. signataria

Binomial name
- Melanolophia signataria (Walker, 1860)

Synonyms
- Melanolophia ejectaria (Walker, 1860); Melanolophia patularia (Walker, 1861)

= Melanolophia signataria =

Species of moth

Melanolophia signataria, the signate melanolophia, is a moth of the family Geometridae. It is found in Nova Scotia to Florida, west to Saskatchewan and East Texas.

The wingspan is 30–35 mm. Adults fly from March to August.

The larvae feed on the leaves of a wide variety of trees, including alder, elm, birch, fir, larch, maple, oak, poplar and spruce.

== Subspecies ==
- Melanolophia signataria signataria
- Melanolophia signataria timucuae (Florida)
