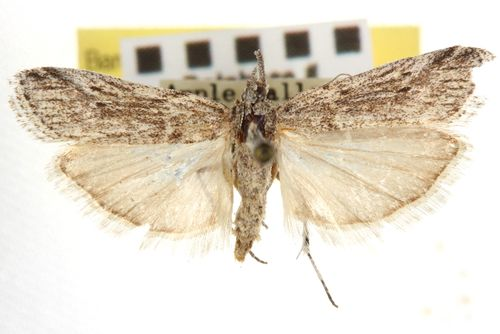

Scientific classification
- Domain: Eukaryota
- Kingdom: Animalia
- Phylum: Arthropoda
- Class: Insecta
- Order: Lepidoptera
- Family: Pyralidae
- Genus: Eumysia
- Species: E. semicana

Binomial name
- Eumysia semicana Heinrich, 1956

= Eumysia semicana =

Species of moth

Eumysia semicana is a species of snout moth in the genus Eumysia. It was described by Carl Heinrich in 1956. It is found in California, United States.
