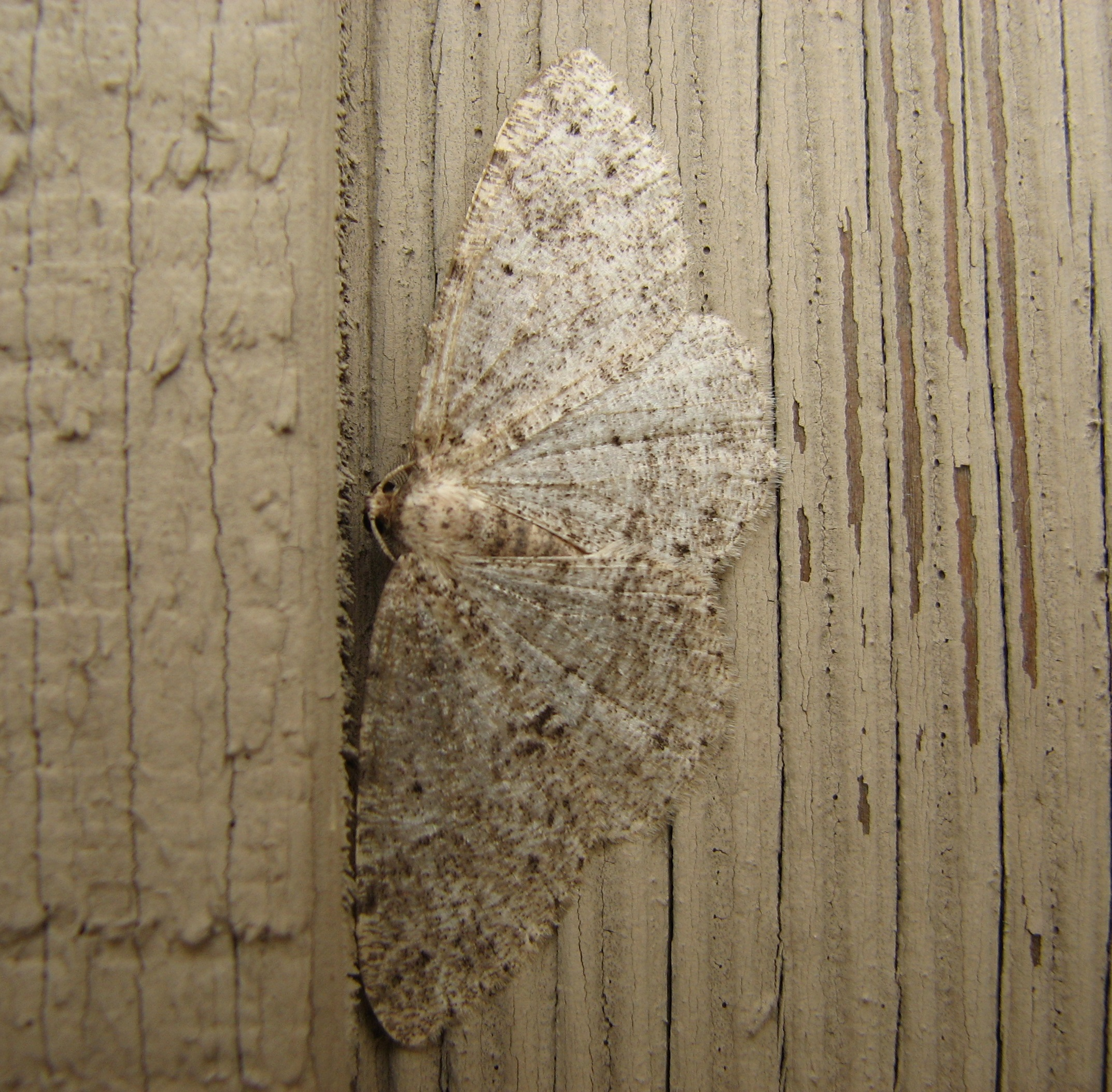

Scientific classification
- Kingdom: Animalia
- Phylum: Arthropoda
- Class: Insecta
- Order: Lepidoptera
- Family: Geometridae
- Genus: Melanolophia
- Species: M. imitata

Binomial name
- Melanolophia imitata (Walker, 1860)

Synonyms
- Melanolophia subgenericata Dyar, 1904; Melanolophia subimitata Forbes, 1948 (nom. nud.); Melanolophia imitata barbara; Melanolophia imitata cana

= Melanolophia imitata =

Species of moth

Melanolophia imitata, the western carpet or green-striped forest looper, is a moth of the family Geometridae. The species was first described by Francis Walker in 1860. It is found in western North America from southern California, north to Alaska and east to extreme south-western Alberta.

The wingspan is 34–40 mm. Adults are on wing from March to June. There is one generation per year.

The larvae feed on the foliage of various conifer trees, but preferring Douglas fir, Tsuga and Abies species.
