= Melanolophia centralis =

Scientific classification
- Kingdom: Animalia
- Phylum: Arthropoda
- Clade: Pancrustacea
- Class: Insecta
- Order: Lepidoptera
- Family: Geometridae
- Tribe: Melanolophiini
- Genus: Melanolophia
- Species: M. centralis

Binomial name
- Melanolophia centralis McDunnough, 1920

Species of moth

Melanolophia centralis is a species of geometrid moth in the family Geometridae. It is found in North America.

The MONA or Hodges number for Melanolophia centralis is 6619.
