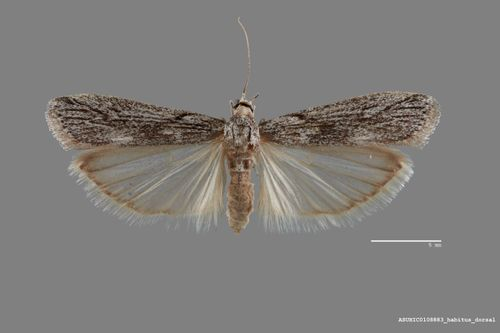
- Eumysia maidella.

Scientific classification
- Kingdom: Animalia
- Phylum: Arthropoda
- Clade: Pancrustacea
- Class: Insecta
- Order: Lepidoptera
- Family: Pyralidae
- Subfamily: Phycitinae
- Genus: Eumysia; Dyar, 1925

= Eumysia =

Genus of moths

Eumysia is a genus of snout moths. It was described by Harrison Gray Dyar Jr. in 1925.

== Species ==
- Eumysia fuscatella (Hulst, 1900)
- Eumysia idahoensis Mackie, 1958
- Eumysia maidella (Dyar, 1905)
- Eumysia mysiella (Dyar, 1905)
- Eumysia pallidipennella (Hulst, 1895)
- Eumysia semicana Heinrich, 1956
