= Melanolophia imperfectaria =

Scientific classification
- Kingdom: Animalia
- Phylum: Arthropoda
- Class: Insecta
- Order: Lepidoptera
- Family: Geometridae
- Tribe: Melanolophiini
- Genus: Melanolophia
- Species: M. imperfectaria

Binomial name
- Melanolophia imperfectaria (Walker, 1860)

Species of moth

Melanolophia imperfectaria is a species of geometrid moth in the family Geometridae. It is found in North America.

The MONA or Hodges number for Melanolophia imperfectaria is 6622.

== Subspecies ==
These two subspecies belong to the species Melanolophia imperfectaria:

- Melanolophia imperfectaria imperfectaria
- Melanolophia imperfectaria solida Rindge, 1964
