= Mericisca scobina =

Scientific classification
- Domain: Eukaryota
- Kingdom: Animalia
- Phylum: Arthropoda
- Class: Insecta
- Order: Lepidoptera
- Family: Geometridae
- Tribe: Boarmiini
- Genus: Mericisca
- Species: M. scobina

Binomial name
- Mericisca scobina Rindge, 1958

Species of moth

Mericisca scobina is a species of geometrid moth in the family Geometridae. It is found in North America.

The MONA or Hodges number for Mericisca scobina is 6607.
