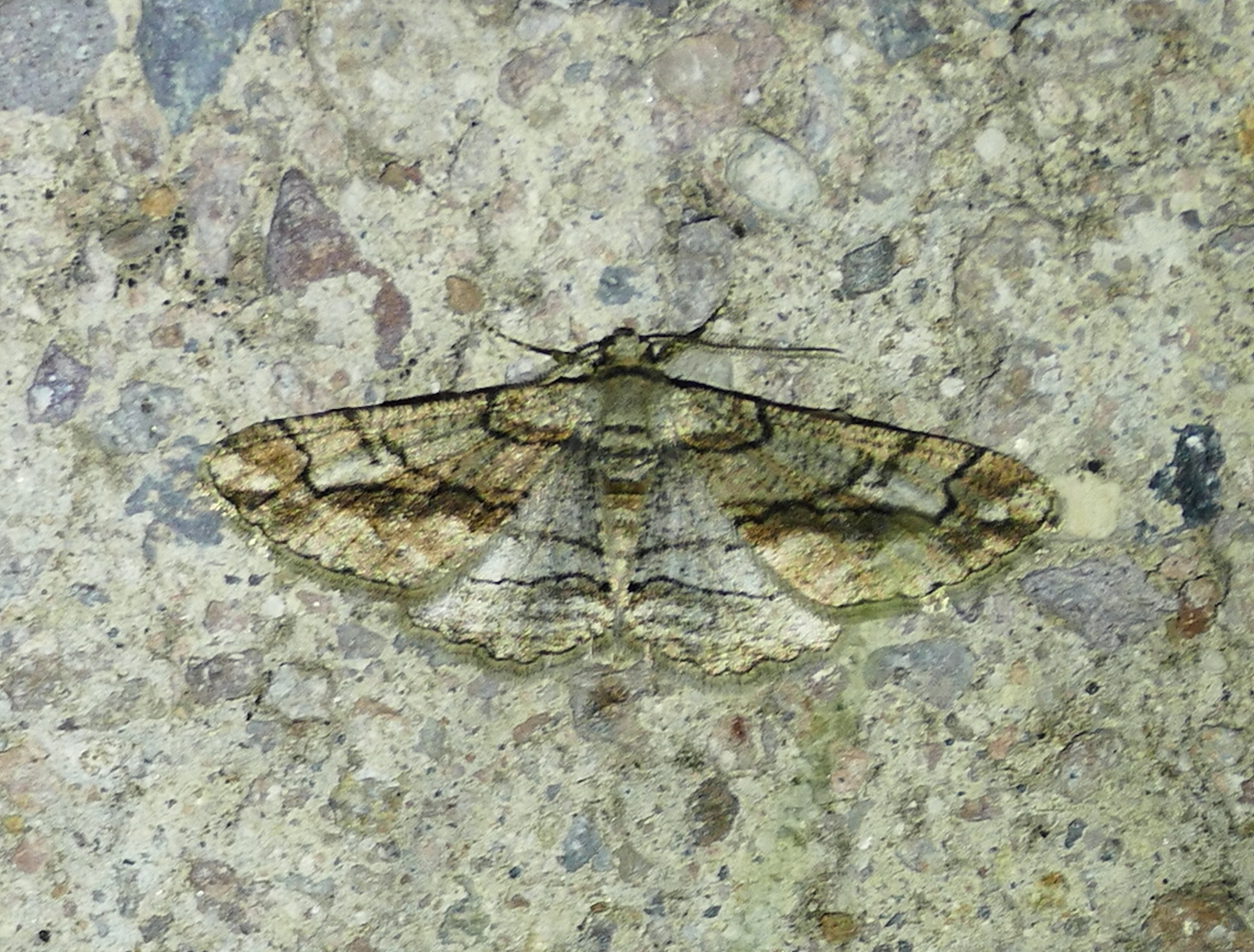
- Parapheromia falsata

Scientific classification
- Kingdom: Animalia
- Phylum: Arthropoda
- Class: Insecta
- Order: Lepidoptera
- Family: Geometridae
- Tribe: Boarmiini
- Genus: Parapheromia

= Parapheromia =

Genus of moths

Parapheromia is a genus of moths in the family Geometridae.

== Species ==
- Parapheromia cassinoi
- Parapheromia falsata
- Parapheromia configurata
- Parapheromia lichenaria
- Parapheromia ficta
