= Mericisca =

Scientific classification
- Kingdom: Animalia
- Phylum: Arthropoda
- Class: Insecta
- Order: Lepidoptera
- Family: Geometridae
- Tribe: Boarmiini
- Genus: Mericisca

Genus of moths

Mericisca is a genus of moths in the family Geometridae.

== Species ==
- Mericisca gracea
- Mericisca scobina
- Mericisca perpictaria
