= Edwin Way Teale =

American naturalist, photographer & writer (1899-1980)

- Teale in 1976
- Born: June 2, 1899; Joliet, Illinois, United States
- Died: October 18, 1980 (aged 81)
- Occupations: Naturalist, author, photographer
- Spouse: Nellie Donovan (m. 1923)
- Children: 1
- Writing career
- Period: 1930–1980
- Genre: Natural history
- Subject: Nature

Edwin Way Teale (June 2, 1899 - October 18, 1980) was an American naturalist, photographer and writer. Teale's works serve as primary source material documenting environmental conditions across North America from 1930–1980. He is perhaps best known for his series The American Seasons, four books documenting over 75,000 miles (121,000 km) of automobile travel across North America following the changing seasons.

== Early years and education ==
Born Edwin Alfred Teale in Joliet, Illinois, to Oliver Cromwell Teale and Clara Louise (Way) Teale, his interest in the natural world was fostered by childhood summers spent at his grandparents' "Lone Oak" farm in Indiana's dune country—experiences recalled in his book Dune Boy (1943). At the age of nine, Teale declared himself a naturalist and at 12 changed his name to Edwin Way Teale.

He received a B.A. from Earlham College in English literature in 1922, then took a job at Friends University in Wichita, Kansas. Teale taught at Friends from 1922–1924 and served as men's and women's debate coach, yearbook adviser and chairman of the campus Peace Contest. In 1923 he married Nellie Imogene Donovan, also on the Friends faculty, whom he had met while at Earlham College.

In 1924, Edwin and Nellie moved to New York City so Edwin could pursue his education at Columbia University. Teale chose Columbia in part

... because it was in New York and it wouldn't take two months to get a manuscript back from a magazine.

In 1926 he received his Master of Arts degree from Columbia University.

== Career ==
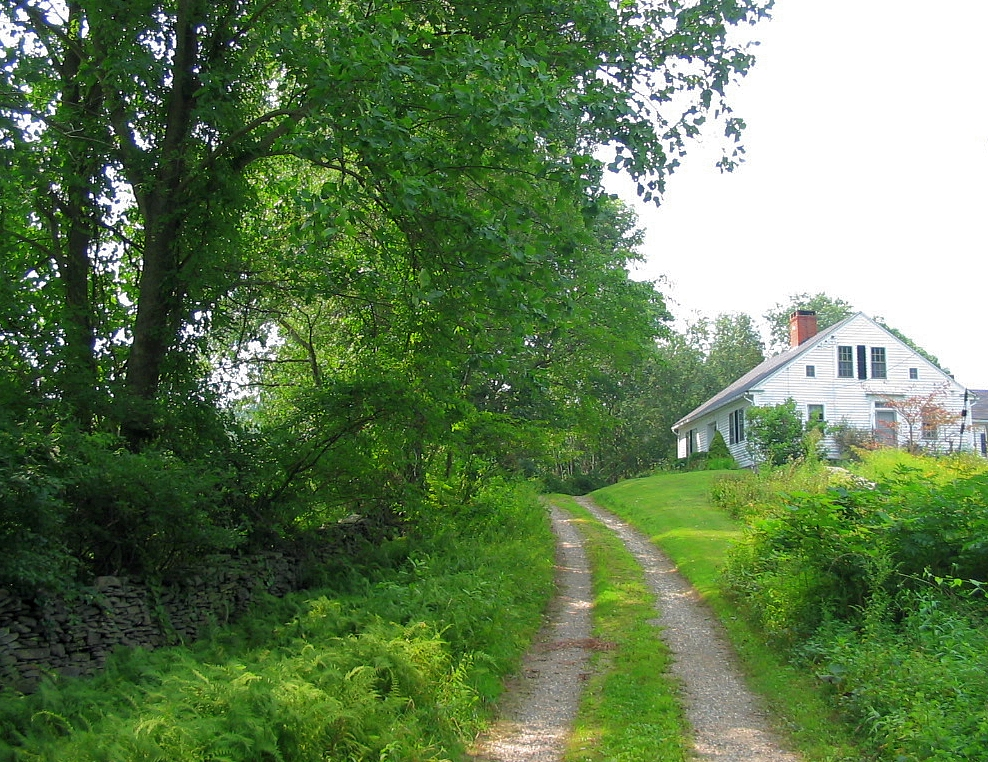
Trail Wood, Teale's home near Hampton, Connecticut, 2004

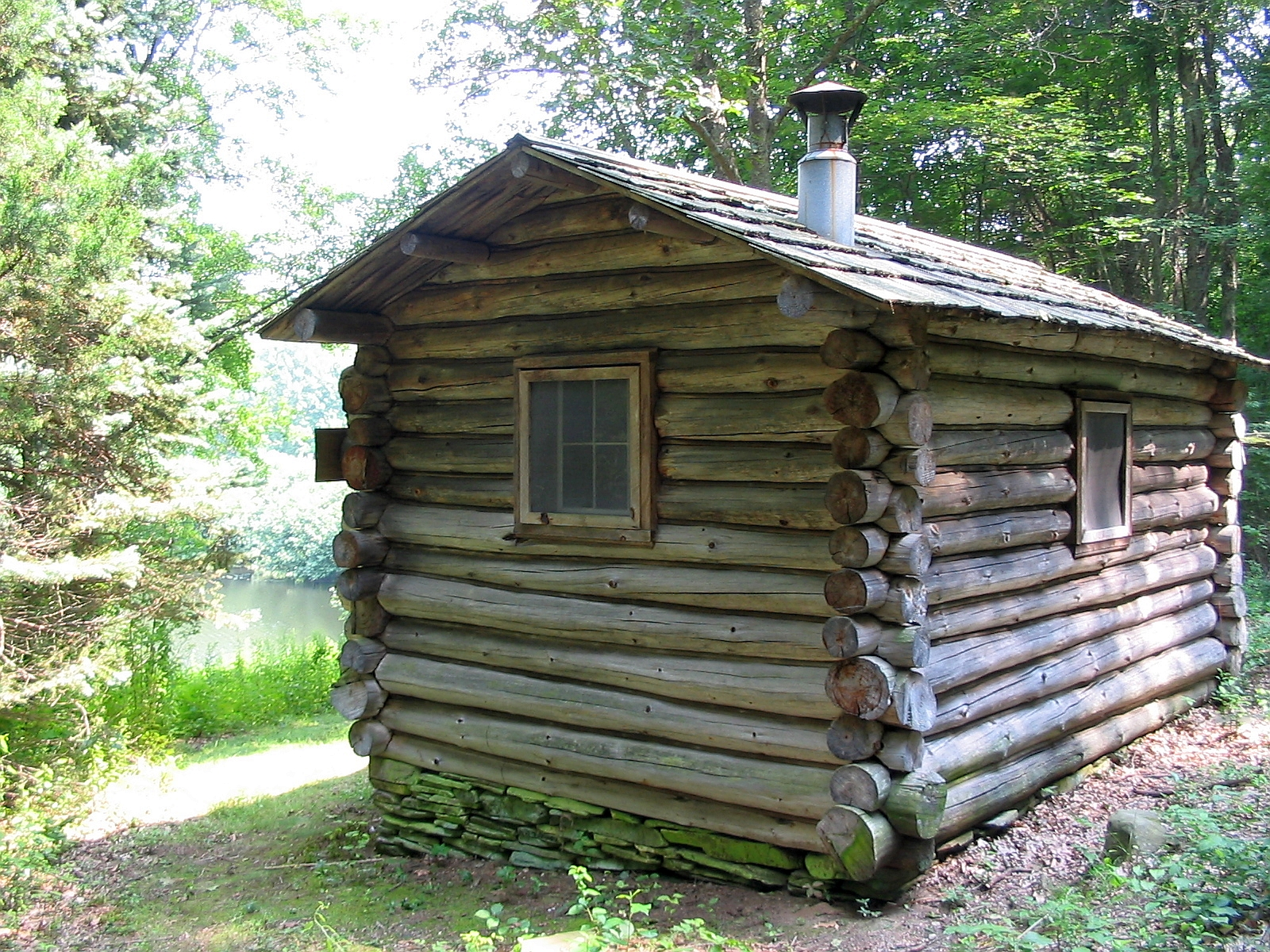
Teale's writing cabin at Trail Wood near Hampton, Connecticut, 2004

In New York, Teale spent 13 years in his first full-time writing job, as a staff writer for Popular Science, working on a wide variety of assignments. In 1937, Teale's first photographic nature study, Grassroots Jungle, was published from among 200 of Teale's insect photographs, many of which were taken on a 4-acre (1.6 ha) plot of land near his home on Park Avenue in Baldwin, Long Island This was followed, in 1941, by The Golden Throng, a combination of text and photographs on bees.

At the age of 42, Teale left Popular Science to become a freelance photographer and nature writer.

In 1942 he wrote Byways to Adventure: A Guide to Nature Hobbies as well as Near Horizons, which received the 1943 John Burroughs Medal for distinguished natural history writing.

In March 1945 Edwin's son David was killed in action in Germany. The Teales began a series of trips across the country, in part to deal with their grief. That same year, Lost Woods was published and received positive reviews.

On February 14, 1947, the Teales set off in their black Buick for a 17,000-mile (27,000 km) roadtrip. They headed first to the Florida Everglades, then zigzagged northward following the advance of spring. Teale wrote about the adventure in North with the Spring. The book was followed by three others on the North American seasons: Journey Into Summer, Autumn Across America, and Wandering Through Winter, which won the Pulitzer Prize for General Nonfiction in 1966.

Teale served as president of the New York Entomological Society from 1944–1949 and the Brooklyn Entomological Society (later incorporated into the New York Entomological Society) from 1949–1953.

Teale worked as a co-writer for a segment titled "Vernal Equinox" on the March 20, 1955 episode of Omnibus, a TV-Radio Workshop of the Ford Foundation produced by Robert Saudek and hosted by Alistair Cooke on the CBS Television Network.

Teale became president of the Thoreau Society in 1958, the same year that Autumn Across America was presented to the White House Library. He received an Indiana Author's Day award in 1960 and the Doctor of Humane Letters (LHD) honorary degree from Indiana University in 1970. Earlham College honored Teale with an Honorary Doctor of Letters degree.

In 1959, the Teales left the increasing suburbanization of their Long Island home for a 130-acre (53 ha) farm in Hampton, Connecticut, which they named "Trail Wood", and which Teale chronicled in A Naturalist Buys an Old Farm (1974). The property was further described in A Walk through the Year (1978). Situated next to the Natchaug State Forest, Trail Wood is now managed as a nature preserve by the Connecticut Audubon Society.

In 1975, Teale received the Ecology Award from the Massachusetts Horticultural Society and the Conservation Medal from the New England Wildflower Society.

Teale was an elected fellow of the American Association for the Advancement of Science and the New York Academy of Sciences, and an associate of the Royal Photographic Society.

== Death ==
In 1980 while working with author Ann Zwinger on the book A Conscious Stillness: Two Naturalists on Thoreau's Rivers, Teale died. Teale's portion of the book was nearly complete at the time of his death, and he was included as co-author when the book was published in 1982. Nellie Teale died in July, 1993 at the age of 92.

== Recognition ==
In 2009, the Indiana Historical Bureau installed a historic marker in Porter County, Indiana, near Teale's grandparents’ farm where he spent summers. Teale wrote that his interest in nature was inspired during his stays at the farm.

== Archives ==
University of Connecticut library director John P. McDonald's longstanding friendship with Teale was instrumental in the eventual addition of many of Teale's papers to UConn's special collections.

Teale's papers consume 238 feet (73 m) in the University of Connecticut Archives & Special Collections at the Thomas J. Dodd Research Center in Storrs, Connecticut and include:

... field notes and drafts for each of his books, early childhood writings, professional writings for magazines, newspapers and book reviews, correspondence- both personal and professional, personal and family documents, scrapbooks, and memorabilia, as well as his photographs (prints, negatives, and transparencies) and his personal library. There is also one box of original John Burroughs material Teale collected over the years.

Teale's last will and testament of September, 1980, bequested to The Concord Free Public Library, Concord, Massachusetts, his

... collection of Henry Thoreau books, letters, correspondence, momentos [sic] and any other material dealing with Henry Thoreau, all ... material dealing with Ralph Waldo Emerson and all other material ... dealing with or relating to Concord, Massachusetts. The collection consumes 16.9 feet (5.2 m) including 12 containers, plus 108 printed books and pamphlets.

== Bibliography ==
- The Book of Gliders (1930)
- Grassroot Jungles (1937)
- The Boys' Book of Insects (1939)
- The Boys' Book of Photography (1939)
- The Golden Throng (1940)
- Byways to Adventure: A Guide to Nature Hobbies (1942)
- Near Horizons (1942)
- Dune Boy: The Early Years of a Naturalist (1943)
- The Lost Woods (1945)
- Walden – Introduction, commentary, photographs (1946)
- Days without Time (1948)
- The Insect World of J. Henri Fabre (1949)
- Green Mansions – Introduction, captions (1949)
- North With The Spring: A Naturalist's Record of a 17,000 Mile Journey with the North American Spring (1951)
- Green Treasury (1952)
- Circle of the Seasons (1953)
- The Junior Book of Insects (1953)
- Exploring The Insect World With Edwin Way Teale (1953)
- The Wilderness World of John Muir (1954)
- Omnibus III vol. 23 / TV-Radio Workshop of the Ford Foundation /CBS Television Network (1955)
- Insect Friends (1955)
- Autumn Across America: A Naturalist's Record of a 20,000 Mile Journey through the North American Autumn (1956)
- Adventures In Nature (1959)
- Journey Into Summer: A Naturalist's Record of a 19,000 Mile Journey Through the North American Summer (1960)
- The Lost Dog, (1961)
- The Bees adapted from material by Edwin Way Teale (1961)
- The Strange Lives of Familiar Insects (1962)
- The Thoughts of Thoreau (1962)
- Audubon's Wildlife: With Selections from the Writings of John James Audubon Editor (1964)
- Wandering Through Winter: A Naturalist's Record of a 20,000 Mile Journey Through the North American Winter (1965)
- Springtime in Britain: An 11,000 Mile Journey Through the Natural History of Britain from Land's End to John O'Groats (1970)
- Photographs of American Nature (1972)
- A Naturalist Buys An Old Farm (1974)
- The American Seasons (1976)
- A Walk through the Year (1978)
- A Conscious Stillness: Two Naturalists on Thoreau's Rivers (1982, published posthumously)

Books About Edwin Way Teale

- Of Nature Time And Teale: A Biographical Sketch of Edwin Way Teale by Edward H. Dodd Jr., Dodd, Mead, & Company, New York, 1960.
