= Eufernaldia sinaloellus =

Scientific classification
- Domain: Eukaryota
- Kingdom: Animalia
- Phylum: Arthropoda
- Class: Insecta
- Order: Lepidoptera
- Family: Crambidae
- Subfamily: Crambinae
- Tribe: Ancylolomiini
- Genus: Eufernaldia
- Species: E. sinaloellus

Binomial name
- Eufernaldia sinaloellus (Schaus, 1922)

Synonyms
- Crambus sinaloellus Schaus, 1922; Crambus sinaolellus Bleszynski & Collins, 1962

Species of moth

Eufernaldia sinaloellus is a moth in the family Crambidae. It was described by Schaus in 1922. It is found in Mexico.
