= Eufernaldia cadarellus =

Scientific classification
- Kingdom: Animalia
- Phylum: Arthropoda
- Class: Insecta
- Order: Lepidoptera
- Family: Crambidae
- Subfamily: Crambinae
- Tribe: Ancylolomiini
- Genus: Eufernaldia
- Species: E. cadarellus

Binomial name
- Eufernaldia cadarellus (H. Druce, 1896)

Synonyms
- Crambus cadarellus H. Druce, 1896; Eufernaldia argenteonervella Hulst, 1900

Species of moth

Eufernaldia cadarellus is a moth in the family Crambidae. It was described by Herbert Druce in 1896. It has been found in Mexico and the US states of Arizona, Texas and Utah.

The wingspan of the moth is about 18 mm. Its forewings are pale straw in color with silvery-white veins; the hindwings are uniform grayish, with an outer margin edged with yellowish fawn. Adults are on wing from May to July and in September.
