= Eumysia idahoensis =

Scientific classification
- Domain: Eukaryota
- Kingdom: Animalia
- Phylum: Arthropoda
- Class: Insecta
- Order: Lepidoptera
- Family: Pyralidae
- Genus: Eumysia
- Species: E. idahoensis

Binomial name
- Eumysia idahoensis Mackie, 1958

Species of moth

Eumysia idahoensis is a species of snout moth in the genus Eumysia. It was described by Mackie in 1958. It is found in California, United States.
