= Wandering Through Winter =

1965 non-fiction travelogue by Edwin Way Teale

- First edition cover
- Author: Edwin Way Teale
- Publisher: Dodd, Mead and Company
- Publication date: 1965
- Media type: Print
- Awards: 1966 Pulitzer Prize for General Nonfiction
- Dewey Decimal: 500.9
- LC Class: QH104

Wandering Through Winter: A Naturalist's Record of a 20,000-Mile Journey Through the North American Winter is a nonfiction book written by Edwin Way Teale, published in 1965 by Dodd, Mead and Company. It won the 1966 Pulitzer Prize for General Nonfiction. The book was republished in 1990 by St Martin's Press.

This book documents the travels of a naturalist and his wife, Nellie I. Teale, who spent four winter months traveling twenty thousand miles across the southwestern United States and parts of the Midwest. The trip ended in northeastern Maine. The book includes reports on the people, plants, animals, and birds they encountered. It is the final volume in Teale's natural history of the four seasons in North America, a 76,000-mile journey over 15 years, with the other volumes being North with the Spring, Journey Into Summer, and Autumn Across America.
