= Catastia subactualis =

Scientific classification
- Domain: Eukaryota
- Kingdom: Animalia
- Phylum: Arthropoda
- Class: Insecta
- Order: Lepidoptera
- Family: Pyralidae
- Genus: Catastia
- Species: C. subactualis

Binomial name
- Catastia subactualis Neunzig, 2003

Species of moth

Catastia subactualis is a species of snout moth in the genus Catastia. It was described by Herbert H. Neunzig in 2003 and is found in the US state of California.
