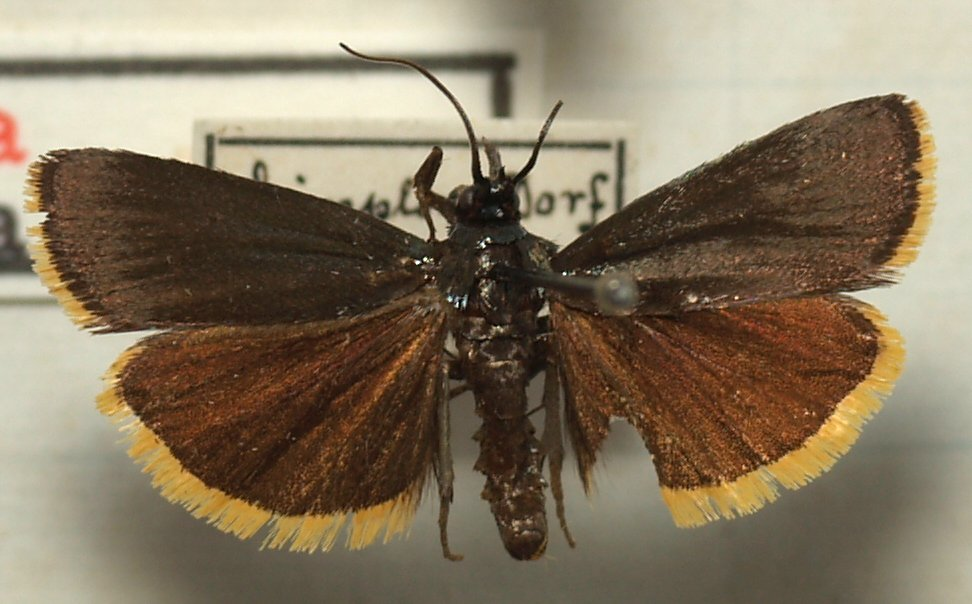

Scientific classification
- Domain: Eukaryota
- Kingdom: Animalia
- Phylum: Arthropoda
- Class: Insecta
- Order: Lepidoptera
- Family: Pyralidae
- Genus: Catastia
- Species: C. marginea

Binomial name
- Catastia marginea (Denis & Schiffermüller, 1775)

Synonyms
- Tinea auriciliella auriciliella Hübner, 1813; Phycis auricella Zetterstedt, 1839; Catastia marginea var. auriciliella ab. intermedia Weber, 1936; Catastia marginea var. auriciliella ab. pseudomarginea Weber, 1936; Catastia marginea f. orcusella Schawerda, 1908; Catastia pindosella Roesler, 1969; Phalaena atrella Fabricius, 1793; Phycis antiopella Zincken, 1818

= Catastia marginea =

Species of moth

Catastia marginea is a moth of the family Pyralidae. It was described by Michael Denis and Ignaz Schiffermüller in 1775 and is found in northern and central Europe and eastwards through Russia.

The wingspan is 20–22 mm.

The larva probably feed on Alchemilla vulgaris and Potentilla
