= Eufernaldia panamella =

Scientific classification
- Domain: Eukaryota
- Kingdom: Animalia
- Phylum: Arthropoda
- Class: Insecta
- Order: Lepidoptera
- Family: Crambidae
- Subfamily: Crambinae
- Tribe: Ancylolomiini
- Genus: Eufernaldia
- Species: E. panamella

Binomial name
- Eufernaldia panamella Schaus, 1922

Species of moth

Eufernaldia panamella is a moth in the family Crambidae. It was described by Schaus in 1922. It is found in Panama.
