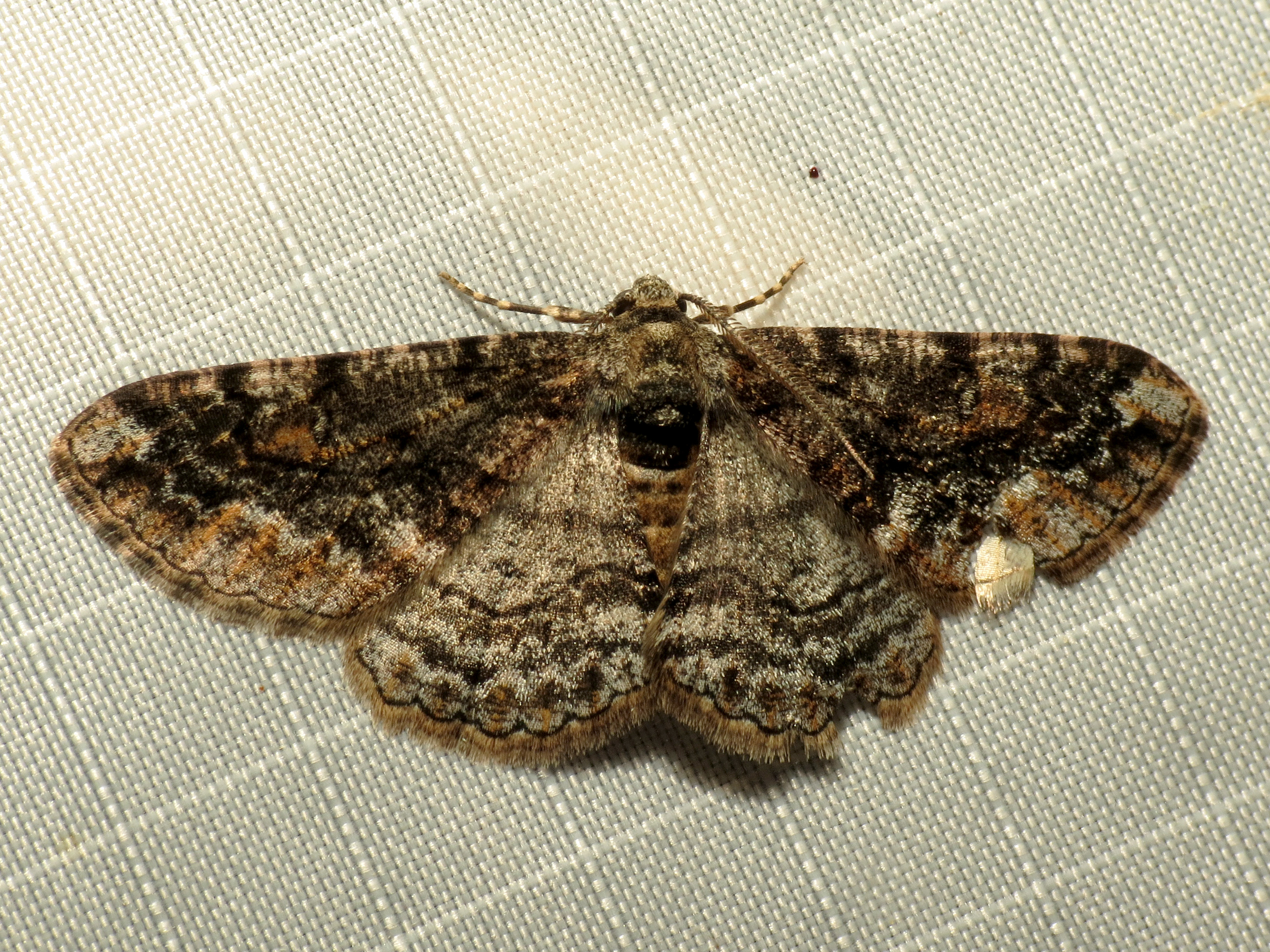

Scientific classification
- Domain: Eukaryota
- Kingdom: Animalia
- Phylum: Arthropoda
- Class: Insecta
- Order: Lepidoptera
- Family: Geometridae
- Genus: Parapheromia
- Species: P. cassinoi

Binomial name
- Parapheromia cassinoi McDunnough, 1927

= Parapheromia cassinoi =

Species of moth

Parapheromia cassinoi is a species of geometrid moth in the family Geometridae. It is found in North America.

The MONA or Hodges number for Parapheromia cassinoi is 6608.
