= Mericisca perpictaria =

Scientific classification
- Domain: Eukaryota
- Kingdom: Animalia
- Phylum: Arthropoda
- Class: Insecta
- Order: Lepidoptera
- Family: Geometridae
- Genus: Mericisca
- Species: M. perpictaria

Binomial name
- Mericisca perpictaria (Barnes & McDunnough, 1916)

Species of moth

Mericisca perpictaria is a species of moth in the family Geometridae first described by William Barnes and James Halliday McDunnough in 1916. It is found in North America.

The MONA or Hodges number for Mericisca perpictaria is 6606.
