= Eufernaldia misgabellus =

Scientific classification
- Domain: Eukaryota
- Kingdom: Animalia
- Phylum: Arthropoda
- Class: Insecta
- Order: Lepidoptera
- Family: Crambidae
- Subfamily: Crambinae
- Tribe: Ancylolomiini
- Genus: Eufernaldia
- Species: E. misgabellus

Binomial name
- Eufernaldia misgabellus (H. Druce, 1896)

Synonyms
- Crambus misgabellus H. Druce, 1896

Species of moth

Eufernaldia misgabellus is a moth in the family Crambidae. It was described by Herbert Druce in 1896. It is found in Mexico.
