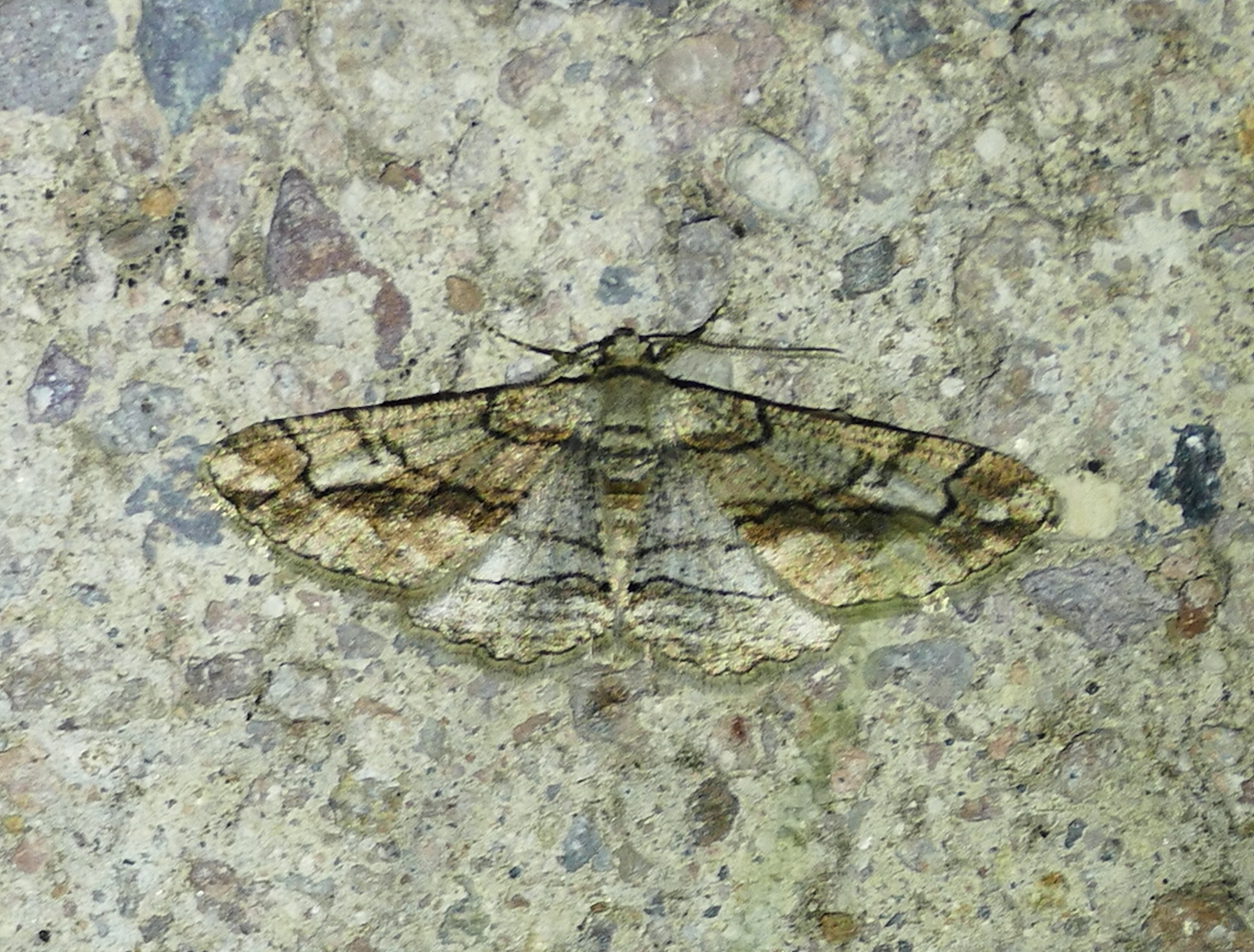

Scientific classification
- Kingdom: Animalia
- Phylum: Arthropoda
- Class: Insecta
- Order: Lepidoptera
- Family: Geometridae
- Genus: Parapheromia
- Species: P. falsata

Binomial name
- Parapheromia falsata McDunnough, 1920

= Parapheromia falsata =

Species of moth

Parapheromia falsata is a species of geometrid moth in the family Geometridae. It is found in North America and Oceania.

The MONA or Hodges number for Parapheromia falsata is 6612.
