= Parapheromia lichenaria =

Scientific classification
- Domain: Eukaryota
- Kingdom: Animalia
- Phylum: Arthropoda
- Class: Insecta
- Order: Lepidoptera
- Family: Geometridae
- Tribe: Boarmiini
- Genus: Parapheromia
- Species: P. lichenaria

Binomial name
- Parapheromia lichenaria (Pearsall, 1906)

Species of moth

Parapheromia lichenaria is a species of geometrid moth in the family Geometridae. It is found in North America.

The MONA or Hodges number for Parapheromia lichenaria is 6609.
