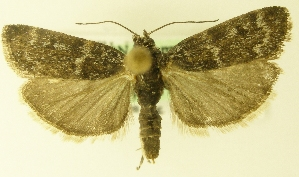

Scientific classification
- Domain: Eukaryota
- Kingdom: Animalia
- Phylum: Arthropoda
- Class: Insecta
- Order: Lepidoptera
- Family: Pyralidae
- Genus: Catastia
- Species: C. kistrandella

Binomial name
- Catastia kistrandella Opheim, 1963

= Catastia kistrandella =

Species of moth

Catastia kistrandella is a species of snout moth in the genus Catastia. It was described by Opheim in 1963. It is found in Fennoscandia and northern Russia.

The wingspan is 18–22 mm.
