= Episcythrastis elaphitis =

Scientific classification
- Kingdom: Animalia
- Phylum: Arthropoda
- Class: Insecta
- Order: Lepidoptera
- Family: Pyralidae
- Genus: Episcythrastis
- Species: E. elaphitis

Binomial name
- Episcythrastis elaphitis Meyrick, 1937

Species of moth

Episcythrastis elaphitis is a species of snout moth in the genus Episcythrastis. It was described by Edward Meyrick in 1937, and is known from the Democratic Republic of the Congo.
