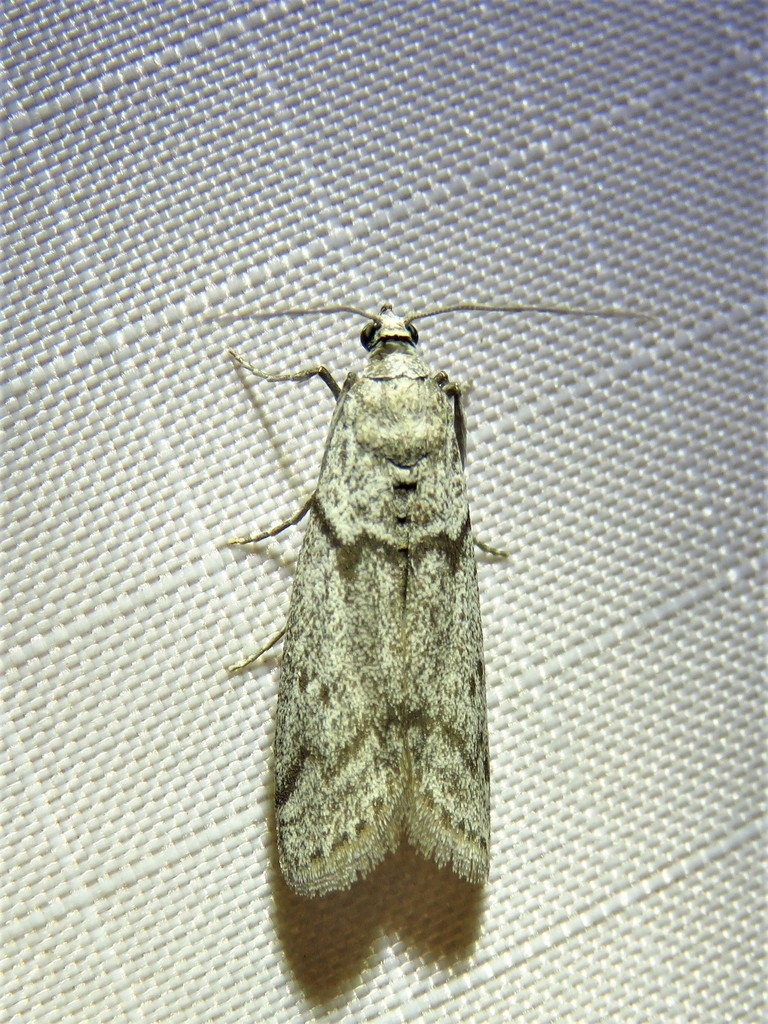

Scientific classification
- Kingdom: Animalia
- Phylum: Arthropoda
- Class: Insecta
- Order: Lepidoptera
- Family: Pyralidae
- Genus: Myelopsis
- Species: M. alatella

Binomial name
- Myelopsis alatella (Hulst, 1887)

Synonyms
- Acrobasis alatella Hulst, 1887; Episcythrastis alatella; Myelois piazzella Dyar, 1925; Myelois rectistrigella Ragonot, 1887; Myelois fragilella Dyar, 1904

= Myelopsis alatella =

Species of moth

Myelopsis alatella is a species of snout moth in the genus Myelopsis. It was described by George Duryea Hulst in 1887 and is known from the south-western United States, mainly California.
