= Parapheromia ficta =

Scientific classification
- Domain: Eukaryota
- Kingdom: Animalia
- Phylum: Arthropoda
- Class: Insecta
- Order: Lepidoptera
- Family: Geometridae
- Tribe: Boarmiini
- Genus: Parapheromia
- Species: P. ficta

Binomial name
- Parapheromia ficta (Rindge, 1972)

Species of moth

Parapheromia ficta is a species of geometrid moth in the family Geometridae. It is found in North America.

The MONA or Hodges number for Parapheromia ficta is 6610.
