= Catastia acraspedella =

Scientific classification
- Domain: Eukaryota
- Kingdom: Animalia
- Phylum: Arthropoda
- Class: Insecta
- Order: Lepidoptera
- Family: Pyralidae
- Genus: Catastia
- Species: C. acraspedella

Binomial name
- Catastia acraspedella Staudinger, 1879

Species of moth

Catastia acraspedella is a species of snout moth in the genus Catastia. It was described by Staudinger in 1879. It is found in Bulgaria.
