= Eumysia mysiella =

Scientific classification
- Kingdom: Animalia
- Phylum: Arthropoda
- Class: Insecta
- Order: Lepidoptera
- Family: Pyralidae
- Genus: Eumysia
- Species: E. mysiella

Binomial name
- Eumysia mysiella (Dyar, 1905)

Synonyms
- Yosemitia mysiella Dyar, 1905

Species of moth

Eumysia mysiella is a species of snout moth. It was described by Harrison Gray Dyar Jr. in 1905. It is found in the US state of California.
