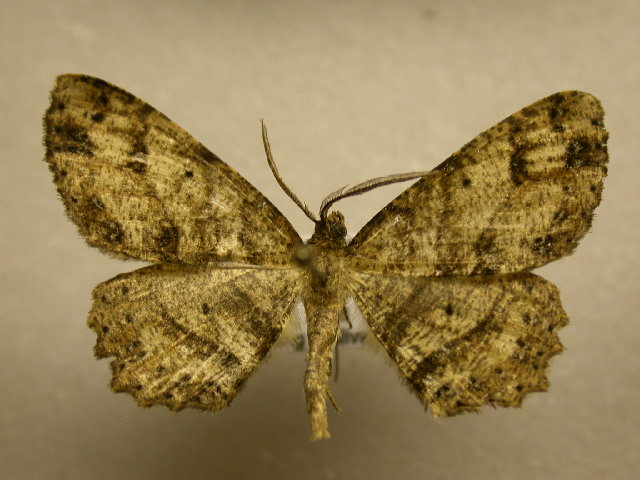

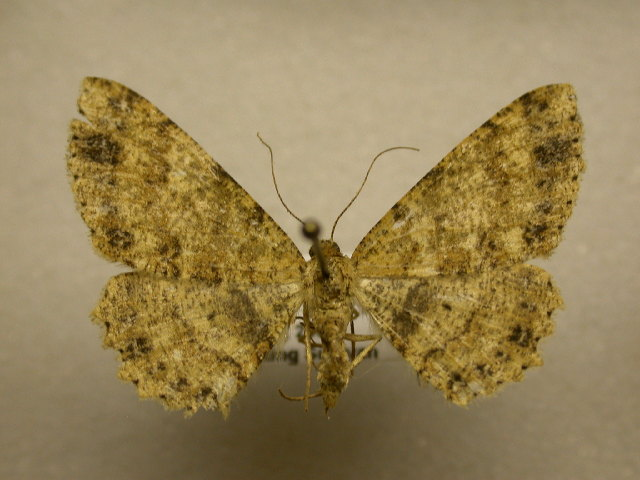

Scientific classification
- Kingdom: Animalia
- Phylum: Arthropoda
- Clade: Pancrustacea
- Class: Insecta
- Order: Lepidoptera
- Family: Geometridae
- Genus: Melanolophia
- Species: M. sadrinaria

Binomial name
- Melanolophia sadrinaria Rindge, 1964

= Melanolophia sadrinaria =

Species of moth

Melanolophia sadrinaria is a moth of the family Geometridae first described by Frederick H. Rindge in 1964. It is found in Costa Rica.
