= Autumn Across America =

1956 non-fiction book by Edwin Way Teale

- Cover of the 1956 Dodd, Mead edition
- Author: Edwin Way Teale
- Language: English
- Publisher: Dodd, Mead
- Publication date: 1956
- Dewey Decimal: 574.973
- LC Class: QH104 .T36

Autumn Across America is a 1956 non-fiction book written by Edwin Way Teale. It is the third book of a four-part book series covering various seasons. The journey in the book starts at the fall of equinox and finishes at the winter solstice of 1952. Kirkus Reviews said of the book, "Those who cherish the memory of North With the Spring will rejoice over this second nature-travel book, capturing autumn in its every phase over the whole breadth of the continent, half the states of the union."
