= Leslie Bassett =

American composer (1923–2016)

Portrait of Bassett

Leslie Raymond Bassett (22 January 1923 – 4 February 2016) was an American composer of classical music. He received the 1966 Pulitzer Prize in Music. He had a lifelong relationship with the University of Michigan School of Music. He received the MM there, and in 1956 was the recipient of the university's first DMA. Bassett was a member of the University of Michigan faculty from 1952 until 1992. Upon retirement from active teaching in 1992, he held the title of Albert A. Stanley Distinguished University Professor Emeritus of Composition until his death in 2016.

== Biography ==
=== Early life and education ===
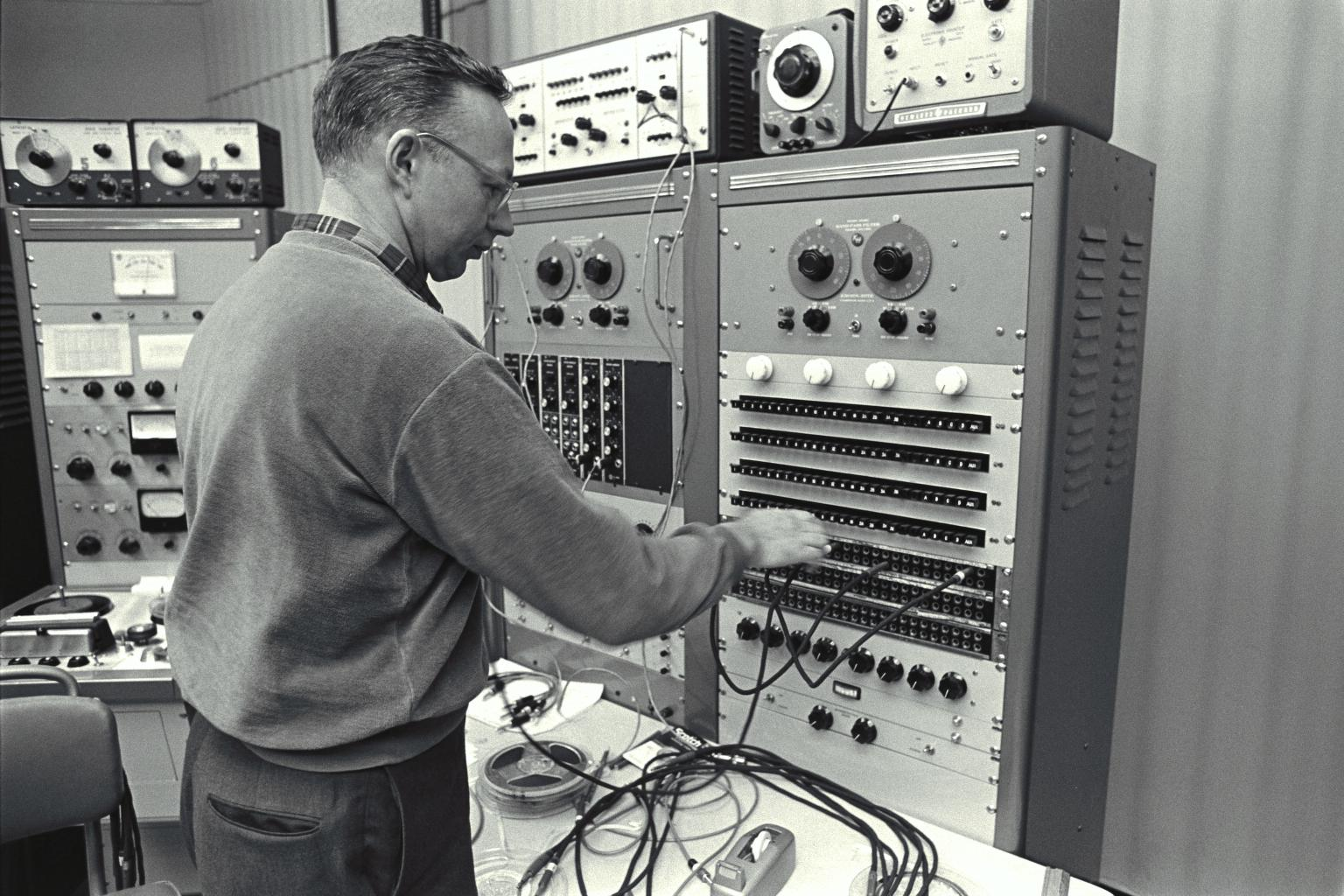
Bassett working in the University of Michigan Electronic Music Studio. No specific date, probably early 1969.

Bassett was born in 1923 in Hanford, California.

He was a member of the Gamma Pi chapter of Phi Mu Alpha Sinfonia at California State University-Fresno, 1942. After studying piano, cello, and trombone, he served in the U.S. military during World War II. He served as a trombonist, composer and arranger with the 13th Armored Division Band.

After his military service, Bassett attended the University of Michigan where he studied composition with Homer Keller and Ross Lee Finney. A Fulbright fellowship in 1950 supported study in Paris at the Ecole Normale de Musique with Arthur Honegger and also with Nadia Boulanger. He went on to teach for more than forty years at the University of Michigan.

=== University of Michigan Career ===
Bassett's compositional and academic career was made largely at the University of Michigan in Ann Arbor. He first joined the U-M faculty in 1952. He chaired the composition department in 1970, and was named Albert A. Stanley Professor in 1977. In 1984, he was named the Henry Russell Lecturer at the University of Michigan, that University's "highest faculty honor." Bassett was a founding member of the U-M electronic music studio, as well as director of the Contemporary Directions Performance Project until his retirement in 1991. At his death, he was the University of Michigan's Albert A. Stanley Distinguished University Professor Emeritus of Composition.

=== Compositional work and achievements ===
Bassett received the Prix de Rome (1961-63) and 1966 Pulitzer Prize for Music for his "Variations for Orchestra". He was also honored with a Distinguished Artist Award from the State of Michigan, two Guggenheim fellowships, a Fulbright fellowship, and honors from the Koussevitzky Foundation and National Endowment for the Arts.

In 1968, Bassett received a grant from the Koussevitzky Foundation, which provided funds for the Sextet for strings and piano, commissioned by the Library of Congress' Koussevitzky commissions program. He was one of 16 composers to receive a commission supported by the National Endowment for the Arts' Bicentennial Commissioning Grant program, which resulted in the premiere of Bassett's "Echoes from an Invisible World" by the Philadelphia Orchestra as part of the Bicentennial.

== See also ==
See: List of music students by teacher: A to B#Leslie Bassett. for notable students.
