= Journals associated with the New York Entomological Society =

The New York Entomological Society and other entomological societies in New York have produced a number of scientific journals since the mid-19th century, some of which have moved between a set of similar societies.

| Year | Brooklyn Entomological Society | | New York Entomological Club | New York Entomological Society |
| 1878 | Bulletin of the Brooklyn Entomological Society (ISSN 1051-8932) volume 1 | | | |
| 1881 | | | Papilio (ISSN 0196-5832) volume 1 | |
| 1884 | | | Ceases publication with volume 4 | |
| 1885 | Ceases publication with volume 7 | | | |
| 1885 | Entomologica Americana (ISSN 0096-3712) volume 1 (formed from Bulletin of the Brooklyn Entomological Society and Papilio) | | | |
| 1890 | Suspends publication with volume 6 | | | |
| 1893 | | | | Journal of the New York Entomological Society (ISSN 0028-7199) volume 1 |
| 1912 | Bulletin of the Brooklyn Entomological Society (new series) (ISSN 1051-8940) resumes with volume 8 | | | |
| 1926 | | Entomologica Americana (new series) resumes publication with volume 7 | | |
| 1966 | Ceases publication with volume 59-60 | | | |
| 1975 | | Ceases publication with volume 49 | | |
| 2006 | | | | Ceases publication with volume 114 |
| 2009–present | | | | Entomologica Americana (ISSN 1947-5136) volume 115 onwards |

== Bulletin of the Brooklyn Entomological Society ==
Bulletin of the Brooklyn Entomological Society
- Discipline: Entomology
- Language: English
- Edited by: Franz G. Schaupp (1878–1884); John Bernhardt Smith (1884–1885); Robert P. Dow (1912–?)

Publication details
- History: 1878–1885, 1912–1966
- Publisher: Brooklyn Entomological Society

Standard abbreviations
- ISO 4: Bull. Brooklyn Entomol. Soc.

Indexing
- Bulletin of the Brooklyn Entomological Society
- ISSN: 1051-8932
- Bulletin of the Brooklyn Entomological Society (new series)
- ISSN: 1051-8940

Links
- Online archive

The Bulletin of the Brooklyn Entomological Society was an academic journal which focused on entomology. It was published by the Brooklyn Entomological Society. In 1885, it was suspended after volume 7, and was merged with Papilio to form Entomologica Americana.

The journal was later resumed in 1912, as Bulletin of the Brooklyn Entomological Society (new series), starting at Volume 8. It then ceased publication with the double volume 59-60 in June 1966, shortly before the Brooklyn Entomological Society merged with the New York Entomological Society.

== Papilio (New York Entomological Club) ==
Papilio
- Discipline: Entomology
- Language: English
- Edited by: Henry Edwards (1881–1883); Eugene M. Aaron (1884)

Publication details
- History: 1881–1884
- Publisher: New York Entomological Club (1881–1882); Henry Edwards (1883); Eugene M. Aaron (1884)

Standard abbreviations
- ISO 4: Papilio

Indexing
- ISSN: 0196-5832
- OCLC no.: 1643284

Links
- Online archive

Papilio, or Papilio: The Organ of the New York Entomological Club, was an academic journal which focused on entomology. It was named after the swallowtail butterfly genus Papilio, and was entirely devoted to Lepidoptera (butterflies and moths).

The first two volumes of Papilio were published by the New York Entomological Club between 1881 and 1882, with Henry Edwards as the editor. After the society's activities ceased in 1882, two more volumes were published: the third volume was published in 1883 by Henry Edwards, who was both the editor and publisher of the journal at the time, and the fourth volume was published instead by Eugene M. Aaron, with George B. Cresson as "Entomological Printer".

After the fourth volume, the journal ceased publication due to expenses exceeding income from subscriptions. It was merged with the Bulletin of the Brooklyn Entomological Society to form Entomologica Americana.

== Entomologica Americana (Brooklyn Entomological Society) ==
Entomologica Americana
- Discipline: Entomology
- Language: English

Publication details
- History: 1885–1890, 1925–1964, 1969–1975
- Publisher: Brooklyn Entomological Society (1885–1964); New York Entomological Society (1969–1975)

Standard abbreviations
- ISO 4: Entomol. Am.

Indexing
- ISSN: 0096-3712

Links
- Online archive

Entomologica Americana was an academic journal which focused on entomology, published irregularly from 1885 to 1975. It was created as a merger of the previous Bulletin of the Brooklyn Entomological Society and Papilio journals, though the former would resume publication later on in a new series.

First published by the Brooklyn Entomological Society in 1885, publication of Entomologica Americana was suspended in 1890 after six volumes. It was then resumed in 1926, serving as a place for longer papers (such as monographs) to be published in, but was again suspended in 1964 after Volume 44.

After the Brooklyn Entomological Society was merged with the New York Entomological Society, publication of Entomologica Americana was resumed again in 1969 with Volume 45. The journal now ran concurrently with the society's existing journal, the Journal of the New York Entomological Society, and was again used for publishing longer papers, while Journal was used for shorter papers. Entomologica Americana finally ceased publication in 1975 after Volume 49.

The name "Entomologica Americana" was later revived in 2009 for the journal Entomologica Americana, which succeeded the Journal of the New York Entomological Society.

== Journal of the New York Entomological Society ==
Journal of the New York Entomological Society
- Discipline: Entomology
- Language: English

Publication details
- History: 1893–2006
- Publisher: New York Entomological Society

Standard abbreviations
- ISO 4: J. N. Y. Entomol. Soc.

Indexing
- ISSN: 0028-7199 (print); 1937-2361 (web)
- JSTOR: 00287199

Links
- Journal homepage; Archive (1893–1999)

The Journal of the New York Entomological Society was an academic journal which focused on entomology. It was first published by the New York Entomological Society in 1893. It ceased publishing in 2006. In 2009 it was relaunched as Entomologica Americana.

== Entomologica Americana (New York Entomological Society) ==
Entomologica Americana
- Discipline: Entomology
- Language: English

Publication details
- Former name: Journal of the New York Entomological Society
- History: 2009–present
- Publisher: New York Entomological Society

Standard abbreviations
- ISO 4: Entomol. Am. (N. Y.)

Indexing
- ISSN: 1947-5136 (print); 1947-5144 (web)
- JSTOR: 19475136

Links
- Journal homepage; Allen Press site (2015–present)

The Entomologica Americana is a peer-reviewed academic journal which focuses on entomology. It is published by BioOne for the New York Entomological Society. It shares the same name as the earlier Entomologica Americana journal originally published by the Brooklyn Entomological Society.

== Covers ==
Bulletin of the Brooklyn Entomological Society

Entomologica Americana (1961 cover)

Journal of the New York Entomological Society

Entomologica Americana (New York Entomological Society)
