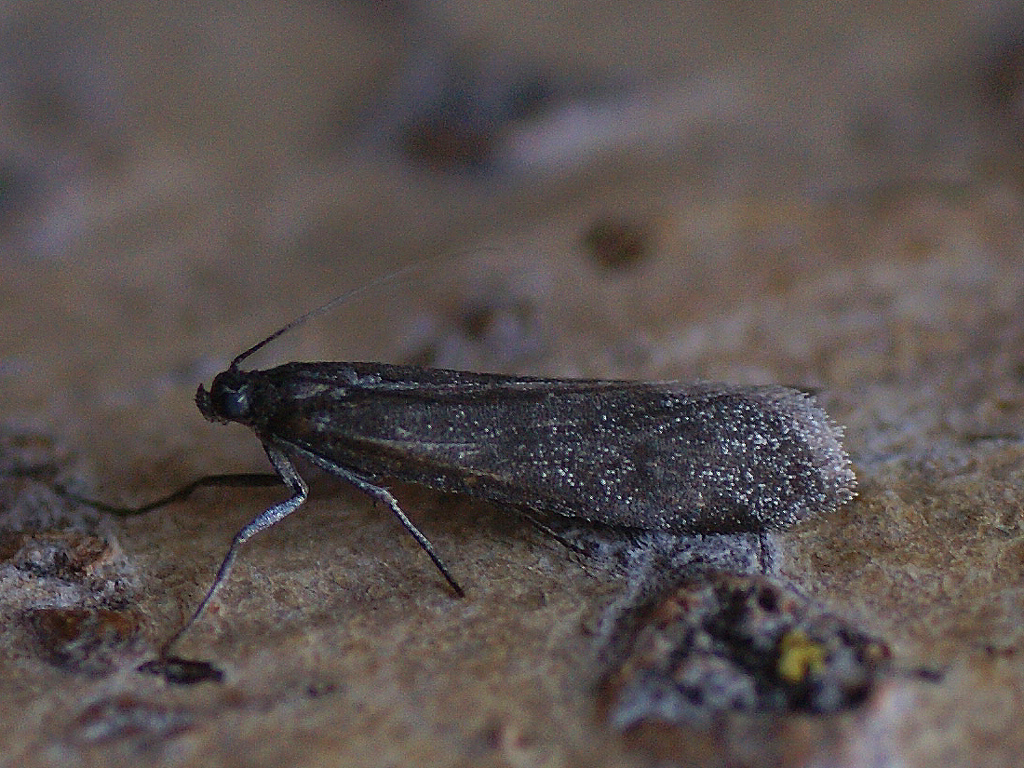

Scientific classification
- Domain: Eukaryota
- Kingdom: Animalia
- Phylum: Arthropoda
- Class: Insecta
- Order: Lepidoptera
- Family: Pyralidae
- Genus: Episcythrastis
- Species: E. tetricella

Binomial name
- Episcythrastis tetricella (Denis & Schiffermüller, 1775)

Synonyms
- Tinea tetricella Denis & Schiffermüller, 1775; Myelois tetricella var. amurensis Ragonot, 1887; Phycis plumbaginella Eversmann, 1844

= Episcythrastis tetricella =

Species of moth

Episcythrastis tetricella is a species of snout moth in the genus Episcythrastis. It was described by Michael Denis and Ignaz Schiffermüller in 1775. It is found in most of Europe, except the Benelux, Great Britain, Ireland, Portugal, Ukraine and Greece.

The wingspan is 26–32 mm. Adults are on wing from April to June in one generation per year.
