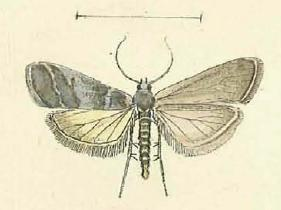

Scientific classification
- Domain: Eukaryota
- Kingdom: Animalia
- Phylum: Arthropoda
- Class: Insecta
- Order: Lepidoptera
- Family: Pyralidae
- Genus: Episcythrastis
- Species: E. tabidella

Binomial name
- Episcythrastis tabidella (Mann, 1864)

Synonyms
- Ephestia tabidella Mann, 1864; Myelois constanti Ragonot, 1893; Myelois heringi Hartig, 1939

= Episcythrastis tabidella =

Species of moth

Episcythrastis tabidella is a species of moth in the family Pyralidae. It is found in Spain, France, Albania, North Macedonia, Bulgaria and Turkey and on Sardinia and Corsica.
