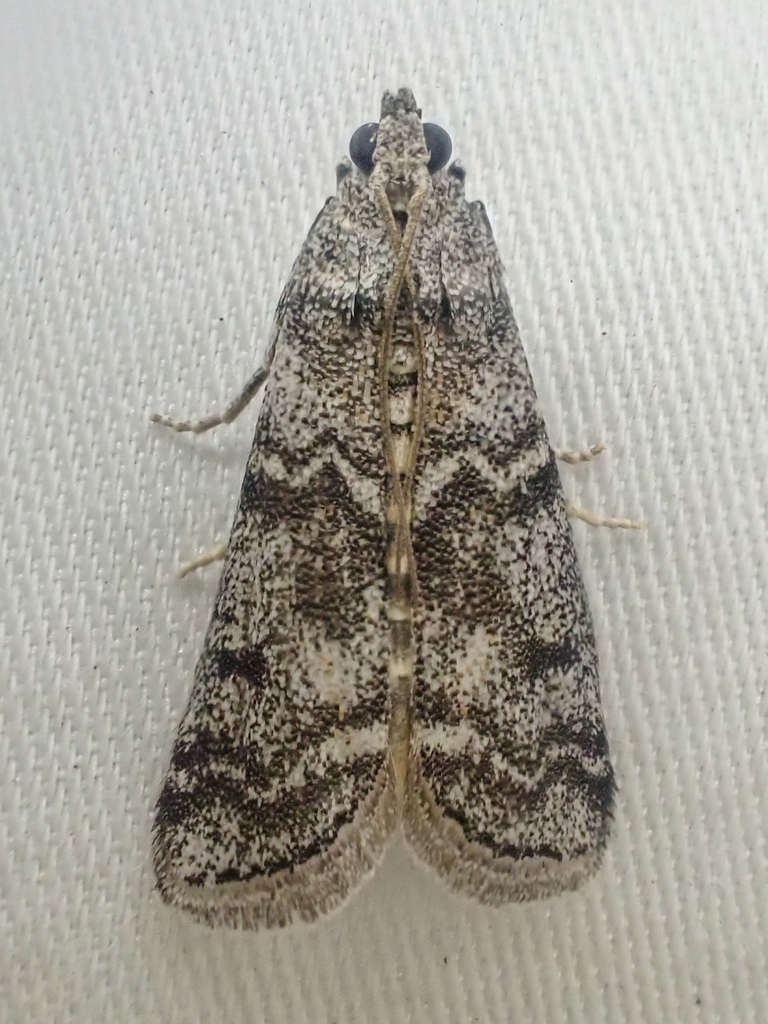

Scientific classification
- Kingdom: Animalia
- Phylum: Arthropoda
- Class: Insecta
- Order: Lepidoptera
- Family: Pyralidae
- Genus: Myelopsis
- Species: M. subtetricella

Binomial name
- Myelopsis subtetricella (Ragonot, 1889)

Synonyms
- Myelois subtetricella Ragonot, 1889; Episcythrastis subtetricella; Myelois zonulella Ragonot, 1889; Myelois obnupsella Hulst, 1890

= Myelopsis subtetricella =

Species of moth

Myelopsis subtetricella is a species of snout moth in the genus Myelopsis. It was described by Émile Louis Ragonot in 1889. It is found from Canada through the United States, as far south as southern California and Florida.

The wingspan is 19–22 mm.

The larvae feed on acorns.
