= Variations for Orchestra (Bassett) =

Variations for Orchestra is a single-movement composition for orchestra by the American composer Leslie Bassett. The piece was first performed in Rome in 1963 by the RAI National Symphony Orchestra under the conductor Ferruccio Scaglia. It was later given its United States premiere at the Philadelphia Academy of Music on October 22, 1965 by the Philadelphia Orchestra under Eugene Ormandy. The work was awarded the 1966 Pulitzer Prize for Music.
