= New York Entomological Society =

The New York Entomological Society, Inc.
- Formation: 1892; 134 years ago
- Merger of: Brooklyn Entomological Society
- Headquarters: American Museum of Natural History
- Website: www.nyentsoc.org

The New York Entomological Society was founded in 1892. The Brooklyn Entomological Society merged with the Society in 1968. The Society publishes Entomologica Americana which is the successor to the Journal of the New York Entomological Society.

A related society, the New York Entomological Club, briefly existed between 1880 and 1882. It published the first two volumes of Papilio, a journal entirely devoted to Lepidoptera, during the years 1881 and 1882. After the society's activities ceased, two more volumes of Papilio were published between 1883 and 1884, after which the journal ceased publication.

== See also ==
- Journals associated with the New York Entomological Society
