= George Duryea Hulst =

American clergyman and naturalist

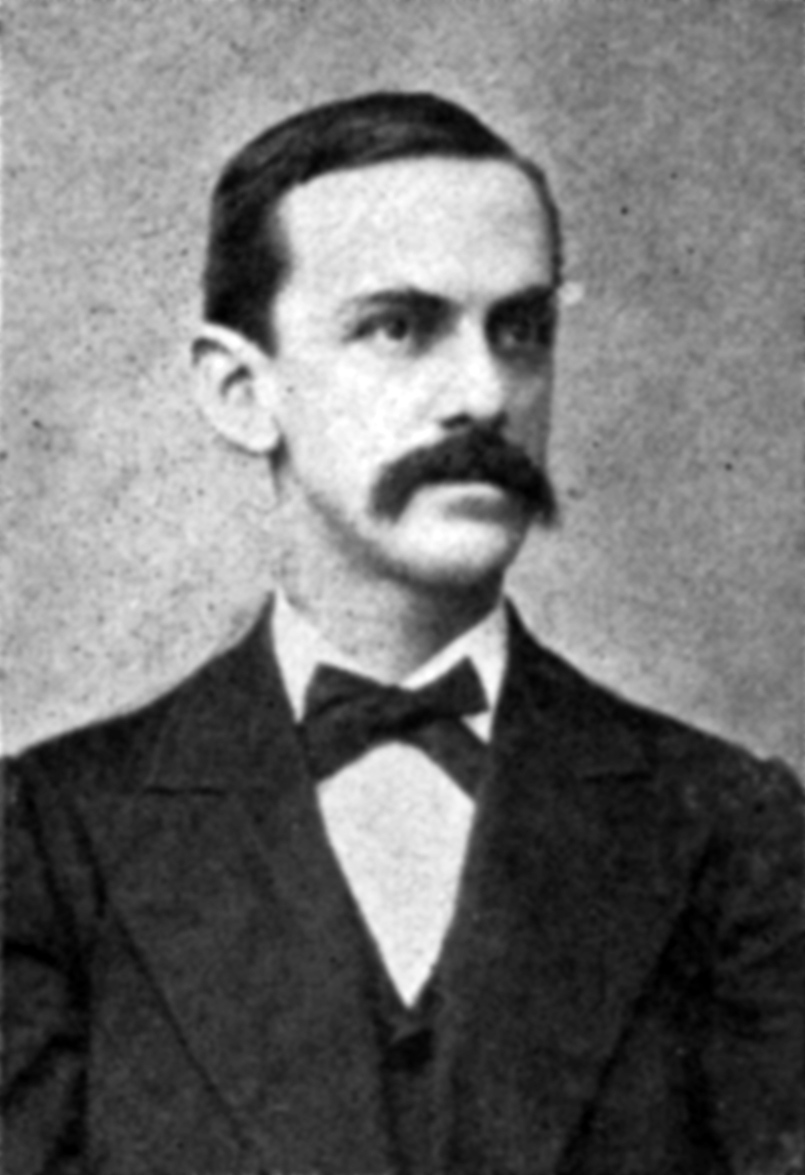
- Born: 9 March 1846; Brooklyn, New York, United States
- Died: 5 November 1900 (aged 54); Brooklyn, New York, United States
- Education: Rutgers University
- Scientific career
- Fields: Botany; Entomology

George Duryea Hulst (9 March 1846 – 5 November 1900) was an American clergyman, botanist, and entomologist.

== Biography ==
He graduated from Rutgers University in 1866 and received a degree from New Brunswick Theological Seminary in 1869, finally receiving his degree of Doctor of Philosophy from Rutgers in 1891.

He was the pastor at the South Bushwick Reformed Church in Brooklyn, New York, starting soon after his ordination in 1869, and continuing until his death in 1900. Although this was his main focus, he also managed to make substantial contributions to science during those same years.

He was an early member in the Brooklyn Entomological Society, and he was editor of its publication Entomologia Americana from 1887 to 1889.

In 1888, he took on the new position of entomologist at the Rutgers' New Jersey Agricultural Experiment station, founding the department of entomology there and teaching entomology courses at the university. He resigned after only a year when it became apparent that it took too much time away from his primary responsibility as pastor, but left a good foundation for his successor, John Bernhardt Smith, to build upon.

He died suddenly at his home in Brooklyn on November 5, 1900. Most of his entomological collection was given to Rutgers well before his death, with the core specimens that he kept for reference going to the Brooklyn Museum after his death. His plant specimens are now in the herbarium at the Brooklyn Botanical Garden.

== Publications ==
- George Duryea Hulst (1886). New Species and Varieties of Geometridae, Etc. New York Entomological Society.
- George Duryea Hulst (1888). Insect Pests and the Means for Destroying Them. New Jersey Agricultural College Experiment Station.
- George Duryea Hulst (1890). The Phycitidae of North America. American Entomological Society.
- George Duryea Hulst (1896). Classification of the Geometrina of North America. American Entomological Society.
